= List of shipwrecks in 2011 =

The list of shipwrecks in 2011 includes ships sunk, foundered, grounded, or otherwise lost during 2011.

table of contents
2011
Jan	Feb	Mar	Apr
May	Jun	Jul	Aug
Sep	Oct	Nov	Dec
Unknown date

== January ==
=== 1 January ===
List of shipwrecks: 1 January 2011
Ship	State	Description
Manik Mia 2	Bangladesh	The cargo ship collided with Abdullah (Bangladesh) at Chittagong and sank. Her twelve crew were rescued by Abdullah.

=== 3 January ===
List of shipwrecks: 3 January 2011
Ship	State	Description
Damariscotta	United States	The fishing vessel sank near Point Judith, Rhode Island.

=== 5 January ===
List of shipwrecks: 5 January 2011
Ship	State	Description
USS Kittiwake	United States Navy	The decommissioned Chanticleer-class submarine rescue vessel was scuttled in the Cayman Islands off Seven Mile Beach, Grand Cayman, as an artificial reef.
Sea Shine 14	Sierra Leone	The cargo ship caught fire in the Persian Gulf. Her fifteen crew were rescued by the Iranian Coast Guard.

=== 9 January ===
List of shipwrecks: 9 January 2011
Ship	State	Description
Seiyoh	Japan	The tanker capsized and sank in the Inland Sea of Japan with the loss of two of her five crew.

=== 11 January ===
List of shipwrecks: 11 January 2011
Ship	State	Description
Soon Bee II	Malaysia	The cargo ship foundered in the South China Sea off Kuala Rajang, Sarawak with the loss of eight of her eighteen crew.

=== 28 January ===
List of shipwrecks: 28 January 2011
Ship	State	Description
Prantalay 14	Thailand	Battle of Minicoy Island: The trawler, being used by pirates who had seized her as a mother ship, was shelled and sunk by INS Cankarso (Indian Navy). 10 pirates were killed and 15 captured.

=== 30 January ===
List of shipwrecks: 30 January 2011
Ship	State	Description
INS Vindhyagiri	Indian Navy	The Nilgiri-class frigate collided with the cargo ship Nordlake (Cyprus) in Jawaharlal Nehru Port, Mumbai, on 30 January. Vindhyagiri was towed into harbour where she sank on 31 January. Raised and decommissioned in 2012.

== February ==
=== 4 February ===
List of shipwrecks: 4 February 2011
Ship	State	Description
Nordland 1	Germany	The cargo ship was driven ashore on Borkum.

=== 7 February ===
List of shipwrecks: 7 February 2011
Ship	State	Description
Grigoriy Petrovskiy	Ukraine	The cargo ship sank in a storm after striking a pier in the Port of Poti, Georgia. Her crew of eleven were rescued.

=== 8 February ===
List of shipwrecks: 8 February 2011
Ship	State	Description
Terrigail	United States	The 58-foot (17.7 m) longline fishing vessel was wrecked in Alimuda Bay (53°26′N 167°21′W) on Unalaska Island in the Aleutian Islands. A United States Coast Guard helicopter rescued all five crew members.

=== 10 February ===
List of shipwrecks: 10 February 2011
Ship	State	Description
Midnight Sun	United States	The 68-foot (20.7 m) fishing vessel was wrecked at Cape Paramanof (58°18′20″N 153°03′30″W) on the west side of Afognak Island in the Kodiak Archipelago. A United States Coast Guard helicopter rescued her entire crew of five.

=== 12 February ===
List of shipwrecks: 12 February 2011
Ship	State	Description
Lady Rana	Panama	The cargo ship was driven ashore and severely damaged at Sharjah, United Arab Emirates. Her crew survived.

=== 15 February ===
List of shipwrecks: 15 February 2011
Ship	State	Description
Shirvan	Azerbaijan	The crane vessel was severely damaged by fire in Baku Bay with the loss of one life.

=== 17 February ===
List of shipwrecks: 17 February 2011
Ship	State	Description
Dream Voyage	Vietnam	The junk sank in Halong Bay with the loss of twelve lives. At least 15 people were rescued.

=== Unknown date ===
List of shipwrecks: Unknown date 2011
Ship	State	Description
Migrant ship	Unknown	The ship capsized off the Yemen coast with the loss of fifty-seven Somali refugees.

== March ==
=== 1 March ===
List of shipwrecks: 1 March 2011
Ship	State	Description
Nieuwpoort 28	Netherlands	The fishing trawler capsized off Dunkirk, France. Three lives were lost. She was recovered by parbuckling on 5 March.

=== 6 March ===
List of shipwrecks: 6 March 2011
Ship	State	Description
Capt’N Andrew	United States	The 58-foot (17.7 m) fishing vessel ran aground at Bold Cape (55°01′30″N 162°15′00″W) on the south coast of the Alaska Peninsula. The crew of the fishing vessel Just in Case (United States) borrowed a skiff from the harbormaster at King Cove, Alaska, and used it to rescue all five people aboard Capt’N Andrew.
Zhe Ling Yu Yun 135	China	The fishing vessel collided with the motor vessel Cosco Hong Kong (United Kingdom) 30 nautical miles (56 km; 35 mi) off the coast of China. She sank with the loss of all 11 crew.

=== 9 March ===
List of shipwrecks: 9 March 2011
Ship	State	Description
Rak Afrikana	Saint Vincent and the Grenadines	The cargo ship foundered off the coast of Somalia. Her 25 crew were rescued by Zeffiro (Italian Navy).

=== 11 March ===
An unknown number of vessels are washed ashore or sunk around the Pacific Rim following an earthquake and tsunami off the north east coast of Japan. Ship casualties include:-

List of shipwrecks: 11 March 2011
Ship	State	Description
Akane Maru No. 1	Japan	The 400-ton salmon and saury fishing vessel was driven 100 metres (330 ft) ashore by a tsunami at Kesennuma, Miyagi. The vessel was transported to the water on a cradle and refloated with a crane on 17 June 2011.
Anyo Maru No. 6	Japan	The 235-ton fishing vessel was driven ashore by a tsunami at Kesennuma, Miyagi.
Asia Symphony	Panama	The 6,175-ton cargo ship was driven ashore by a tsunami at Kamaishi, Iwate.
Chikyu	Japan	The research vessel was damaged by a tsunami off Hachinohe, Aomori.
Chinasteel Integrity	Panama	The cargo ship ran aground off Kashima, Ibarki after being hit by a tsunami.
Chokai Maru	Japan	The 150-foot (46 m) fishing vessel was driven ashore by a tsunami at Higashimatsushima.
Choyo Maru No. 5	Japan	Choyo Maru No. 5 (left) The fishing vessel was driven ashore at Kesennuma.
C. S. Victory	Malta	The port of Ishinomaki, Miyagi after the tsunami. C. S. Victory beached (centre). The 32,385-ton cargo ship was driven aground by a tsunami at Ishinomaki, Miyagi.
El Cholo	Peru	2011 Tōhoku earthquake and tsunami: The fishing vessel disappeared after leaving Puerto Rico de Bayóvar, Peru and was presumed to have foundered in the Pacific Ocean with the loss of all ten crew.
Emu Arrow	Bahamas	The cargo ship was damaged at Kashima, Ibaraki when a tsunami caused her to collide with other vessels.
Genei Maru No. 88	Japan	The fishing vessel was driven ashore by a tsunami at Hachinohe.
Glovis Mercury	South Korea	Glovis Mercury The 6,901-ton cargo ship was driven ashore at Sendai. Refloated and returned to service.
Hamayuri	Japan	The sight seeing boat was driven ashore on the roof of an inn by a tsunami at Ōtsuchi, Iwate Prefecture. The wreck was removed and broken up two months later.
Kameyama	Japan	The 148-ton ferry was driven 500 metres (1,600 ft) ashore on Ōshima Island by a tsunami.
Kazu Maru No. 1	Japan	The tug was driven ashore by a tsunami at Ōfunato, Iwate.
Khrizolitovyy	Russia	The 523-ton refrigerated fish carrier was pushed ashore and damaged by a tsunami at Ōfunato. Her thirteen crew were rescued by a fishing vessel.
Kiku Maru No. 38	Japan	Kiku Maru No. 38 The fishing vessel was driven ashore by a tsunami at Hachinohe.
Kinei Maru No. 31	Japan	The 221-ton fishing vessel was wrecked by a tsunami at Kesennuma. Her eight crew survived.
Koshin Maru	Japan	The 5,192-ton cargo ship which was either driven ashore or sunk by a tsunami.
Kyotoku Maru No. 18	Japan	The 60-metre (200 ft) fishing vessel was driven 500 metres (1,600 ft) (or 500 yards, 460 m) ashore by a tsunami at Kesennuma. The vessel was later scrapped, beginning September 2013.
Kyotoku Maru No. 81	Japan	The 80-ton, 29.39-metre (96.4 ft) fishing vessel was driven ashore by a tsunami at Onahama.
Lion's Whelp	United States	2011 Tōhoku earthquake and tsunami: The 90-foot (27 m) wooden schooner was destroyed at dock by the tsunami at Brookings, Oregon.
Myojin Maru No. 3	Japan	The 48.8-metre (160 ft), 330-ton fishing vessel was driven ashore by a tsunami at Kesennuma.
Shiramizu	Japan	The bulk carrier was severely damaged by a tsunami at Shinchi, Fukushima.
Shirouma	Panama	The 77,739-ton cargo ship was driven ashore by a tsunami at Haramichi.
Sho Yo	Japan	The vessel was driven ashore by a tsunami at Higashimatsushima.
Sider Joy	Unflagged	The cargo ship was under construction and about to start sea trials. The vessel was driven ashore and damaged by a tsunami at Sendai. Refloated, completed and put in service.
Suwa Maru No.82	Japan	The 582-ton 49.9-metre (164 ft) fishing vessel was driven ashore by a tsunami at Onahama.
Taiki Maru No. 71	Japan	The fishing vessel was driven ashore at Kesennuma. Her eight crew survived.
Toripan	Unflagged	The cargo ship was under construction. The vessel was driven ashore and damaged by a tsunami at Ishinomaki.
Unknown and unknown	unknown	2011 Tōhoku earthquake and tsunami: A tug and barge were pushed ashore off Kudat, Malaysia. The tug was able to pull off at high tide.

=== 16 March ===
List of shipwrecks: 16 March 2011
Ship	State	Description
Oliva	Malta	The cargo ship ran aground near Nightingale Island, Tristan da Cunha, spilling her fuel and cargo of soya beans. The ship broke up the following day. Her 22 crew were rescued by Edinburgh (Tristan da Cunha) and Prince Albert II (Bahamas). Oliva broke in two on 18 March.

=== 20 March ===
List of shipwrecks: 20 March 2011
Ship	State	Description
Min Ningde Cargo 0202	China	The cargo ship capsized and sank in the South China Sea off Ningde with the loss of four of her six crew.

=== 26 March ===
List of shipwrecks: 26 March 2011
Ship	State	Description
Helga	Panama	The cargo ship sank off the coast of Belize with the loss of three of her crew.

=== 28 March ===
List of shipwrecks: 28 March 2011
Ship	State	Description
Unknown patrol boat	Libya Coast Guard	The Vittoria PV-30LS-class patrol boat was damaged off Misrata by a United States Navy Lockheed P-3 Orion aircraft with Maverick missiles and beached.
Unknown patrol boats	Libyan Navy	Two fast patrol boats were attacked by Fairchild Republic A-10 Thunderbolt II aircraft off Misrata. One was sunk and one abandoned.

=== 29 March ===
List of shipwrecks: 29 March 2011
Ship	State	Description
Alpspray	Germany	The tanker exploded, caught fire and sank in the Dortmund-Ems Canal at Lingen. Her five crew were rescued.

== April ==
=== 5 April ===
List of shipwrecks: 5 April 2011
Ship	State	Description
Zapadnyy	Belize	The food tanker was forced off course by another ship and collided with a floating dock belonging to the Fr. Lürssen shipyard, causing heavy damage and sprung a leak causing her to be beached to prevent sinking in the River Weser at Bremen-Vegesack. Refloated, repaired, returned to service.

=== 6 April ===
List of shipwrecks: 6 April 2011
Ship	State	Description
Binh Minh 28	Vietnam	The cargo ship was in collision with Phuc Hai 05 (Vietnam) and foundered off Da Nang with the loss of five of her crew.
Unnamed boat	Libya	The boat sank 59 kilometres (32 nmi) south of Lampedusa, Italy, killing asylum seekers from Libya. At least 20 were killed and 130 reported missing; 48 survivors were rescued by the Corpo delle Capitanerie di porto - Guardia costiera.

=== 7 April ===
List of shipwrecks: 7 April 2011
Ship	State	Description
Hyang Ro Bong	North Korea	The cargo ship collided with Banga Lanka (Bangladesh) and sank at Chittagong, Bangladesh. Her 31 crew were rescued.

=== 9 April ===
List of shipwrecks: 9 April 2011
Ship	State	Description
Richardson's Bay	United States	The tug capsized and sank in the Pacific Ocean off Ocean Beach, California with the loss of one of her two crew.

=== 13 April ===
List of shipwrecks: 13 April 2011
Ship	State	Description
HMAS Adelaide	Royal Australian Navy	HMAS Adelaide sinking. The decommissioned Adelaide-class guided-missile frigate was sunk with explosive charges in the Tasman Sea 0.9 nautical miles (1.0 mi; 1.7 km) off of Avoca Beach, New South Wales, Australia, to create a recreational dive site.

=== 25 April ===
List of shipwrecks: 25 April 2011
Ship	State	Description
Unnamed ferry	Democratic Republic of the Congo	The ferry capsized and sank in Lake Kivu, near Minova. At least 38 people reported killed.

=== 29 April ===
List of shipwrecks: 25 April 2011
Ship	State	Description
RHIB motorboat	Libya	2011 Libyan Civil War: On April 29, 2011, off the coast of Misrata, Libya, the French frigate Courbet ( (France) French Navy) engaged four loyalist Rigid-Hulled Inflatable Boats (RHIBs) laying naval mines, resulting in the sinking of one RHIB.

== May ==
=== 2 May ===
List of shipwrecks: 2 May 2011
Ship	State	Description
Ary Perreiras	Brazilian Navy	The decommissioned troopship foundered in the Ionian Sea whilst under tow to a Turkish scrapyard.

=== 15 May ===
List of shipwrecks: 15 May 2011
Ship	State	Description
V. B. Antárctico	Panama	The tug capsized and sank in the Atlantic Ocean off the coast of Portugal. Her eleven crew were rescued by Arctic Voyager (Bahamas) and Elizabeth (flag unknown).

=== 18 May ===
List of shipwrecks: 18 May 2011
Ship	State	Description
Sandy Point	United States	The fishing vessel sank after colliding with the container ship Eurus London in the Gulfport Ship Channel. She was recovered by parbuckling in July 2011.

=== 19–20 May ===
List of shipwrecks: 19–20 May 2011
Ship	State	Description
Ain Zaara	Libyan Navy	2011 Libyan civil war: The Project 1234E corvette was sunk at Tripoli, Libya by British aircraft.
Al Ghardabia	Libyan Navy	2011 Libyan civil war: The Project 1159 frigate, in reserve since 2001, was sunk at her dock in Tripoli, Libya by British aircraft.
Beir Algandula, Beir Alkuesat, Beir Alkur, Beir Gtifa, Beir Gzir, and Beir Ktitat	Libyan Navy	2011 Libyan civil war: These six Beir Grassa-class missile boats were damaged at Tripoli, Libya by British aircraft and abandoned.
Jelyana	Libyan Navy	2011 Libyan civil war: The Al Mergheb-class patrol boat was damaged by British aircraft, caught fire and capsized. Later raised, repaired and returned to service.
Sabratha	Libyan Navy	2011 Libyan civil war: The Zuwarah-class patrol boat was sunk by British aircraft.
Talgrift	Libyan Navy	2011 Libyan civil war: The Al Mergheb-class patrol boat was sunk by British aircraft at Dera'a.

=== 23 May ===
List of shipwrecks: 23 May 2011
Ship	State	Description
Volgoneft 263	Russia	The tanker was under repair in a floating dry dock when the dry dock sank. As holes had been cut in her hull, Volgoneft 263 also sank.

=== 27 May ===
List of shipwrecks: 27 May 2011
Ship	State	Description
JLL Victorita	Philippines	Typhoon Songda: The coaster was driven ashore at Basco, Batanes. Her eighteen crew were rescued.

== June ==
=== 3 June ===
List of shipwrecks: 3 June 2011
Ship	State	Description
En Avant 5	Netherlands	The tug capsized in the Maas at Dordrecht, South Holland. Her four crew survived.

=== 4 June ===
List of shipwrecks: 4 June 2011
Ship	State	Description
Wendameen	United States	The schooner ran aground at Portland, Maine. All 27 people on board were rescued. Wendameen was later refloated.

=== 5 June ===
List of shipwrecks: 5 June 2011
Ship	State	Description
OT Moon	Bangladesh	The tanker capsized and sank at Chittagong.

=== 11 June ===
List of shipwrecks: 11 June 2011
Ship	State	Description
Adonis	Australia	The tug capsized and sank at Gladstone, Queensland with the loss of one of her four crew.

=== 14 June ===
List of shipwrecks: 14 June 2011
Ship	State	Description
Deneb	Antigua and Barbuda	The container ship capsized at Algeciras, Spain.

=== 22 June ===
List of shipwrecks: 22 June 2011
Ship	State	Description
Vialis	Netherlands	The tanker broke in two in the Caland Canal.

=== 26 June ===
List of shipwrecks: 26 June 2011
Ship	State	Description
Aries	United States	The tug foundered in the Bering Sea east of Saint Paul Island, Alaska. Her four crew were rescued by a United States Coast Guard helicopter.

== July ==
=== 3 July ===
List of shipwrecks: 3 July 2011
Ship	State	Description
Erik	Mexico	The 115-foot (35 m) fishing boat. carrying tourists, sank after encountering bad weather in the Gulf of California some 60 nautical miles (110 km; 69 mi) from San Felipe, Baja California, Mexico. As of 4 July 2011, one fatality was reported and between five and eight passengers were missing. As of 20 July 2011, seven people were missing and one was confirmed dead.

=== 5 July ===
List of shipwrecks: 5 July 2011
Ship	State	Description
Musthika Kencana II	Indonesia	The ferry, which had caught fire the day before, foundered off Java.

=== 10 July ===
List of shipwrecks: 10 July 2011
Ship	State	Description
Bulgaria	Russia	The passenger ship sank in the Volga River with 208 people on board. One hundred and twenty-two were killed.

=== 23 July ===
List of shipwrecks: 23 July 2011
Ship	State	Description
Union Neptune	Cook Islands	The cargo ship foundered off the Île d'Oléron, Charente-Maritime, France. Her six crew were rescued by Abeille Languedoc (France).

=== 25 July ===
List of shipwrecks: 25 July 2011
Ship	State	Description
Ishan Alyanak	Turkey	The ferry collided with the pier at İzmir and sank.

=== 29 July ===
List of shipwrecks: 29 July 2011
Ship	State	Description
Phoenix	Equatorial Guinea	The tanker ran aground near Durban, South Africa. Her fifteen crew were rescued. She was refloated on 2 September and scuttled on 6 September 43 nautical miles (80 km) off Durban.

=== 30 July ===
List of shipwrecks: 30 July 2011
Ship	State	Description
Wendameen	United States	The schooner ran aground off Green Diamond Island, Maine. All 49 passengers were transferred to other vessels.

=== 31 July ===
List of shipwrecks: 31 July 2011
Ship	State	Description
Asia Malaysia	Philippines	The ferry capsized and sank off Calabasa Island. All 168 people on board were rescued.
Pavit	Panama	The tanker was driven ashore crewless at Juhu, India. Crew rescued by HMS St Albans (Royal Navy) on or before 1 July (One report states January).

== August ==
=== 3 August ===
List of shipwrecks: 3 August 2011
Ship	State	Description
Karin Schepers	Antigua and Barbuda	The cargo ship ran aground off the Trevean Cliff, Morvah Cornwall, United Kingdom. She refloated herself and continued her voyage from Cork, Ireland to Rotterdam.

=== 4 August ===
List of shipwrecks: 4 August 2011
Ship	State	Description
Rak Carrier	Panama	The 225-metre (738 ft) vessel, carrying 60,000 tons of coal bound for Gurajat, India, sank off the Mumbai coast. The crew of 30 was rescued by the Indian Coast Guard and Indian Navy, but the authorities are concerned about possible environmental damage.

=== 8 August ===
List of shipwrecks: 8 August 2011
Ship	State	Description
Angel 1	Panama	The cargo ship ran aground on a reef off Poudres-d'Or, Mauritius. After more than three months on the reef, she was refloated and taken under tow but found to be severely holed. The ship sank on 26 November.

=== 9 August ===
List of shipwrecks: 9 August 2011
Ship	State	Description
Bulk Carrier I	Philippines	The bulk carrier was in collision with HS Puccini (Liberia) in the Celebes Sea and foundered. Her 21 crew were rescued, but two crew from HS Puccini were killed.

=== 10 August ===
List of shipwrecks: 10 August 2011
Ship	State	Description
USS Arthur W. Radford	United States Navy	The Spruance-class destroyer was scuttled as an artificial reef in the Atlantic Ocean off the coast of Delaware in 130 feet (40 m) of water at 38°30.850′N 074°30.656′W.

=== 12 August ===
List of shipwrecks: 12 August 2011
Ship	State	Description
Chiefton	United Kingdom	The Girl-class tugboat was overrun by the crane barge Skyline Barge 19 (Netherlands), which she was towing. She capsized and sank in the River Thames at Convoys Wharf, Deptford with the loss of one of her three crew. Chiefton was refloated on 18 August. She was subsequently declared a constructive total loss and scrapped at Chatham, Kent.

=== 17 August ===
List of shipwrecks: 17 August 2011
Ship	State	Description
Mungo	Bahamas	The coaster ran aground at Littlehampton Harbour, West Sussex, United Kingdom, following failure of her steering gear. Refloated the next day.

=== 19 August ===
List of shipwrecks: 19 August 2011
Ship	State	Description
Unknown Libyan tugboat	Libya	2011 Libyan civil war: Second Battle of Zawiya: The tugboat was sunk off Zawiya, Libya by British aircraft.

=== 27 August ===
List of shipwrecks: 27 August 2011
Ship	State	Description
Unidentified transport	Libya	2011 Libyan civil war: The rebel transport blew up in the harbor at Zuwara, Libya, at the time the harbor was being shelled by Libyan government field artillery.

=== 30 August ===
List of shipwrecks: 30 August 2011
Ship	State	Description
Bear	United States	The 52-foot (15.8 m) halibut-fishing vessel ran aground and was lost in Aniakchak Bay (56°42′N 157°22′W) on the south coast of the Alaska Peninsula in Alaska. Wearing survival suits, her crew of three abandoned ship in a life raft and was rescued by a United States Coast Guard Sikorsky MH-60 Jayhawk helicopter.

== September ==
=== 1 September ===
List of shipwrecks: 1 September 2011
Ship	State	Description
Ai Qi Shun	Cambodia	The cargo ship ran aground off Petropavlovsk-Kamchatsky, Russia and was abandoned by her crew.

=== 6 September ===
List of shipwrecks: 6 September 2011
Ship	State	Description
Hyundai Seolbong	South Korea	The ferry caught fire in the South China Sea. All 128 people on board were rescued by the South Korean Coast Guard and South Korean Navy.

=== 10 September ===
List of shipwrecks: 10 September 2011
Ship	State	Description
RiverZZ	Netherlands	The passenger ship was destroyed by fire at Rotterdam, South Holland.
Spice Islander I	Tanzania	Zanzibar ferry sinking: The ferry sank between Zanzibar and Pemba Island with over 3,500 people on board, of whom about 260 were rescued. 240 people were confirmed to have been killed, 2,900 in total were reported missing or dead.

=== 15 September ===
List of shipwrecks: 15 September 2011
Ship	State	Description
Nordlys	Norway	The cruise ship suffered a fire in her engine room which killed two of her 55 crew. All 207 passengers and some of the surviving crew were rescued, with the remainder engaged in firefighting operations.

=== 20 September ===
List of shipwrecks: 20 September 2011
Ship	State	Description
Canadian Miner	Canada	The lake freighter ran aground on Scatarie Island, Nova Scotia after losing the tow from Hellas (Greece) in a storm whilst being towed to Turkey for scrapping.
Kita Maru No. 12	Japan	The tug capsized and sank at Wajima whilst assisting Miura ( (Japan) Japanese Coast Guard). Both crew were killed.

=== 26 September ===
List of shipwrecks: 26 September 2011
Ship	State	Description
KM Marina Nusantara	Indonesia	The ferry collided with a tug and barge in the Barito River, Borneo and then caught fire. Four of the 443 people on board were killed.

=== 28 September ===
List of shipwrecks: 28 September 2011
Ship	State	Description
KM Kirana IX	Indonesia	A lorry on board the ferry caught fire whilst she was docked at Surabaya, causing a stampede amongst the passengers. Eight people were killed.

=== 29 September ===
List of shipwrecks: 29 September 2011
Ship	State	Description
Fang Zhou 6	China	Typhoon Nesat: The cargo ship was abandoned off Zhuhai. Her twelve crew were rescued by helicopter.

== October ==
=== 3 October ===
List of shipwrecks: 3 October 2011
Ship	State	Description
Jui Hsing	China	Typhoon Nalgae: The cargo ship was driven ashore off Keelung, Taiwan and broke in two with the loss of ten of her 21 crew.
Porsøy	Saint Vincent and the Grenadines	The cargo ship struck an islet in the strait Raftsundet in Norway. Porsøy was found to be damaged beyond repair and scrapping of the vessel began in Grenå, Denmark on 13 October 2011.

=== 5 October ===
List of shipwrecks: 5 October 2011
Ship	State	Description
Rena	Liberia	MV Rena The 235-metre (771 ft) container ship ran aground on the Astrolabe Reef in the Bay of Plenty, North Island, New Zealand (37°32′25″S 176°25′45″E). The ship broke in two in a storm on 8 January 2012, with the stern section reported to have sunk on 10 January 2012

=== 6 October ===
List of shipwrecks: 6 October 2011
Ship	State	Description
Jager	United States	The 42-foot (12.8 m) crab-fishing vessel sank in the Chatham Strait in the Alexander Archipelago in Southeast Alaska west of Angoon, Alaska. A United States Coast Guard helicopter rescued the only person aboard from a life raft.

=== 7 October ===
List of shipwrecks: 7 October 2011
Ship	State	Description
Finnøyglimt	Norway	The cargo ship foundered off Haugesund with the loss of one of her three crew.

=== 13 October ===
List of shipwrecks: 13 October 2011
Ship	State	Description
Grigoriy Bugrov	Russia	The tanker struck a submerged object and foundered in the Caspian Sea off Chechen Island. Her fourteen crew were rescued.

=== 14 October ===
List of shipwrecks: 14 October 2011
Ship	State	Description
Justin	United States	The LCM-8 landing craft foundered off Alki Point, Seattle, Washington. She was raised the next day.

=== 18 October ===
List of shipwrecks: 18 October 2011
Ship	State	Description
Bilgili Biraderler	Turkey	The cargo ship was driven ashore at Istanbul.
Enko	Turkey	The cargo ship was driven ashore at Istanbul.
Ismet Atasoy	Turkey	The cargo ship was driven ashore at Istanbul.
Kumdas 2	Turkey	The cargo ship was driven ashore at Istanbul.
Pearl	Malta	The cargo ship was driven ashore at Istanbul.

=== 20 October ===
List of shipwrecks: 20 October 2011
Ship	State	Description
Reina 1	Malta	The cargo ship was in collision with Ankara (Turkey) in the Adriatic Sea off the coast of Albania with the loss of eight of her ten crew.

=== 28 October ===
List of shipwrecks: 28 October 2011
Ship	State	Description
Oriental Sunrise	Panama	The cargo ship was in collision with Hamburg Bridge (Panama) off Qingdao, China and sank with the loss of eleven of her nineteen crew.

=== 31 October ===
List of shipwrecks: 31 October 2011
Ship	State	Description
Golub	Croatia	The fishing vessel was in collision with Joerg N. (Malta) off Pula, Croatia and sank. None of the eight crew members was injured and all were rescued with their own work/rescue boats.

== November ==
=== 3 November ===
List of shipwrecks: 3 November 2011
Ship	State	Description
Pella	Jordan	The ro-ro ferry caught fire and sank in the Red Sea off Aqaba with the loss of one of the 1,229 passengers on board.

=== 5 November ===
List of shipwrecks: 5 November 2011
Ship	State	Description
Shiv Sagar	India	The cargo ship capsized and sank in the Gulf of Aden off Dhofar, Oman with the loss of nine of her fifteen crew.

=== 9 November ===
List of shipwrecks: 9 November 2011
Ship	State	Description
Legacy	Bahamas	The ferry was driven on to the Cherokee Reef, off the Abaco Islands. All eighteen people on board were rescued by the Bahamas Air Sea Rescue Association, the Royal Bahamas Defence Force and the United States Navy.

=== 17 November ===
List of shipwrecks: 17 November 2011
Ship	State	Description
Oriental Angel	South Korea	The combined trawler and factory ship caught fire in the Bering Sea off Beringovkiy, Russia with the loss of one of her 89 crew. Survivors were rescued by fishing vessels.

=== 21 November ===
List of shipwrecks: 21 November 2011
Ship	State	Description
Bright Ruby	South Korea	The cargo ship foundered in the South China Sea 300 nautical miles (560 km) south of Hong Kong with the loss of six of her 21 crew.
Helle Saj	Denmark	The dredger collided with Tonne (Denmark) at Thorsminde and sank. The wreck was removed in April 2012.

=== 27 November ===
List of shipwrecks: 27 November 2011
Ship	State	Description
Swanland	Cook Islands	The cargo ship foundered in the Irish Sea. Two of her eight crew were rescued and one was found dead, with five reported missing as of 28 November 2011.

== December ==
=== 5 December ===
List of shipwrecks: 5 December 2011
Ship	State	Description
SuperFerry 1	Philippines	The ferry ran aground off Taytaytan Island.

=== 7 December ===
List of shipwrecks: 7 December 2011
Ship	State	Description
Edro III	Sierra Leone	Edro III The cargo ship was driven ashore and wrecked at Peyia, Cyprus. Her crew were rescued.

=== 8 December ===
List of shipwrecks: 8 December 2011
Ship	State	Description
Dayspring	United Kingdom	The decommissioned fishing vessel was driven ashore in a storm near the village of Corpach, Fort William, Scotland.

=== 9 December ===
List of shipwrecks: 9 December 2011
Ship	State	Description
Florece	Dominican Republic	The cargo ship collided in the Bay of Biscay with Afrodite (Bahamas) and sank. All seven crew were rescued.

=== 10 December ===
List of shipwrecks: 10 December 2011
Ship	State	Description
Ryu-Jun	Cambodia	The cargo ship foundered in the South China Sea of Taitung, Taiwan with the loss of one of her eight crew.

=== 11 December ===
List of shipwrecks: 11 December 2011
Ship	State	Description
Changda 216	Belize	The cargo ship foundered off Luzon, Philippines when her cargo shifted. Two of her fifteen crew were lost.

=== 16 December ===
List of shipwrecks: 16 December 2011
Ship	State	Description
Magul	Portugal	The pilot boat, a former Tree-class trawler, was driven ashore and wrecked near Belz, Morbihan, France (47°38′N 3°12′W).
TK Bremen	Malta	TK Bremen The cargo ship was driven ashore at Erdeven, Morbihan, France. She was later scrapped in situ.

=== 17 December ===
List of shipwrecks: 17 December 2011
Ship	State	Description
Ever Transport III	Philippines	Tropical Storm Washi: The cargo liner ran aground and sank off Dumaguete. All 32 passengers and crew were rescued.

=== 18 December ===
List of shipwrecks: 18 December 2011
Ship	State	Description
Huong Dien 09	Vietnam	The collier capsizsed and sank off Co To Island with the loss of all nine of her crew.
Kolskaya	Russia	The oil platform capsized and sank in the Sea of Okhotsk with the loss of 53 of her 67 crew.

=== 20 December ===
List of shipwrecks: 20 December 2011
Ship	State	Description
Heather Anne	United Kingdom	The fishing vessel sank in Gerrans Bay, Cornwall with the loss of one of the two crew.

=== 25 December ===
List of shipwrecks: 25 December 2011
Ship	State	Description
Kijang III	Indonesia	The tug sank at Bukit Panglong, Bintan Island with the loss of two of her five crew.
Vinalines Queen	Vietnam	The bulk carrier carrying nickel ore sank near Luzon, Philippines with the loss of 22 of her 23 crew.

=== 27 December ===
List of shipwrecks: 27 December 2011
Ship	State	Description
Dogu Haslaman	Turkey	The cargo ship sank in the Aegean Sea 25 nautical miles (46 km) off Çeşme with the loss of two of her thirteen crew. Survivors were rescued by Pirireis (Turkey).

=== 31 December ===
List of shipwrecks: 31 December 2011
Ship	State	Description
The Pirate's Ransom	United States	The passenger ship ran aground off Clearwater, Florida. All passengers were taken off.

== Unknown date ==
List of shipwrecks: Unknown date 2011
Ship	State	Description
Bien Nam	Vietnam	The cargo ship was reported missing on 12 May whilst on a voyage from Tuticorin, India to Padang, Indonesia.
