= MT Phoenix (1974) =

History

Equatorial Guinea
- Name: Fujitsuki Maru (1974-1983); Giray (1983-1998); Evrenye 1 (1998-2004); Concel Pride (2004- 2008); Concep (2008-2011); Phoenix (2011)
- Builder: Shin Kurushima Dockyard Co., Ltd., Hiroshima, Japan
- Launched: 1974
- Identification: IMO number: 7371123
- Fate: Ran aground on 26 July 2011; Refloated and scuttled, 6 September 2011

General characteristics
- Type: Oil tanker
- Tonnage: 8,124 GT; 14,506 DWT
- Length: 164 m (538 ft)

MT Phoenix was a tanker which went aground in heavy seas at Sheffield Beach just north of Ballito near Durban, South Africa on the morning of 26 July 2011. The vessel was on its way to India to be scrapped when it ran aground. After three attempts, it was refloated, towed and then scuttled and sunk in 2,000 metres (6,600 ft) of water, about 80 kilometres (43 nmi) offshore of Amanzimtoti, south of Durban. The vessel was reportedly owned by either Suhair Khan of Dubai or Marika Investments, Lagos, Nigeria.

== Ship history ==
After her grounding, the 8,000 ton 164 metre ship was identified as the former Fujitsuki Maru (IMO number: 7371123) built at the Shin Kurushima Dockyard in Hiroshima, Japan, in 1974. She was renamed several times; to Giray in 1983, Evrenye 1 (1998), Concel Pride (2004), Concep (2008), and finally to Phoenix in mid-2011.

=== Grounding ===
The vessel, under the flag of Equatorial Guinea and with an Indian crew, was under way to Alang, India, to be scrapped, when it suffered engine failure and almost drifted ashore near the Eastern Cape town of Hamburg. The salvage tug Smit Amandla had been despatched to tow it to Durban. The South African Maritime Safety Authority (SAMSA) contacted the owners who initially undertook to charter a tug to replace the Smit Amandla and complete the voyage to India. When communications broke down, SAMSA applied for a court order for the detention, seizure and sale of the uninsured vessel. The court order was granted on 22 July, but its complete execution was delayed by further red tape when South Africa's chief harbour master, Rufus Lekala, refused to allow the tanker to berth in Durban. During this delay the weather deteriorated considerably in the area where the Phoenix lay at anchor, in compliance with the order.

On the evening of 25 July the vessel started dragging her anchor and drifting to shore. The salvage tug Smit Amandla, which was still in the area, attempted to reconnect the tow, but the effort was abandoned because of high seas, with waves of 4–6 metres and winds gusting to 30 knots. The following morning the vessel grounded some 200 metres from shore, just off a tourist beach. The National Sea Rescue Institute arranged for the despatch of a helicopter from South African Police Airwing based in Durban together with the South African Airforce from 17 Squadron based in Pretoria but on task in Durban and the Indian skeleton crew of 15 were airlifted to safety. Attempts by the Smit Amandla to refloat the vessel in early August failed, so a second tug, the Smit Siyanda, was despatched to the scene. Some 400 cubic metres of diesel fuel on board was pumped to containers on shore. Finally, in early September, the ship was successfully refloated, towed to sea, and then scuttled at position 30°12.0′S 31°25.2′E on 6 September 2011.

Since the Phoenix was not carrying Protection and indemnity insurance, an inquiry was launched by SAMSA to discover whether the operators of the ship, Noha Marine Services of India, had sufficient assets to cover the costs of the salvage operation. They discovered that A&K Shipping, a company registered in Belize, were the actual owners, but that both companies could only be traced to accommodation addresses. SAMSA eventually gave up their attempt to pursue payment, and the costs, R39 million, were borne by South Africa.
