= Parbuckle salvage =

Righting of a sunken vessel using rotational leverage

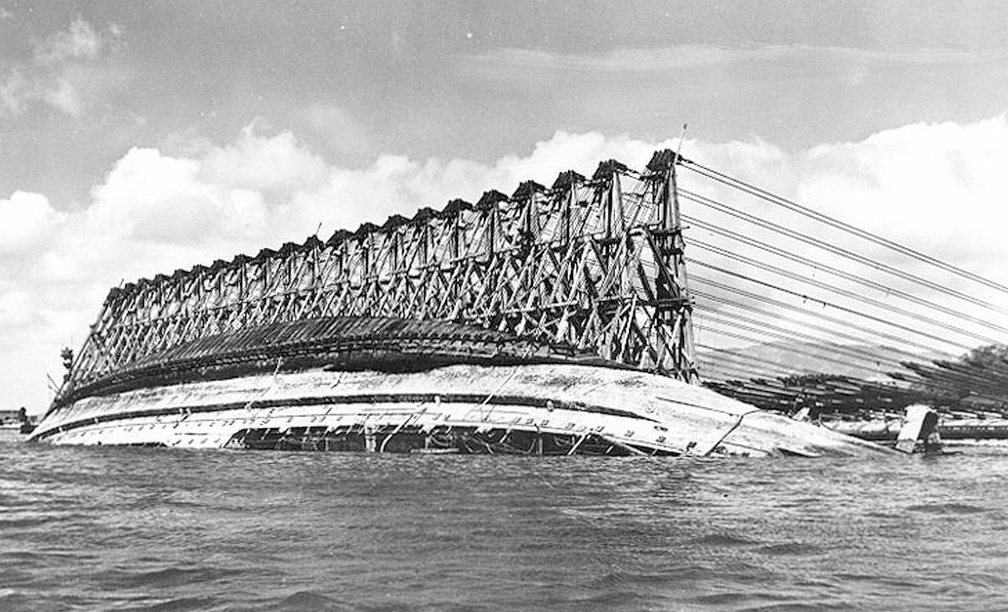
The capsized battleship USS Oklahoma is rotated upright while under salvage at Pearl Harbor, Hawaii, 8 March 1943. The ship is in the 130-degree position, with its bow on the left and the starboard deck edge just rising from the water.

Parbuckle salvage, or parbuckling, is the righting of a sunken vessel using rotational leverage. A common operation with smaller watercraft, parbuckling is also employed to right large vessels. In 1943, the USS Oklahoma was rotated nearly 180 degrees to upright after being sunk in the attack on Pearl Harbor, and the Italian cruise ship Costa Concordia was successfully parbuckled off the west coast of Italy in September 2013, the largest salvage operation of that kind to date.

== Mechanical advantage and difficulties ==
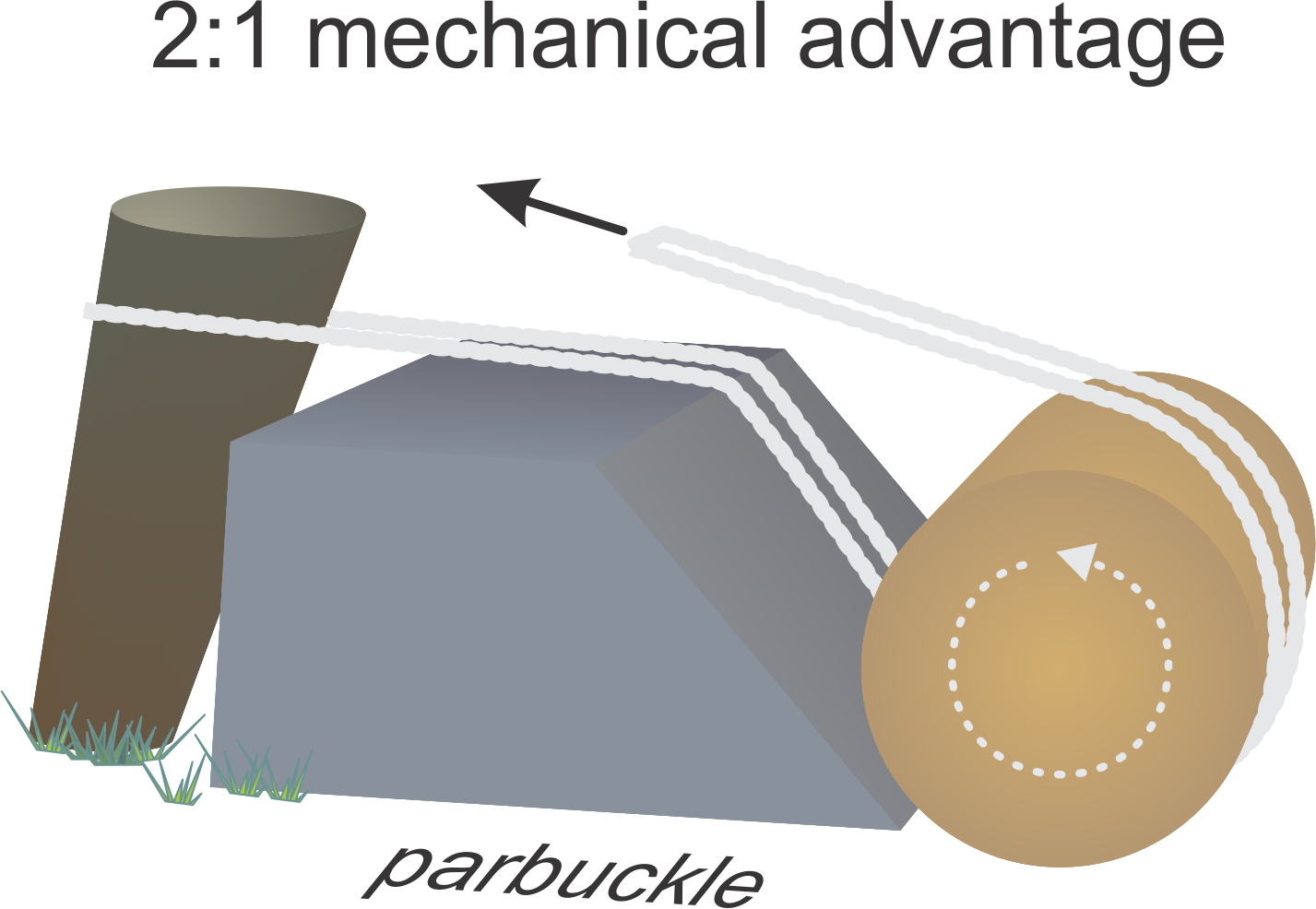
Parbuckling a cask up an incline

While the mechanical advantage used by a laborer to parbuckle a cask up an incline is 2:1, parbuckling salvage is not so limited. Each of the 21 winches used to roll the Oklahoma used cables that passed through two 17-part tackle assemblies (17:1 advantage). Eight 28-inch-diameter (710 mm) sheaves, eight 24-inch-diameter (610 mm) sheaves, and one 20-inch-diameter (510 mm) sheave comprised just half the mechanical effort.

A major concern during salvage is preventing rotational torque from becoming a transverse force moving the ship sideways. USS Utah, lost like the Oklahoma in the Pearl Harbor attack, was meant to be recovered by a similar rotation after the Oklahoma. As the Utah was rotated, however, its hull did not catch on the harbor bottom, and the vessel slid toward Ford Island. The Utah recovery effort was abandoned.

== Righting of Oklahoma ==
Oklahoma weighed about 35,000 short tons (32,000 metric tons). Twenty-one electric winches were installed on Ford Island, anchored in concrete foundations. They operated in unison. Each winch pulled about 20 short tons (18 metric tons) by a wire operated through a block system which gave an advantage of seventeen, for a total pull of 21×20×17, or 7,140 short tons (6,480 metric tons). In order to increase the leverage, the wire passed over a wooden strut arrangement (a bent) which stood on the bottom of the ship about 40 feet (12 meters) high.

Oil had been removed from the ship through the bottom. The ship was lightened by air inside the hull. There was a large amount of weight in the ship which may have been removed prior to righting, but not all could be accessed. About one-third of the ammunition was taken off together with some of the machinery. The blades of the two propellers were also taken off, but more to avoid damage to them than to reduce weight.

Tests were made to check whether restraining forces should be used to prevent sliding toward Ford Island. It was indicated that the soil under the aft part of the ship prevented sliding, whereas the bow section rested in soupy mud which permitted it. To prevent sliding, about 2200 tons of coral soil were deposited near the bow section. During righting, excess soil under the starboard side was washed away by high-pressure jets operated by divers.

The ship rolled as it should have and was right-side up by 16 June 1943, the work having started 8 March 1943. The mean draft of the ship after righting was c. 50 feet (15 meters).

Righting of Oklahoma

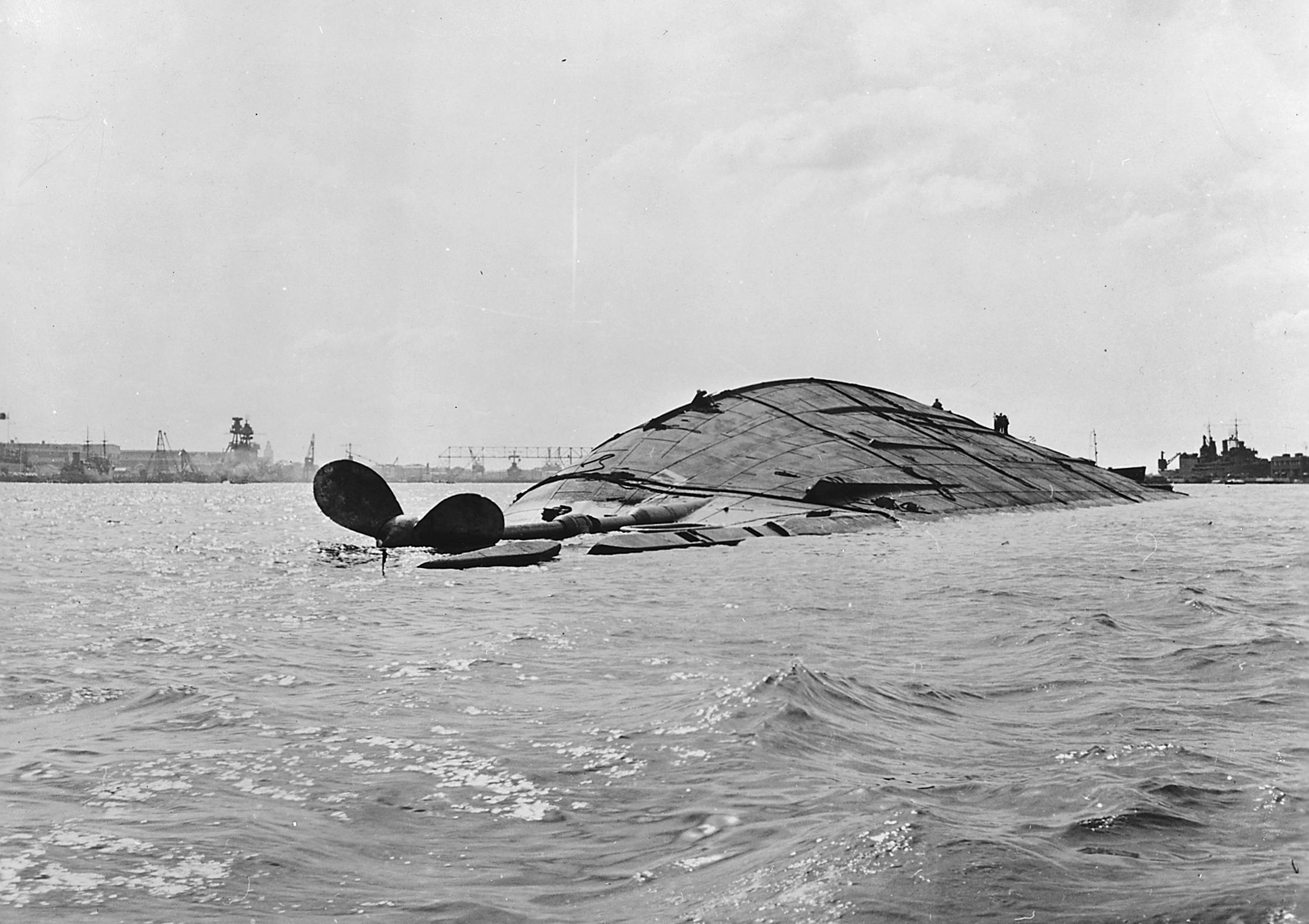
7 December 1941, USS Oklahoma overturned

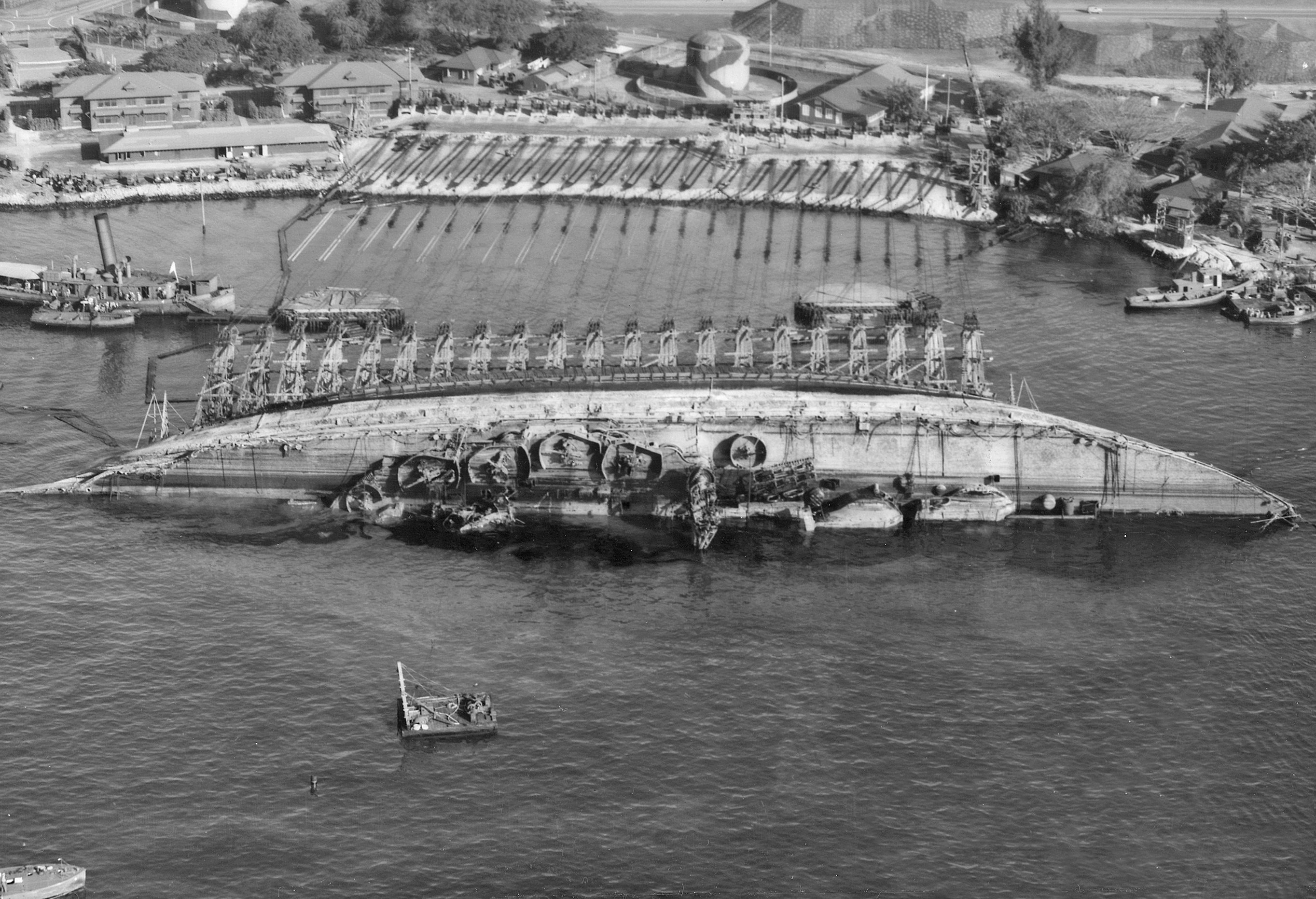
19 March 1943, USS Oklahoma's parbuckle salvage. Ship rotated 90 degrees.

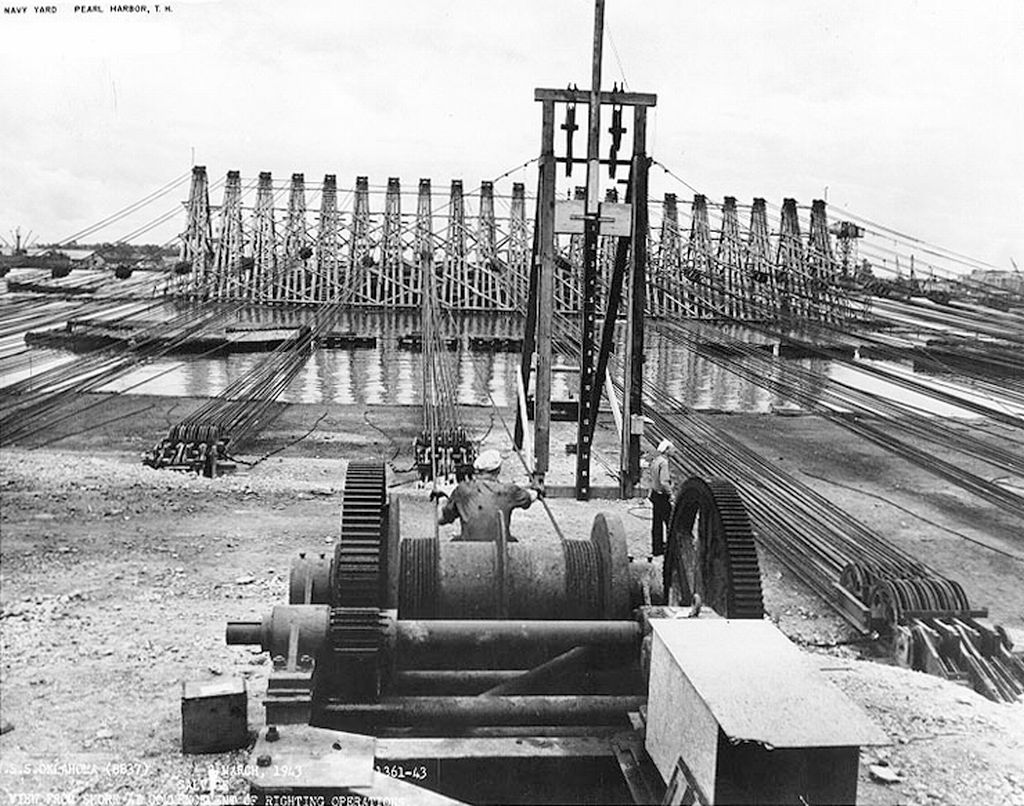
One of the 21 winches used to right Oklahoma, as positioned on Ford Island

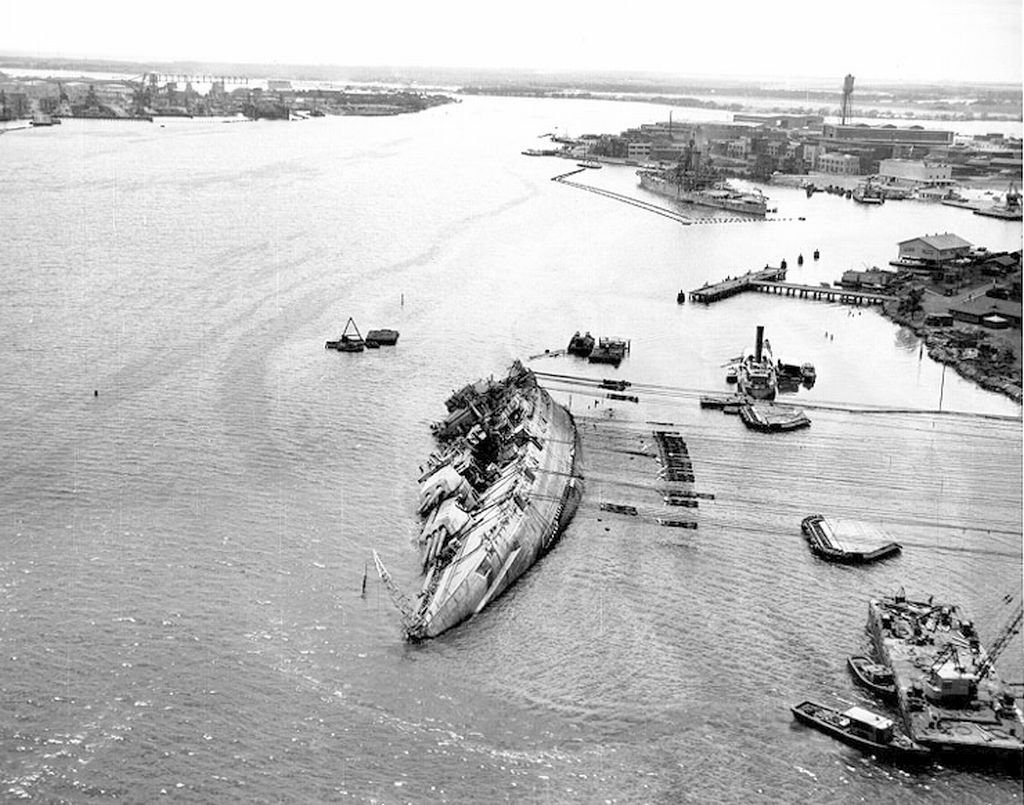
29 March 1943, Oklahoma righted to about 30 degrees. Ford Island is at right.

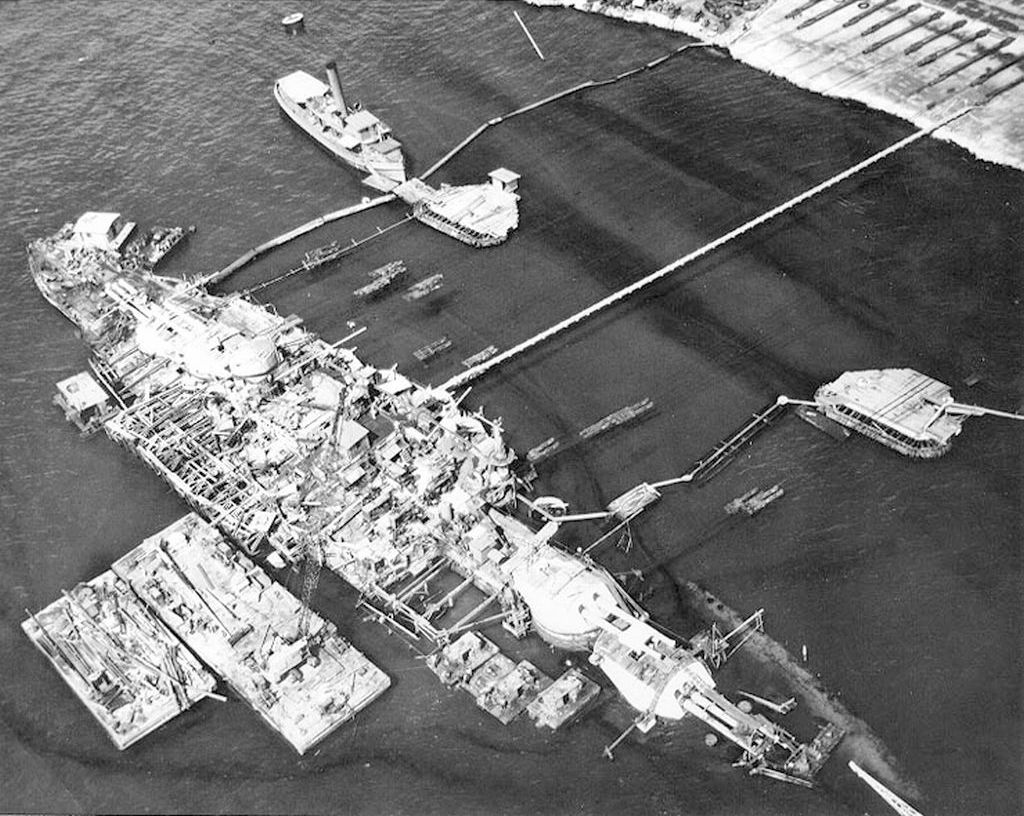
20 September 1943, Oklahoma fully righted, prior to refloating

== Righting of Costa Concordia ==
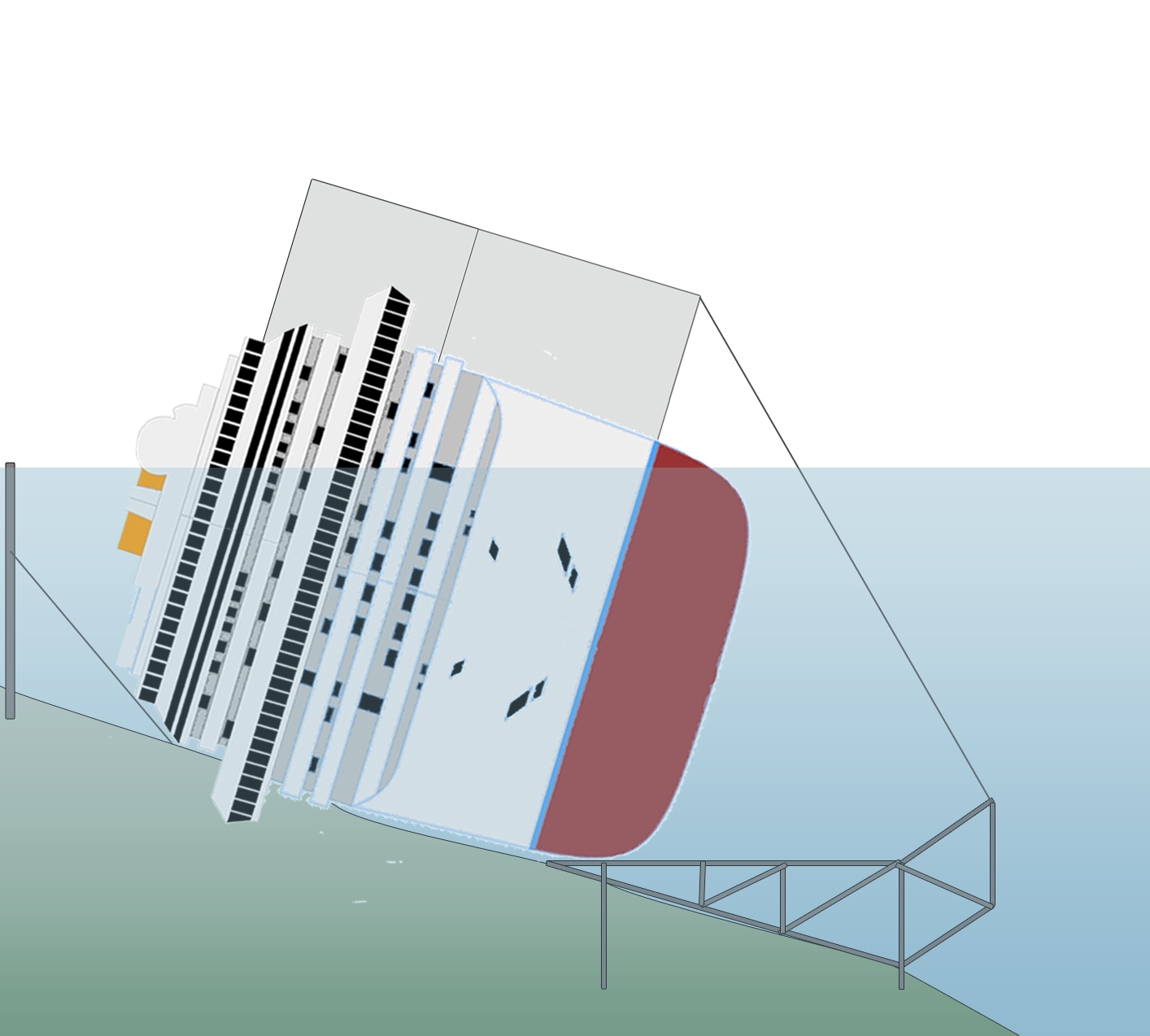
Costa Concordia parbuckling diagram: In this view looking north (facing bow), chains are on the left of the image (starboard side of ship, facing the coast), sponsons and cables on right side of the image (port side of the ship, facing deeper water). Not shown are the grout pads between the seabed and the platforms.

Following its capsizing and sinking in January 2012, the hull of Costa Concordia lay starboard side to the seaward face of a small outcropping very near the mouth of the harbor of Giglio, Italy, resting precariously on the incline to deeper water. To right the vessel, four key pieces of apparatus were required:

- a "holdback" system of chains attached to the island on one end and the hull on the other to ensure Costa Concordia rolled in place;
- a man-made ledge inserted into the island face to provide a landing surface for the vessel;
- a series of sponsons attached to the hull's port side so as, when flooded, to increase the torque on the hull and to unburden the strand jacks;
- an arrangement of cables rising from the edge of the ledge over the sponsons on the port side of the hull.

Tensioning the cables started the roll of the ship. At about the halfway-to-vertical position the sponsons were filled with seawater, and Costa Concordia completed its roll to upright upon the ledge. The hull was rotated 65 degrees to become vertical.

Parbuckling was accomplished in three phases:

1. Freeing the hull
2. Phase of rotation using cables
3. Rotation by ballasting with sponsons

At the completion of parbuckling, Costa Concordia rested on the ledge at a depth of 30 meters (98 feet).

=== Holdback system ===
The holdback system consisted of 56 chains in total, of which 22 chains were attached to the port side to go under the hull to the island. Each chain was 58 meters (190 ft) long and weighed about 26 metric tons (29 short tons). Each link weighed 205 kilograms (452 pounds).

=== Ledge ===
The ledge was part steel and part grout. There were six steel platforms. The three larger platforms measured 35 by 40 meters (115 by 131 feet) each; the three smaller platforms measured 15 by 5 meters (49 by 16 feet) each. The 6 platforms were supported by 21 pillars of 1.6 meters (5.2 feet) diameter each and plunged for an average of 9 meters (30 feet) in the granite sea face of Giglio. The grout filled the space between the land side of the platforms and the sea bed. It totaled 1,180 individual bags with a volume of over 12,000 cubic meters (16,000 cubic yards) and over 16,000 metric tons (18,000 short tons) in weight. The grout bags contained an "ecofriendly cement," and were built with eyelets to aid post-recovery cleanup.

=== Sponsons ===
Eleven steel sponsons were installed on the port side of the hull: two long horizontal sponsons; two long vertical sponsons and seven short vertical sponsons.

- Each long horizontal sponson
  - measured 33 by 11.5 by 10.5 meters (108 by 38 by 34 ft),
  - weighed about 540 metric tons (600 short tons),
  - provided 3,600 cubic meters (4,700 cubic yards) of buoyancy.
- Each long vertical sponson
  - measured 33 by 11.5 by 10.5 meters (108 by 38 by 34 ft),
  - weighed of about 523 metric tons (577 short tons),
  - provided about 3,600 cubic meters (4,700 cubic yards) of buoyancy.
- Each short vertical sponson
  - measured 21.8 by 11.5 by 10.5 meters (72 by 38 by 34 ft),
  - weighed about 400 metric tons (440 short tons),
  - provided about 2,400 cubic meters (3,100 cubic yards) of buoyancy.

Two steel "blister" tanks were connected together at the hull's bow. They measured 23 meters (75 feet) in length, 20 meters (66 feet) in height each, and had a total breadth of about 36 meters (118 feet). The whole blister structure (the two blister tanks, the tubular frame and the three anchor pipes) weighed about 1,700 metric tons (1,900 short tons). They provided a net buoyancy of 4,500 metric tons (5,000 short tons) to the bow section.

=== Cables ===
The cable system provided a force of about 23,800 metric tons (26,200 short tons) to start the Costa Concordia's rotation.

=== Phase 1 – freeing the hull ===
The hull of Costa Concordia rested on two spurs of rock, and was severely deformed from the weight of the ship pressing down on the spurs. This phase began when the strand jacks exerted force and the ship started to return to an upright position. This was "without doubt one of the most delicate phases of the entire recovery plan."

=== Phase 2 – rotation using cables ===
This phase began when the hull lifted from the seabed. Rotation continued by tensioning the cables operated by the strand jacks, and continued until the sponson water intakes reached sea level.

=== Phase 3 – rotation by ballasting with sponsons ===
The hull continued to rotate, pulled down by the weight of seawater added to the sponsons. The strand jacks and cables went slack. Redundant systems were designed as a guard against failure. For example, two seawater inlet valves were provided to each sponson.

Righting of Costa Concordia, 16–17 September 2013 (bow-on view)

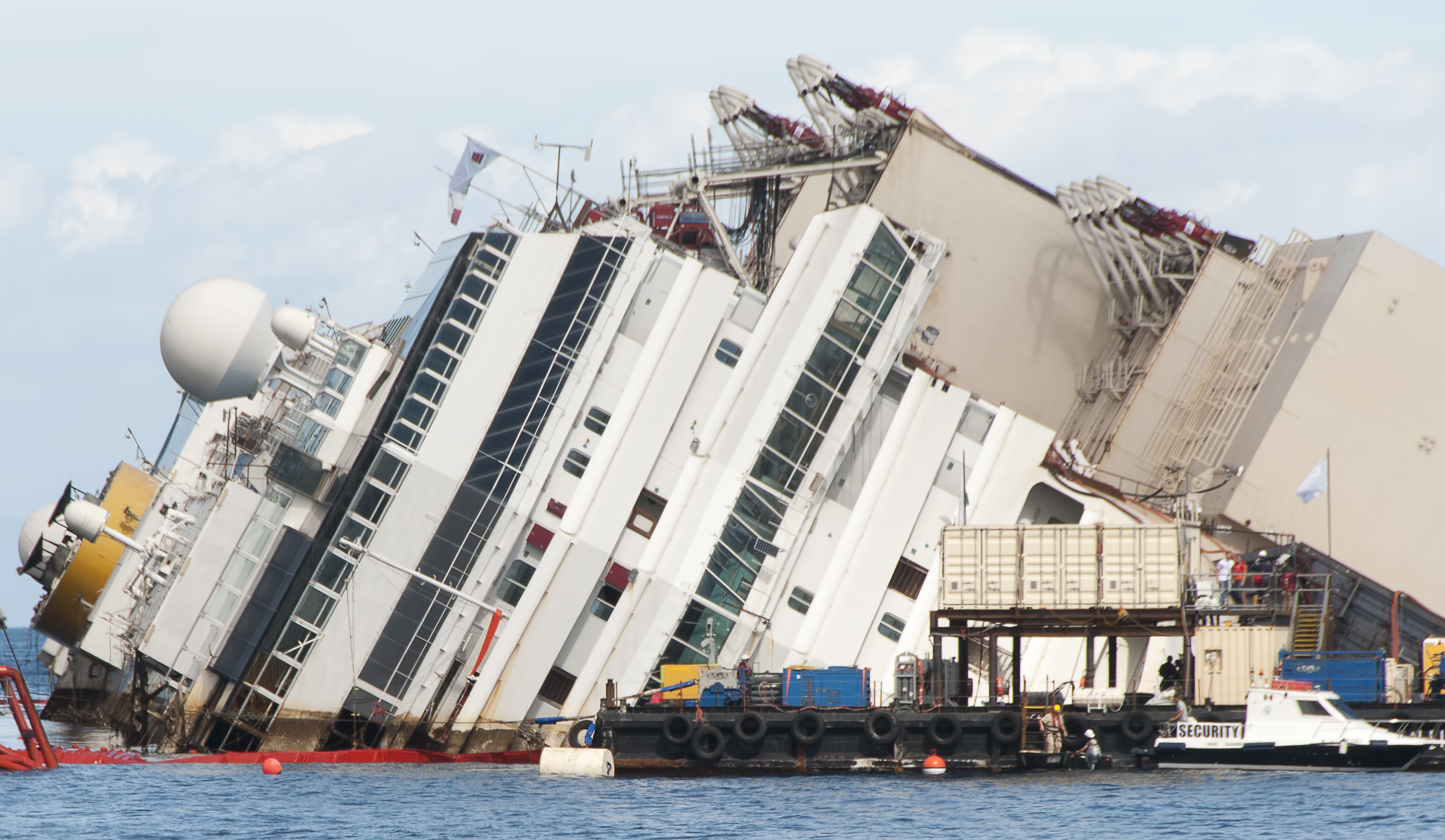
Operation in progress

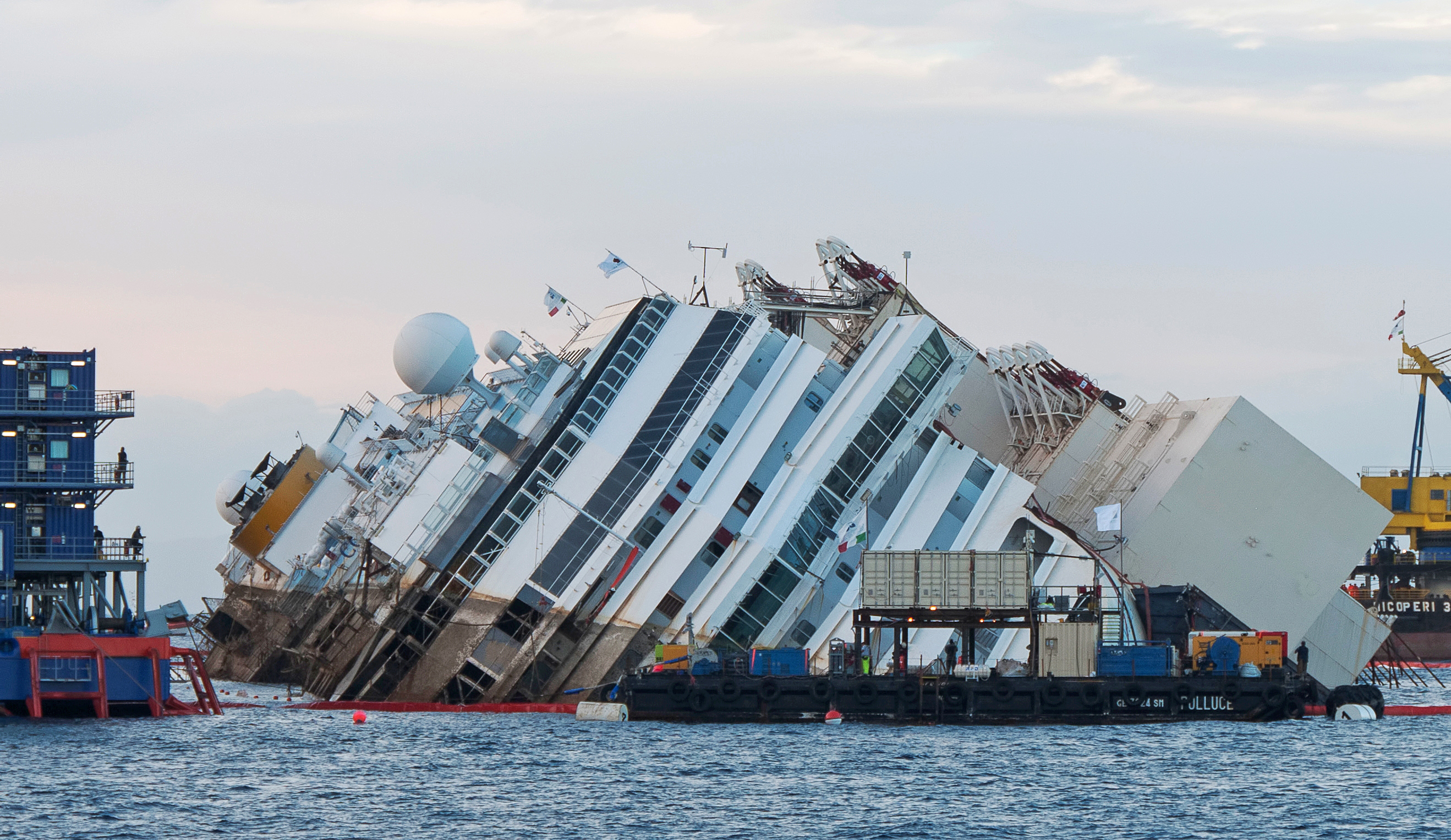
The operation continues but very slowly, at less than 2 degrees per hour

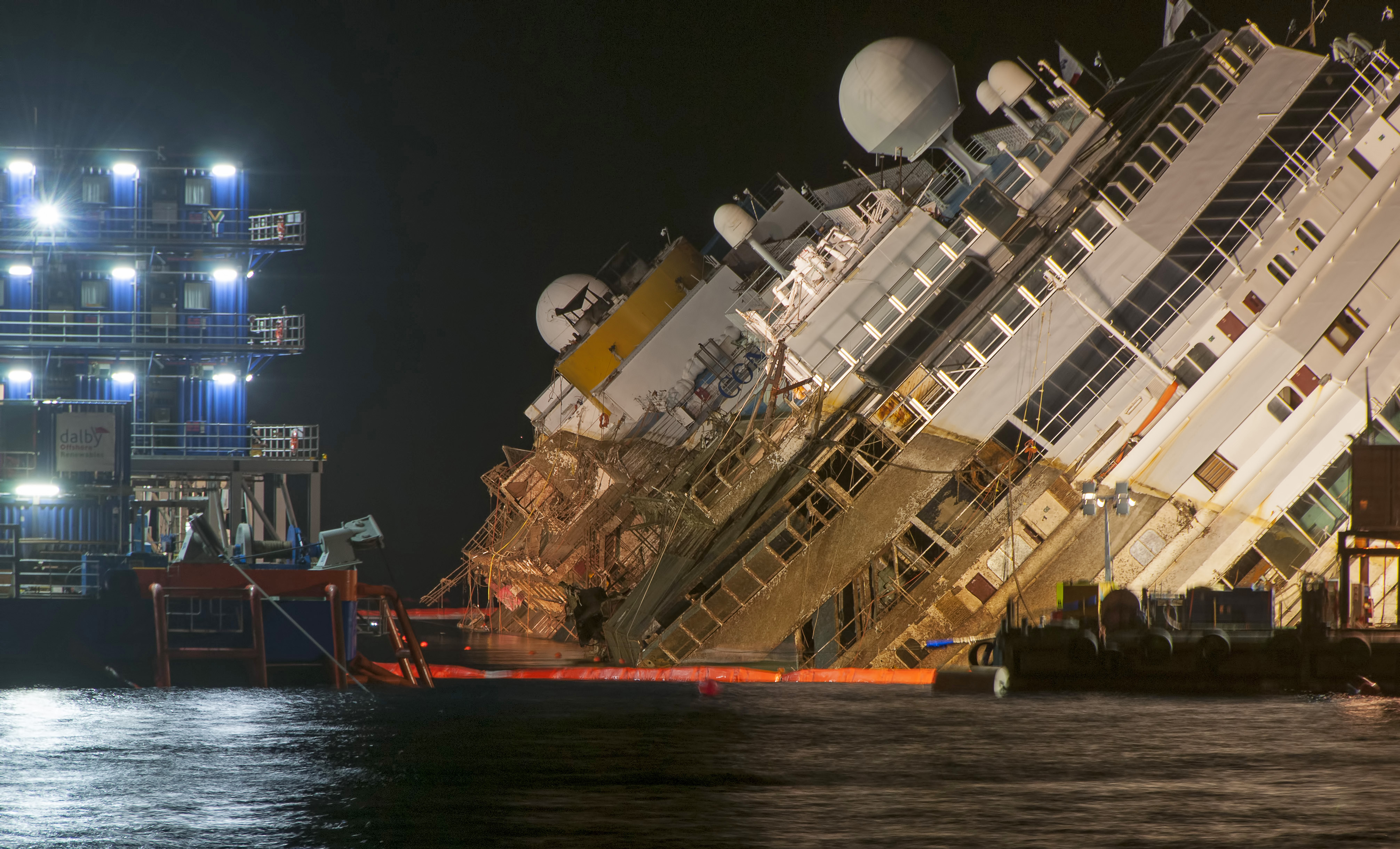
Sponsons are ready to fill with sea water, nearing 24 degrees of rotation.

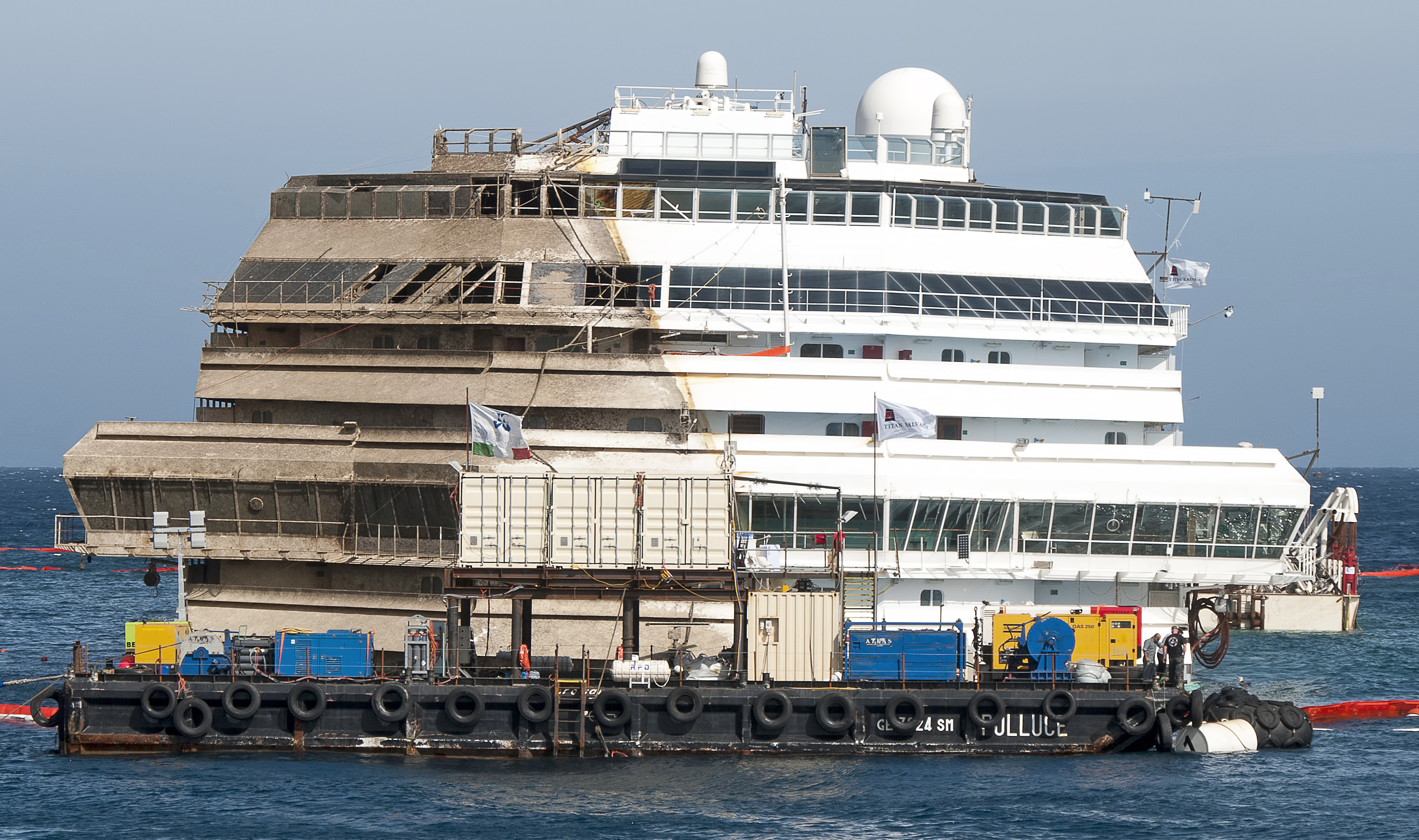
After the parbuckling

Righting of Costa Concordia (side views)

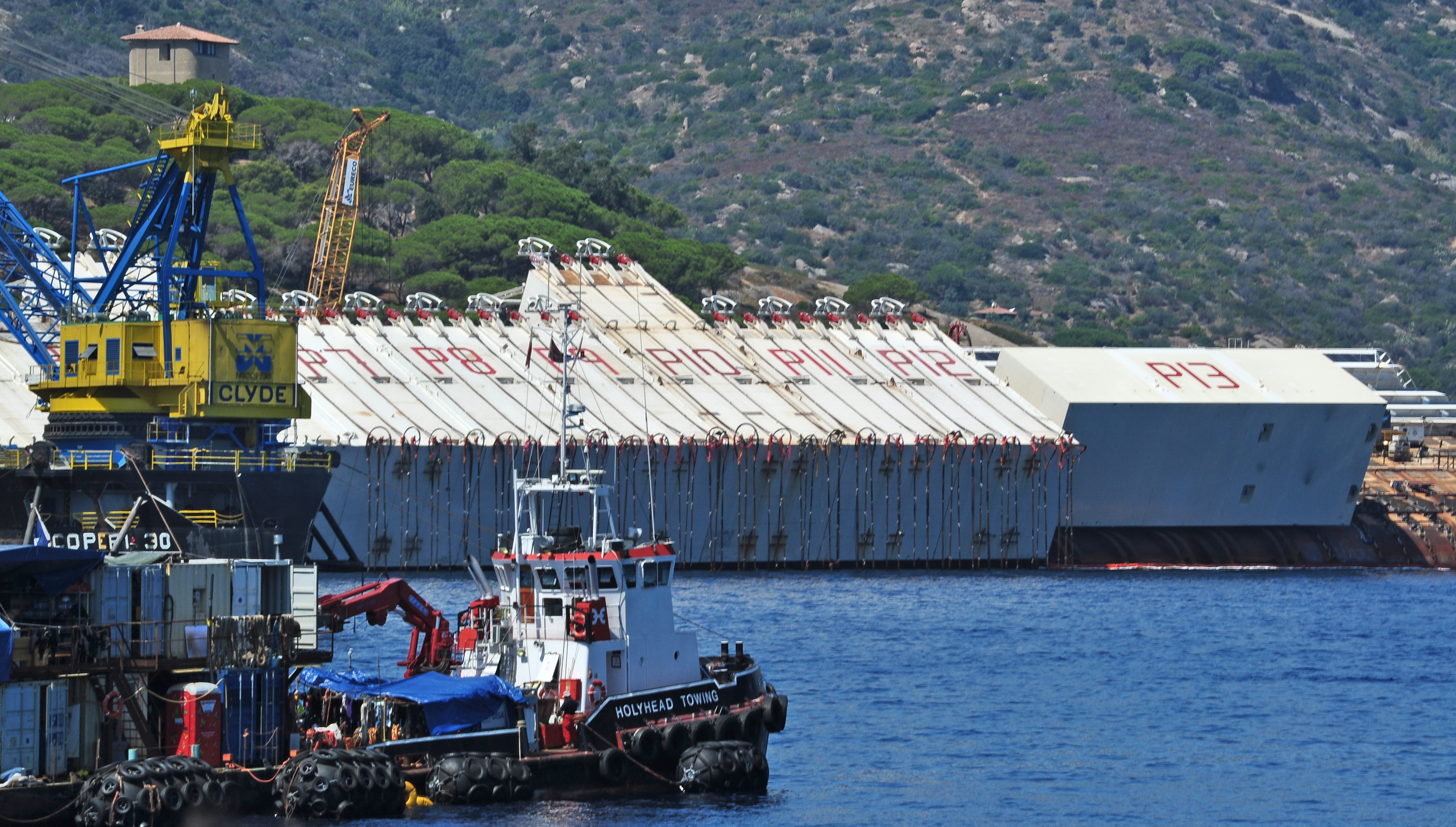
Port side with sponsons before righting

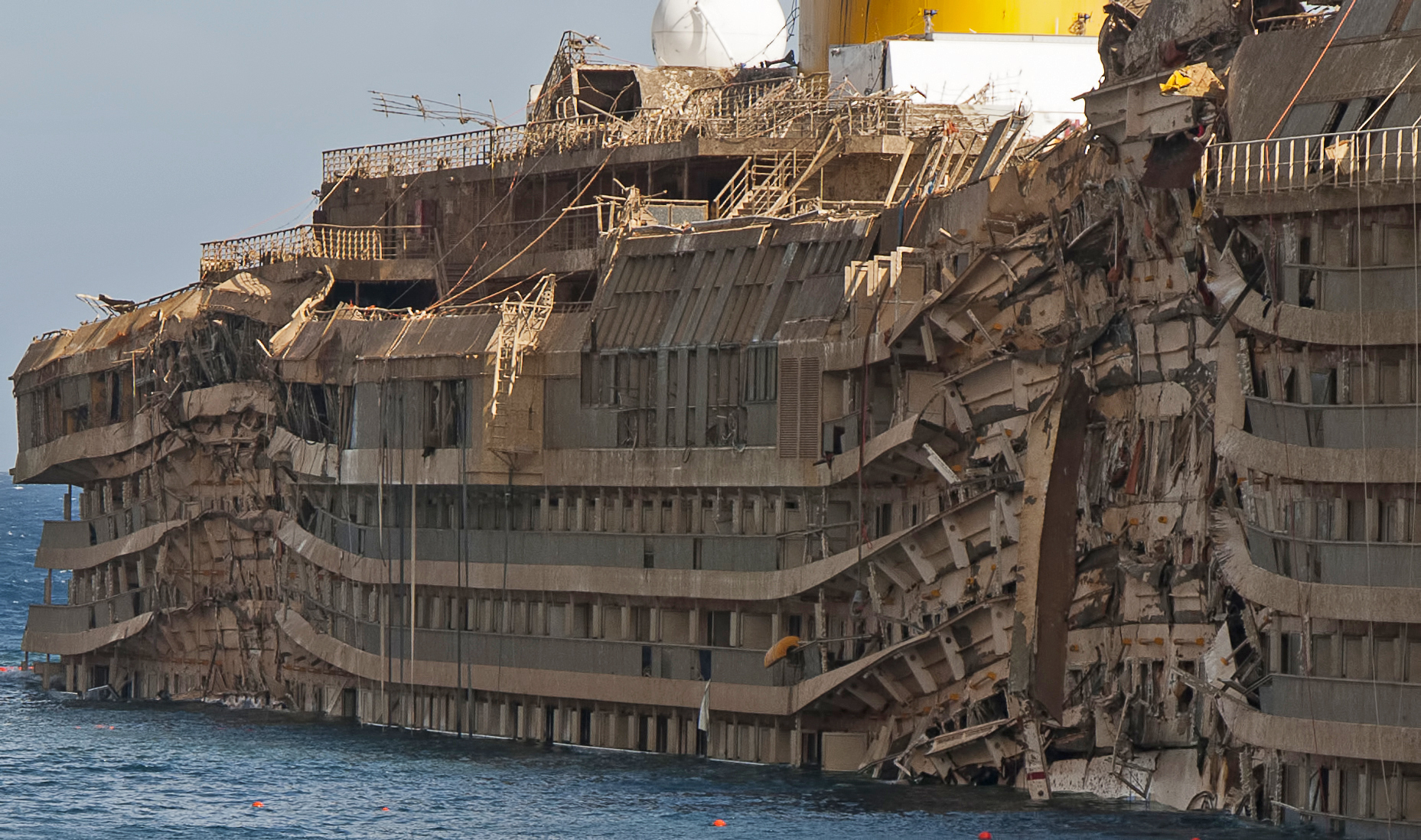
Crushed starboard side of the righted ship

== List of parbuckle-salvaged vessels ==
- USS Oklahoma
- MV Rocknes
- MV Lawrencecliffe Hall
- RPS Rajah Soliman
- USS Oglala
- RMS Empress of Canada
- Herald of Free Enterprise
- USS Reuben James
- MV Janra
- MV Repubblica di Genova
- MSC Napoli's separated stern section
- Barge Larvik Rock
- Fishing trawler Nieuwpoort 28
- Fishing vessel Sandy Point
- MS Costa Concordia
- Jackup work barge Sep Orion

== See also ==
- Marine salvage – Recovering a ship or cargo after a maritime casualty
