= RPS Rajah Soliman =

Philippine Naval destroyer

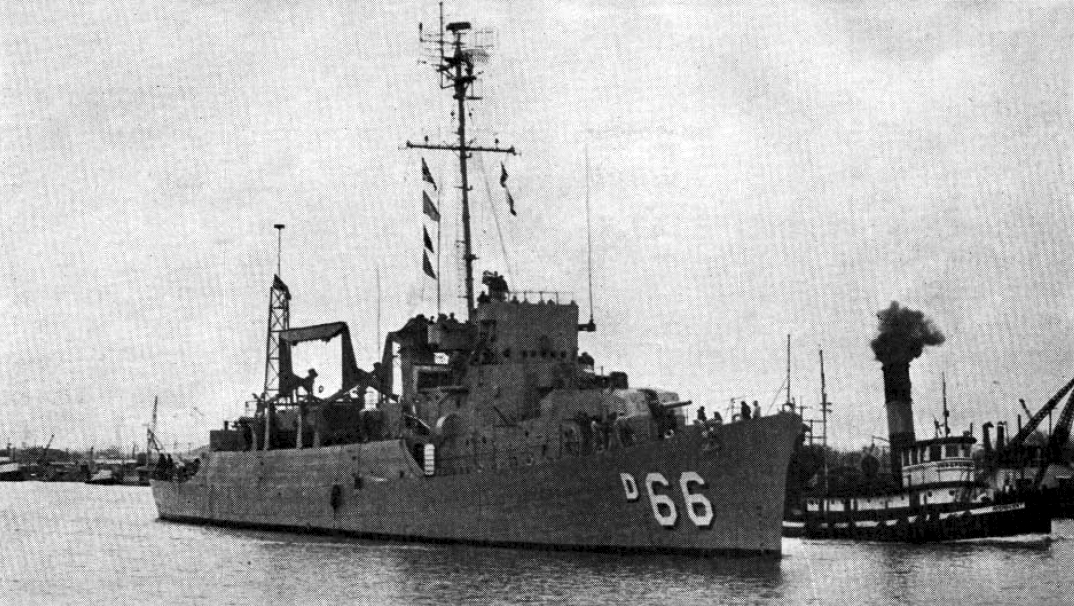
- RPS Rajah Soliman (D-66)

History

United States
- Name: USS Bowers
- Builder: Bethlehem Steel Shipyard Corp., San Francisco, California
- Laid down: 14 January 1943
- Launched: 31 October 1943
- Commissioned: 27 January 1944
- Recommissioned: 6 February 1951
- Decommissioned: 18 December 1958
- Stricken: 1 May 1961
- Identification: DE-637
- Fate: Loaned to Philippine Navy 31 October 1960, renamed as RPS Rajah Soliman (D-66). Sold outright to the Philippine government on 21 April 1961.

Philippines
- Name: RPS Rajah Soliman
- Operator: Philippine Navy
- Acquired: 31 October 1960
- Commissioned: unconfirmed
- Decommissioned: December 1964
- Stricken: December 1964
- Identification: D-66
- Fate: Sunk 29 June 1964, raised December 1964. Hulk sold to Mitsubishi International Corp., January 1966

General characteristics
- Class & type: Buckley-class destroyer escort/ Charles Lawrence-class high speed transport
- Displacement: 1,400 tons standard, 1,740 tons full load
- Length: 306 ft (93 m)
- Beam: 36.83 ft (11.23 m)
- Draft: 13.5 ft (4.1 m)
- Installed power: 12,000 hp (8,900 kW)
- Propulsion: 2 × GE "D" Express boilers turbines (Turbo Electric Drive); 2 × shafts
- Speed: 24 knots (44 km/h) maximum
- Range: 6,000 nmi (11,000 km) at 12 knots (22 km/h)
- Complement: 186
- Armament: 1 × 5-inch/38-caliber gun dual-purpose gun; 3 × Mk.1 Mod.2 Twin L/60-caliber Bofors 40 mm gun; 8 × Mk.10 70 caliber Oerlikon 20 mm cannon; 2 × Mk.9 depth charge racks

RPS Rajah Soliman (D-66) was a destroyer escort/frigate that served with the Philippine Navy between 1960 and 1964. A Buckley-class destroyer escort, it was originally named USS Bowers during its previous service with the United States Navy. It was the first destroyer escort to be operated by the Philippine Navy, and is the only member of its class ever operated by the service. Rajah Soliman was also the flagship of the Philippine Navy during its time in commission, which ended with the sinking of the vessel in 1964.

== Acquisition and service ==
The ex-USS Bowers was transferred to the Philippine Navy on 31 October 1960, as a loan under the terms of the Military Assistance Program; on 21 April 1961, the ship was sold outright to the Philippines. Rajah Soliman served as the Philippine Navy's flagship during her service life. In June 1964, the ship entered a refit period at the Bataan National Shipyard, located in Mariveles, Bataan, for repairs to her engine.

== Sinking, raising, and disposal ==
On 29 June 1964, Typhoon Winnie, also known as Typhoon Dading, hit the Bataan Peninsula; the storm surge associated with the cyclone struck Rajah Soliman, which was at the time docked at the shipyard's pier. The storm battered the ship's superstructure and starboard side against the pier, causing Rajah Soliman to capsize and sink at the dock. The effects of the storm also caused the wreck to fill with mud, sand and other debris.

After the storm, an attempt to salvage the ship was made by the Philippine Navy; the attempt failed as a result of the necessary equipment not being available. The United States Navy agreed to salvage the ship as a training exercise, and between December 1964 and January 1965, two U.S. Navy salvage ships, USS Grasp and USS Bolster, used the parbuckle salvage technique to raise Rajah Soliman's wreck from the harbor floor. After the vessel had been successfully raised, it was towed to the Ship Repair Facility at Subic Naval Base, located nearby.

A survey of the raised Rajah Soliman found that the ship had been damaged beyond economical repair. Designated for disposal, the hulk was sold for scrapping on 31 January 1966 to Mitsubishi International Corp.
