= List of shipwrecks in 2000 =

The list of shipwrecks in 2000 includes ships sunk, foundered, grounded, or otherwise lost during 2000.

table of contents
2000
Jan	Feb	Mar	Apr
May	Jun	Jul	Aug
Sep	Oct	Nov	Dec
Unknown date

== January ==
=== 1 January ===
List of shipwrecks: 1 January 2000
Ship	State	Description
Ais Mamas	Cyprus	The bulk carrier sprang a leak 45 nautical miles (83 km) north west of Cape Columbine, South Africa and was abandoned by all 25 people on board. They were rescued by Grif (Flag unknown). Ais Mamas was towed in to Saldanha Bay, where she was declared a constructive total loss. She arrived at Alang, India for scrapping on 24 March.

=== 2 January ===
List of shipwrecks: 2 January 2000
Ship	State	Description
Tiksy	Cambodia	The cargo ship foundered in the Black Sea 30 nautical miles (56 km) off Tuapse, Russia. Her twelve crew were rescued.

=== 4 January ===
List of shipwrecks: 4 January 2000
Ship	State	Description
Raduga	United States	The 35-foot (11 m) longline cod-fishing vessel capsized and sank in the Gulf of Alaska approximately 5 nautical miles (9.3 km; 5.8 mi) off Cape Chiniak (57°37′N 152°10′W) on Kodiak Island after her fiberglass hull fractured. Her three-man crew survived, a United States Coast Guard helicopter rescuing two of them from a life raft and the other from the water.

=== 7 January ===
List of shipwrecks: 7 January 2000
Ship	State	Description
J. Marion Sky	Singapore	The bulk carrier collided with the heavy lift ship Industrial Century (Antigua and Barbuda) and sank 100 nautical miles (190 km) west north west of Grand Cayman Island. Nineteen of her 21 crew were rescued, two were reported missing.

=== 10 January ===
List of shipwrecks: 10 January 2000
Ship	State	Description
Grand Arabella	Liberia	The ro-ro ship foundered in the Indian Ocean (15°54′N 53°24′E). Her seventeen crew were rescued by the container ship Kota Perdana (Flag unknown).
Otliv	Russia	The fishing vessel ran aground in the Strait of Tartary (46°14′N 141°54′E). She was a total loss.
Saratoga	Cyprus	The refrigerated cargo ship caught fire at Havana, Cuba. She was declared a constructive total loss and scrapped in Mexico.

=== 11 January ===
List of shipwrecks: 11 January 2000
Ship	State	Description
Halgafelli	Faroe Islands	The cargo ship ran aground north of the Anda Lighthouse, Norway and was abandoned by her seven crew. She floated off later that day and sank west of Nordmela (69°06′N 15°45′E)
Solway Harvester	United Kingdom	Solway Harvester, October 2007 The scallop dredger capsized and sank in the Irish Sea with the loss of all seven crew. The wreck was later refloated and moored at Douglas, Isle of Man.

=== 13 January ===
List of shipwrecks: 20 January 2000
Ship	State	Description
Viveros IV	Panama	The cargo ship struck the breakwater at Bocas de Ceniza, Columbia and sank.

=== 16 January ===
List of shipwrecks: 20 January 2000
Ship	State	Description
Ross Alcedo	United Kingdom	The fishing vessel caught fire in the Atlantic Ocean (50°25′N 6°56′W. She was towed in to Falmouth, Cornwall the next day. Declared a total loss, she was consequently scrapped.

=== 18 January ===
List of shipwrecks: 20 January 2000
Ship	State	Description
Panda I	Indonesia	The ro-ro ship capsized and sank 5 nautical miles (9.3 km) west of Ujung Kulonam.

=== 20 January ===
List of shipwrecks: 20 January 2000
Ship	State	Description
Yu Tai No.6	Taiwan	The cargo ship foundered in the South China Sea (24°57′N 120°30′E) with the loss of all but one of her crew.

=== 21 January ===
List of shipwrecks: 21 January 2000
Ship	State	Description
Abdul Kader	Syria	The cargo ship was driven ashore at Latakia. She was refloated on 27 February and towed to Tartous, where she was declared a constructive total loss. She was beached at Aliağa, Turkey for scrapping on 4 April.

=== 26 January ===
List of shipwrecks: 26 January 2000
Ship	State	Description
Don Martin	Philippines	The passenger ship capsized in the Bohol Sea and was presumed to have foundered.

=== 27 January ===
List of shipwrecks: 27 January 2000
Ship	State	Description
Phoenix Seven	Panama	The cargo ship foundered in the Taiwan Strait (25°17′N 121°42′E). Her crew were rescued.
Rui Da	Saint Vincent and the Grenadines	The cargo ship foundered in the South China Sea (11°47′N 109°54′E). Her 25 crew were rescued.

=== 28 January ===
List of shipwrecks: 28 January 2000
Ship	State	Description
Yiaw Yang	Malaysia	The cargo ship foundered in the South China Sea (15°31′N 117°03′E). Her crew were rescued.

=== 29 January ===
List of shipwrecks: 29 January 2000
Ship	State	Description
Ermak	United States	The 35-foot (10.7 m) fishing trawler sank approximately 40 nautical miles (74 km; 46 mi) south of Seward, Alaska, after her lazarette flooded. The fishing vessel Helios (United States) rescued her crew of three.

=== 30 January ===
List of shipwrecks: 30 January 2000
Ship	State	Description
Sletreal	Liberia	The tanker exploded and broke in two at Cárdenas, Cuba. Three of her crew were reported missing. She was a total loss.

=== 31 January ===
List of shipwrecks: 31 January 2000
Ship	State	Description
Enap I	Chile	The ro-ro ship capsized and sank at Punta Atracadero. Her crew were rescued.

=== Unknown date ===
List of shipwrecks: unknown date in January 2000
Ship	State	Description
Corah Ann	Belize	The ship foundered in the Caribbean Sea off the coast of Honduras. Two of her crew were reported missing.

== February ==
=== 1 February ===
List of shipwrecks: 11 February 2000
Ship	State	Description
Pep Nautic	Saint Vincent and the Grenadines	The bulk carrier suffered an engine breakdown off Luanda, Angola. She was towed in to Luanda. Declared a constructive total loss, she was subsequently scrapped at Alang, India.

=== 6 February ===
List of shipwrecks: 6 February 2000
Ship	State	Description
El Cabello Grande, and Rio Motatan	Venezuela	The tug El Cabello Grande caught fire, exploded, collided with the tug Rio Motatan and sank in the Gulf of Venezuela. Her crew were rescued. Rio Motatan, which was under tow of El Cabello Grande, also sank.

=== 10 February ===
List of shipwrecks: 10 February 2000
Ship	State	Description
Ghareb	Belize	The offshore supply vessel capsized and sank off the coast of Abu Dhabi with the loss of one of her ten crew. The wreck was subsequently refloated.

=== 11 February ===
List of shipwrecks: 11 February 2000
Ship	State	Description
American Star	United States	The 442-gross ton, 139.1-foot (42.4 m) or 154-foot (46.9 m) crab-fishing vessel was abandoned in the North Pacific Ocean after a serious engine room fire broke out aboard her. A helicopter from the high endurance cutter USCGC Mellon ( United States Coast Guard) rescued all five people and a dog who had been aboard. The fire damaged American Star′s engine room and destroyed her pilothouse, and she eventually drifted ashore on the south coast of Unimak Island in the Aleutian Islands 2 nautical miles (3.7 km; 2.3 mi) east of Cape Lazaref (54°37′00″N 163°35′10″W) and became a total loss. Many months later, her wreck was towed out to sea, cut up, and scuttled in deep water.

=== 13 February ===
List of shipwrecks: 13 February 2000
Ship	State	Description
Zafir	Portugal	The cargo ship collided with Espresso Catania (Italy) and sank 7 nautical miles (13 km) off Punta Stilo, Italy (38°34′N 16°42′E). Three of her crew died, ten were reported missing.

=== 16 February ===
List of shipwrecks: 16 February 2000
Ship	State	Description
Dae Woong No.5	South Korea	The fishing vessel collided with the fishing vessel Shinwoo No.111 (South Korea) and sank in the Atlantic Ocean (49°36′S 61°16′W). Her 29 crew were rescued.

=== 17 February ===
List of shipwrecks: 17 February 2000
Ship	State	Description
Thor Emilie	Denmark	The cargo ship exploded, caught fire and sank in the Mediterranean Sea (37°32′N 2°11′E). Six of her seven crew were reported missing.

=== 18 February ===
List of shipwrecks: 18 February 2000
Ship	State	Description
Lam Son 04	Vietnam	The cargo ship collided with Palembang Caraka Jaya Niaga III-37 (Indonesia) and sank 20 nautical miles (37 km) off Hòn Dáu Island (20°40′N 106°49′E). Three of her crew were reported missing.

=== 20 February ===
List of shipwrecks: 21 February 2000
Ship	State	Description
Jessica Ann	United States	The fishing vessel ran aground and sank 2 nautical miles (3.7 km) south of Cape Elizabeth, Maine. Her five crew were rescued.

=== 21 February ===
List of shipwrecks: 21 February 2000
Ship	State	Description
Lina Star	Syria	The cargo ship foundered in Vatika Bay (36°30′N 23°01′E). Her eight crew were rescued.

=== 22 February ===
List of shipwrecks: 22 February 2000
Ship	State	Description
Hoorbai II	Mozambique	Cyclone Eline: The cargo ship sank at Beira.

=== 23 February ===
List of shipwrecks: 23 February 2000
Ship	State	Description
vestkyst	Norway	The cargo ship sank in the Kvinnherafjord. Her three crew were rescued.

=== 25 February ===
List of shipwrecks: 25 February 2000
Ship	State	Description
Kingston	Finland	The fishing vessel foundered north of the Åland Islands.

=== 28 February ===
List of shipwrecks: 28 February 2000
Ship	State	Description
Hualien No.1	Taiwan	The bulk carrier was last heard of in the Taiwan Strait on this date. She was on a voyage from Hualien to Tanshue. Reported missing with 21 crew aboard.
Stavraetos	Greece	cargo ship caught fire in the Indian Ocean (6°46′N 91°15′E). She was taken in tow, arriving at Singapore on 13 March. Declared a constructive total loss, she arrived at Xinhui, China for scrapping on 5 June.

=== 29 February ===
List of shipwrecks: 29 February 2000
Ship	State	Description
Tokua Maru	Japan	The bulk carrier collided with Hyakuchi Maru No.2 (Japan) in the Kudako Channel and sank.

== March ==
=== 1 March ===
List of shipwrecks: 1 March 2000
Ship	State	Description
Golden Dragon	Cambodia	The cargo ship was presumed to have foundered in the Taiwan Strait (21°00′N 118°00′E) on this date. Sixteen of her 22 crew were rescued. Four died and two were reported missing.

=== 4 March ===
List of shipwrecks: 4 March 2000
Ship	State	Description
Iugo	Romania	The cargo ship foundered in the North Sea (52°13′01″N 3°30′00″E). All ten people on board were rescued. The wreck was subsequently cut up and removed.

=== 8 March ===
List of shipwrecks: 8 March 2000
Ship	State	Description
Cape Fear	United States	The retired 112-foot (34.1 m) fishing trawler and clam dredger was scuttled as an artificial reef in the North Atlantic Ocean south of Long Island 2.5 nautical miles (4.6 km; 2.9 mi) off Moriches Inlet, New York.
Gada	Egypt	The cargo ship sank at Alexandria.

=== 9 March ===
List of shipwrecks: 9 March 2000
Ship	State	Description
Seafresh 1	New Zealand	The fishing vessel caught fire in the Pacific Ocean (43°20′S 176°45′W). the fire was extinguished and she was taken in tow for the Chatham Islands, where she sank on 17 March.

=== 10 March ===
List of shipwrecks: 10 March 2000
Ship	State	Description
Kastor Too	Greece	The bulk carrier suffered an engine room fire and sank in the Indian Ocean (13°00′N 53°13′W). Her eighteen crew were rescued.

=== 18 March ===
List of shipwrecks: 18 March 2000
Ship	State	Description
BCM Atlantic	Canada	The fishing vessel struck a submerged object, possibly an iceberg, and sank in the Atlantic Ocean 130 nautical miles (240 km) east of Goose Bay, Labrador. Her 26 crew were rescued.

=== 19 March ===
List of shipwrecks: 19 March 2000
Ship	State	Description
Ana Mercedes	Saint Vincent and the Grenadines	The cargo ship sprang a leak and sank in the Atlantic Ocean (14°15′N 68°46′W). Her ten crew were rescued.

=== 23 March ===
List of shipwrecks: 23 March 2000
Ship	State	Description
Annandale	United Kingdom	The fishing vessel was abandoned in the North Sea. Her crew were rescued by the fishing vessel Endeavour (United Kingdom), which took her in tow. Annandale subsequently foundered (60°06′N 0°38′W).
Leader L.	Panama	The bulk carrier foundered in the Atlantic Ocean 360 nautical miles (670 km) north east of Bermuda (35°43′N 58°14′W). Of her 31 crew, six died, twelve were reported missing and thirteen survived.
Raven	United States	While under tow to Sitka, Alaska, by the fishing vessel Seattle (United States) after her hull was holed by a stabilizer, the 37-foot (11.3 m) fishing trawler capsized and sank in Sitka Sound in Southeast Alaska about 12 nautical miles (22 km; 14 mi) from Sitka. The only person on board survived.

=== 24 March ===
List of shipwrecks: 24 March 2000
Ship	State	Description
Leader L	Panama	The cargo ship sank at Atlantic Ocean 400 miles northeast of Bermuda with 13 crew rescued & 5 bodies had recovered.

=== 28 March ===
List of shipwrecks: 28 March 2000
Ship	State	Description
Martina	Liberia	The chemical tanker collided with Werder Bremen (Antigua and Barbuda) off the Hoganas Peninsula, Sweden (56°16′N 12°25′E and sank with the loss of five of her 20 crew.

=== 30 March ===
List of shipwrecks: 30 March 2000
Ship	State	Description
USCGC Point Swift	United States Coast Guard	The decommissioned 83-foot (25.3 m) Point-class cutter was scuttled as an artificial reef in the North Atlantic Ocean off Cape May, New Jersey, at 38°51.620′N 074°40.600′W.
Revenge	Romania	The cargo ship suffered an explosion in her engine room at Chittagong, Bangladesh. She was beached in the Chilimpur River on 3 April.

=== 31 March ===
List of shipwrecks: 31 March 2000
Ship	State	Description
Trouble	United States	The 50-foot (15 m) longline halibut-fishing vessel capsized and sank in the Gulf of Alaska 7 nautical miles (13 km; 8.1 mi) off Black Point at the south end of Sitkalidak Island in Alaska. A United States Coast Guard helicopter rescued her entire crew of three from a life raft.

=== Unknown date ===
List of shipwrecks: Unknown date March 2000
Ship	State	Description
PNS Taimur	Pakistan Navy	The decommissioned Gearing-class destroyer was sunk as a target.

== April ==
=== 1 April ===
List of shipwrecks: 1 April 2000
Ship	State	Description
Kingfisher	Malta	The tanker ran aground at Cilacap, Indonesia. She was refloated with the assistance of a tug. Declared a constructive total loss, she was scrapped at Chittagong, Bangladesh.

=== 9 April ===
List of shipwrecks: 9 April 2000
Ship	State	Description
Raysut Cement I	Honduras	The bulk carrier sank at Salalah, Oman. Her 12 crew survived.

=== 11 April ===
List of shipwrecks: 11 April 2000
Ship	State	Description
Panagia Soumela	Greece	The tanker ran aground at Ain Sokhna, Egypt. She was refloated on 18 April with the assistance of a number of tugs and taken in to Suez. Declared a constructive total loss, she was subsequently scrapped at Alang, India.

=== 12 April ===
List of shipwrecks: 12 April 2000
Ship	State	Description
Gran Rio R.	Saint Vincent and the Grenadines	The cargo ship was presumed to have foundered off Tobago. Her nine crew were reported missing.

=== 14 April ===
List of shipwrecks: 14 April 2000
Ship	State	Description
Bu Il	South Korea	The chemical tanker collided with Sunyang Chemi I (Panama) and capsized off Cheju Island (32°37′04″N 125°39′06″E). She sank on 17 April. Her thirteen crew were rescued.

=== 16 April ===
List of shipwrecks: 16 April 2000
Ship	State	Description
Sun Bird	Saint Vincent and the Grenadines	The research vessel foundered in the Atlantic Ocean (13°04′N 69°51′W). Her thirteen crew were rescued.

=== 17 April ===
List of shipwrecks: 17 April 2000
Ship	State	Description
Viva Penafrancia II	Philippines	The passenger ship struck a reef between Mindoro Island and Batangas. She was taken in tow, but sank 6 nautical miles (11 km) off Batangas. All on board were rescued.

=== 19 April ===
List of shipwrecks: 19 April 2000
Ship	State	Description
Helios III	Belize	The cargo ship collided with Asama (Flag unknown) and sank in the Laotieshan Channel 40 nautical miles (74 km) off Dalian, China. Her eight crew were rescued.

=== 20 April ===
List of shipwrecks: 20 April 2000
Ship	State	Description
Destiny	United States	The 96-foot (29.3 m) crab-fishing vessel sank in 540 feet (160 m) of water northwest of Rocky Point (57°39′45″N 154°13′50″W) on the west coast of Alaska′s Kodiak Island. Wearing survival suits, her crew of five abandoned ship in a life raft and was rescued by the fishing vessel Polar Star (United States).

=== 22 April ===
List of shipwrecks: 22 April 2000
Ship	State	Description
Mera I	United Kingdom	The fishing vessel foundered in the Atlantic Ocean (49°50′N 11°24′W). Her thirteen crew were rescued.
Sea Queen	Saint Vincent and the Grenadines	The bulk carrier suffered a hull fracture at Mina Saqr, United Arab Emirates. Declared a constructive total loss, she was beached at Alang, India for scrapping on 15 October.

=== 30 April ===
List of shipwrecks: 30 April 2000
Ship	State	Description
La Paloma	United States	The 28-foot (8.5 m) sloop sank in the Gulf of Alaska approximately 50 nautical miles (93 km; 58 mi) southwest of Yakutat, Alaska. The cutter USCGC Anacapa ( United States Coast Guard) rescued the only person on board.
World Discoverer	Liberia	The wreck of World Discoverer in July 2007 The cruise ship hit an uncharted reef in the Sandfly Passage around the Solomon Islands and was grounded at Roderick Bay, Ngella island. She was declared a constructive total loss.

== May ==
=== 1 May ===
List of shipwrecks: 1 May 2000
Ship	State	Description
Progress	United Kingdom	The fishing vessel foundered in the North Sea (57°00′N 0°31′E). Her crew were rescued.

=== 6 May ===
List of shipwrecks: 6 May 2000
Ship	State	Description
Dalia S.	Syria	The cargo ship sprang a leak and sank off Alexandria, Egypt. Her twelve crew were rescued.
Melrivic-3	Philippines	The ro-ro ship capsized and sank at Isabel, Leyte.

=== 14 May ===
List of shipwrecks: 14 May 2000
Ship	State	Description
Chwan Yi No.1	Belize	The fishing vessel foundered in the Atlantic Ocean (37°11′25″S 8°03′18″E). Her 23 crew and two ship's dogs were rescued by the bulk carrier Rahmi Pak (Flag unknown).

=== 15 May ===
List of shipwrecks: 15 May 2000
Ship	State	Description
Skryplyov	Russia	The cargo ship foundered in Valentine Bay (43°03′N 134°20′E). Her fourteen crew were rescued.

=== 17 May ===
List of shipwrecks: 17 May 2000
Ship	State	Description
Sky 1	Honduras	The cargo ship foundered off Masirah Island, Oman. Her crew were rescued.

=== 19 May ===
List of shipwrecks: 19 May 2000
Ship	State	Description
Evelyn	Malta	The bulk carrier caught fire east of Aden and sank (12°59′N 47°58′E). Her nineteen crew were rescued by Stolt Vestland (Liberia).

=== 22 May ===
List of shipwrecks: 22 May 2000
Ship	State	Description
Leslie Lee	United States	The fishing vessel capsized and sank 9 nautical miles (17 km) west of Trinidad Head, California. Her three crew were rescued.

=== 23 May ===
List of shipwrecks: 23 May 2000
Ship	State	Description
SLNS Lihiniya	Sri Lanka Navy	Sri Lankan Civil War: The transport was sunk by the Liberation Tigers of Tamil Eelam.

=== 24 May ===
List of shipwrecks: 24 May 2000
Ship	State	Description
Kaiho Maru	Japan	The cargo ship collided with Toshin Maru (Japan) and sank 3 nautical miles (5.6 km) off the Inubōsaki Lighthouse.

=== 27 May ===
List of shipwrecks: 27 May 2000
Ship	State	Description
Countess	Panama	The bulk carrier sprang a leak at Paradip Port, India. Declared a constructive total loss, she arrived at Alang, India for scrapping on 16 September.
Orsay	Turkey	The cargo ship foundered in the Mediterranean Sea 20 nautical miles (37 km) south east of Cape Spartivento, Sardinia, Italy (37°28′N 16°06′E). Her crew were rescued.

=== 29 May ===
List of shipwrecks: 29 May 2000
Ship	State	Description
Nordfrakt	Norway	The cargo ship collided with the container ship Hyundai Emperor (United Kingdom) and sank off Lisbon, Portugal (38°37′N 9°41′W). Her six crew were reported missing.
Victory Reefer	Honduras	The refrigerated cargo ship ran aground at Harper. She was a total loss.

=== 30 May ===
List of shipwrecks: 30 May 2000
Ship	State	Description
Trylam No.7	Panama	The fishing vessel foundered in the Atlantic Ocean 34°29′15″S 48°24′05″W). Her nineteen crew were rescued.

== June ==
=== 2 June ===
List of shipwrecks: 2 June 2000
Ship	State	Description
Hai Rong	China	the cargo ship collided with Joint Miriam (Flag unknown) and sank in the Yellow Sea (38°04′N 122°23′E). Her crew were rescued.

=== 3 June ===
List of shipwrecks: 3 June 2000
Ship	State	Description
Spring Breeze	Saint Vincent and the Grenadines	The cargo ship foundered in the Indian Ocean (6°11′N 93°28′E). Her 23 crew were rescued.

=== 5 June ===
List of shipwrecks: 5 June 2000
Ship	State	Description
Swordsman I	United States	The fishing vessel ran agroun on the Pearl and Hermes Atoll (27°50′N 175°50′W). She was subsequently refloated and scuttled.

=== 6 June ===
List of shipwrecks: 6 June 2000
Ship	State	Description
Fazak-i	Turkey	The cargo ship capsized and sank 16 nautical miles (30 km) off Karasu. Her eleven crew were rescued.
Felipe Xicotencatl	Mexican Navy	The minesweeper was sunk off the island of Cozumel for use as an artificial reef.
Stanegarth	United Kingdom	The tugboat was sunk in Stoney Cove in Leicestershire, England, to serve as a recreational dive site.
Zenitas	Honduras	The cargo ship capsized and sank off Tallinn, Estonia. One of her seven crew was reported missing.

=== 8 June ===
List of shipwrecks: 8 June 2000
Ship	State	Description
Peter	Malta	the cargo ship collided with the container ship Adeline Delmas (Bahamas) and sank off Owendo, Gabon. Her crew were rescued.

=== 12 June ===
List of shipwrecks: 12 June 2000
Ship	State	Description
Ventura	Saint Vincent and the Grenadines	The tanker broke in two 18 nautical miles (33 km) off Dondra Head, Sri Lanka. The stern section came ashore at "Raj Bhavan" on 3 July.

=== 14 June ===
List of shipwrecks: 14 June 2000
Ship	State	Description
USS Buchanan	United States Navy	USS Buchanan sinking Remaining afloat after being hit by three AGM-114 Hellfire air-to-surface missiles, three Harpoon anti-ship missiles, and a 2,400-pound (1,100 kg) laser-guided bomb while in use as a target the previous day, the decommissioned Charles F. Adams-class guided-missile destroyer was scuttled in the Pacific Ocean off Hawaii by the detonation of 200 lb (91 kg) of explosives that had been placed aboard her.

=== 15 June ===
List of shipwrecks: 15 June 2000
Ship	State	Description
Aleutian	United States	The 31-foot (9.4 m) salmon-fishing vessel sprang a leak, ran aground, and was lost at the mouth of the Naknek River on the coast of Alaska. The fishing vessel Sockeye (United States) rescued her entire crew of four.

=== 16 June ===
List of shipwrecks: 16 June 2000
Ship	State	Description
USNS General Hugh J. Gaffey	United States Navy	The retired Admiral W. S. Benson-class troop transport was sunk as a missile target in the Pacific Ocean at 23°35′01.0″N 159°50′00.2″W.
Madu Seguro	Indonesia	The cargo ship was driven ashore on Wowoni Island. Her 25 crew were rescued. She was a total loss.

=== 17 June ===
List of shipwrecks: 17 June 2000
Ship	State	Description
USS Worden	United States Navy	The decommissioned Leahy-class guided-missile cruiser was sunk as a target in the Pacific Ocean northwest of Kauai, Hawaii.

=== 20 June ===
List of shipwrecks: 20 June 2000
Ship	State	Description
Linkuva	Lithuania	Hurricane Carlotta: The cargo ship sank with the loss of all 18 crew.

=== 21 June ===
List of shipwrecks: 22 June 2000
Ship	State	Description
Linkuva	Belize	Hurricane Carlotta: The refrigerated cargo ship ws presumed to have foundered 220 nautical miles (410 km) south west of Acapulco, Mexico (15°03′N 103°29′W). Her eighteen crew were posted missing.

=== 22 June ===
List of shipwrecks: 22 June 2000
Ship	State	Description
No News	United States	While headed up the Whiting River in Southeast Alaska bound for Crescent Lake (58.209446°N 133.358887°W), the 20-foot (6.1 m) boat capsized and was lost. A United States Coast Guard helicopter rescued both people who had been aboard.

=== 23 June ===
List of shipwrecks: 23 June 2000
Ship	State	Description
Treasure	Panama	The vessel was carrying a load of iron ore when it sank off South Africa. The resulting oil spill caused a threat to the nearby population of African penguins.

=== 25 June ===
List of shipwrecks: 25 June 2000
Ship	State	Description
Orient Pearl	Panama	The cargo ship collided with Showa Maru No.5 (Japan) and sank in the Sea of Japan off Mutsure Island Her thirteen crew were rescued. She was subsequently refloated and scrapped at Wakamatsu.

=== 26 June ===
List of shipwrecks: 26 June 2000
Ship	State	Description
Mercs Uhana	Sri Lanka	The cargo ship was rammed by a fishing boat operated by Tamil Tiger rebels 48 nautical miles (89 km) off Point Pedro. She caught fire and sank. Twenty-one of her 28 crew were rescued. The rest were reported missing.

=== 29 June ===
List of shipwrecks: 29 June 2000
Ship	State	Description
Cahaya Bahari	Indonesia	The ferry sank off the Molucca Islands with the loss of almost all on board, estimated at up to 500 people. There were ten survivors.
Jeanne Marie	United States	The 30-foot (9.1 m) gillnet salmon-fishing vessel sank in Nushagak Bay 10 to 15 nautical miles (19 to 28 km; 12 to 17 mi) south of Ekuk, Alaska. The fishing vessel Norquest (United States) rescued her crew of two.

== July ==
=== 1 July ===
List of shipwrecks: 1 July 2000
Ship	State	Description
Odysseas	Tanzania	The fishing vessel capsized in Shugu Bay and was presumed to have foundered. Thirteen people were reported missing.

=== 2 July ===
List of shipwrecks: 2 July 2000
Ship	State	Description
Yong Fa	China	The cargo ship collided with the fish carrier Moon Chang No.205 (China) and ran aground off Yosu, South Korea (33°55′N 127°42′E). She broke into four on 16 September during Typhoon Saomai.

=== 8 July ===
List of shipwrecks: 8 July 2000
Ship	State	Description
Trang An	Vietnam	The cargo ship foundered in the East China Sea (29°11′N 122°29′E).

=== 12 July ===
List of shipwrecks: 13 July 2000
Ship	State	Description
Karapiperis 8	Greece	The tug foundered in the Mediterranean Sea (37°58′N 23°32′E). Her four crew were rescued.

=== 13 July ===
List of shipwrecks: 13 July 2000
Ship	State	Description
Force Five	United States	The 32-foot (9.8 m) salmon-fishing vessel was destroyed near Port Moller (55°59′30″N 160°34′30″W), Alaska, by a fire that started in her engine room. Her crew of two survived.

=== 14 July ===
List of shipwrecks: 14 July 2000
Ship	State	Description
Brave Master	Saint Vincent and the Grenadines	The bulk carrier suffered an engine breakdown. She was towed to Piraeus, Greece, where she was declared a constructive total loss. She arrived at Alang, India for scrapping on 28 December.

=== 17 July ===
List of shipwrecks: 17 July 2000
Ship	State	Description
Kemar	United States	The 32-foot (9.8 m) salmon-fishing vessel was destroyed near Etolin Point (58°40′05″N 159°19′45″W) on the Bristol Bay coast of Alaska by a fire that started when her engine manifold overheated.

=== 18 July ===
List of shipwrecks: 18 July 2000
Ship	State	Description
Gaye	São Tomé and Príncipe	The cargo ship foundered in the Mediterranean Sea.

=== 19 July ===
List of shipwrecks: 19 July 2000
Ship	State	Description
Prime Value	Panama	The cargo ship rang aground and sank in the Hooghly River at Haldia, India. Seven of her crew were rescued, fifteen were reported missing.
Sulteng I	Indonesia	The cargo ship broke in two and sank 75 nautical miles (139 km) north west of Christmas Island. Her 24 crew were rescued.

=== 21 July ===
List of shipwrecks: 21 July 2000
Ship	State	Description
Spirit of Kwantlen	United States	During a voyage from Sitka, Alaska, to Victoria, British Columbia, Canada, the 35-foot (10.7 m) sailboat sank during a storm approximately 60 nautical miles (110 km; 69 mi) south of Sitka. A United States Coast Guard helicopter rescued all three people on board.

=== 22 July ===
List of shipwrecks: 22 July 2000
Ship	State	Description
Channel Surfer	United States	The 32-foot (9.8 m) gillnet salmon-fishing vessel burned and sank in the Shelikof Strait near Karluk, Alaska, after a fire broke out in her engine room.

=== 28 July ===
List of shipwrecks: 28 July 2000
Ship	State	Description
Ritas	Cyprus	The tank ship arrived at Table Bay with boiler problems. Declared a constructive total loss, she was beached at Alang, India on 27 November for scrapping.

== August ==
=== 1 August ===
List of shipwrecks: 1 August 2000
Ship	State	Description
Hasat	Turkey	The cargo ship exploded, caught fire and sank in the Mediterranean Sea off Sicily, Italy (36°26′N 18°40′E). Her 22 crew were rescued.
Valea Asre	Saint Vincent and the Grenadines	The cargo ship foundered in the Indian Ocean (15°45′N 52°58′E). Two of her crew were reported missing.

=== 2 August ===
List of shipwrecks: 2 August 2000
Ship	State	Description
Global Mariner	United Kingdom	The cargo ship collided with Atlantic Crusader (Cyprus) and sank in the Orinoco. All on board were rescued.

=== 5 August ===
List of shipwrecks: 5 August 2000
Ship	State	Description
Tradition	United States	The 42-foot (12.8 m) salmon-fishing vessel was destroyed at King Cove, Alaska, by a fire that broke out in her engine room. Her crew of four escaped in a skiff and survived.

=== 8 August ===
List of shipwrecks: 8 August 2000
Ship	State	Description
Wooyang Blue	South Korea	The cargo ship collided with Jin Ju (China) and sank in the East China Sea (approximately 36°24′N 129°50′E). Her twelve crew were rescued.

=== 12 August ===
List of shipwrecks: 12 August 2000
Ship	State	Description
Double Brave	Saint Vincent and the Grenadines	The cargo ship collided with a barge and sank at the mouth of the Sarawak River. Her 21 crew were rescued.
Kursk	Russian Navy	The Oscar II-class submarine suffered an on-board explosion and sank in the Barents Sea at 69°40′N 37°35′E with the loss of all 118 crew.

=== 13 August ===
List of shipwrecks: 13 August 2000
Ship	State	Description
San Juan Ferry	Philippines	The ro-ro ferry suffered and explosion in her engine room and caught fire. She sank in Lilouan Bay the next day.

=== 16 August ===
List of shipwrecks: 16 August 2000
Ship	State	Description
Ms. Tracie	United States	The 60-foot (18.3 m) salmon-fishing vessel sank off Cedar Point (55°05′50″N 131°36′25″W) at Metlakatla, Alaska. Her crew of six abandoned ship in a skiff and was rescued by the fishing vessel Island Dancer (United States).

=== 17 August ===
List of shipwrecks: 19 August 2000
Ship	State	Description
Bangulang	Thailand	Tropical Storm Kaemi: The cargo ship foundered in the South China Sea off the Spratly Islands, Twelve of her 23 crew were rescued, the rest were reported missing.
Gurgen 2	Turkey	The ro-ro ship caught fire at Trabzon. She was towed out of port but sank during firefighting operations. Twelve of her crew were rescued, one was reported missing.

=== 19 August ===
List of shipwrecks: 19 August 2000
Ship	State	Description
San Martin	United States	The 48-foot (14.6 m) salmon-fishing vessel was destroyed at Polk Island southwest of Ketchikan in Southeast Alaska by a fire that began in her engine room. Her entire crew of four survived.

=== 21 August ===
List of shipwrecks: 21 August 2000
Ship	State	Description
Frisco	United States	The 50-foot (15.2 m) salmon-fishing vessel sank off South Craig Point (56°23′20″N 132°37′30″W) on the coast of Zarembo Island in the Alexander Archipelago in Southeast Alaska. Her crew of four abandoned ship in her seine skiff and survived.
John Oliver	Philippines	The cargo liner foundered 5 nautical miles (9.3 km) off Green Island, Taiwan. All on board were rescued.

=== 22 August ===
List of shipwrecks: 22 August 2000
Ship	State	Description
Flying Dolphin V	Greece	The passenger ship caught fire off Aegina Island. She was towed in to Piraeus. All on board were rescued. She was declared a total loss.

=== 25 August ===
List of shipwrecks: 25 August 2000
Ship	State	Description
Aleut Princess	United States	The 70-foot (21.3 m) salmon tender was destroyed by fire at Angoon, Alaska, without loss of life.
Tamora	United States	The 36-foot (11.0 m) salmon troller dragged her anchor, ran aground, capsized, and was lost in Kalinin Bay (57°20′N 135°47′W) in Southeast Alaska. The only person on board survived.

=== 28 August ===
List of shipwrecks: 28 August 2000
Ship	State	Description
Olivus	United States	The 35-foot (10.7 m) salmon troller sank in dense fog in Helm Bay (55°36′N 131°55′W) in Southeast Alaska, northwest of Ketchikan, Alaska, with the loss of one life. There was one survivor.

=== 29 August ===
List of shipwrecks: 29 August 2000
Ship	State	Description
Nordland	Antigua and Barbuda	The cargo ship ran aground at Kithira, Greece. There was no crew injured on ship. The stern section of the ship is completely sank & while the bow section is still in wrecksite. She was voyage from Saint John, Canada, to Turkey with cargo load of scrap metal.

=== August ===
List of shipwrecks: Unknown date in August 2000
Ship	State	Description
Atlasovo	Russia	The fishing vessel ran aground south of Karaginsky Island and subsequently sank. Her crew were rescued.

== September ==
=== 1 September ===
List of shipwrecks: 8 September 2000
Ship	State	Description
Eurobulker X	Cambodia	The bulk carrier broke in two at Lefkandi, Greece. She had sunk by 3 September with the loss of a crew member.

=== 8 September ===
List of shipwrecks: 8 September 2000
Ship	State	Description
Eurobulker IV	Saint Vincent and the Grenadines	The bulk carrier was driven onto rocks at Portovesme, Sardinia, Italy (39°13′00″N 8°20′02″E). Her crew were rescued. She broke in two and sank on 3 October.

=== 10 September ===
List of shipwrecks: 10 September 2000
Ship	State	Description
Bieszczady	Poland	The Opal-class sailing yacht of the ZHP Naval Training Center in Gdynia, Poland, was sunk in a collision with the liquefied natural gas carrier Lady Elena (flag unknown) near the northwestern shore of Denmark, with the loss of seven crew members. There was one survivor.

=== 11 September ===
List of shipwrecks: 11 September 2000
Ship	State	Description
Ryuho Maru No.5	Japan	The fishing vessel capsized and sank 30 nautical miles (56 km) south of Urakawa (41°53′N 142°47′E). Her fourteen crew were reported missing.

=== 12 September ===
List of shipwrecks: 12 September 2000
Ship	State	Description
USS La Moure County	United States Navy	View of forward deck and bow of USS La Moure County while she was aground The Newport-class tank landing ship ran aground on the coast of Chile in Caleta Cifuncho Bay. She was salvaged but deemed to have been damaged beyond economical repair and was later sunk as a target ship.
Patrick J. McHugh	United States	The retired 85-foot (25.9 m) tug was scuttled as an artificial reef in the North Atlantic Ocean 2 nautical miles (3.7 km; 2.3 mi) off Mantoloking, New Jersey, in 80 feet (24 m) of water at 40°02.473′N 073°59.599′W.

=== 15 September ===
List of shipwrecks: 15 September 2000
Ship	State	Description
Chios Charm	Panama	The bulk carrier collided with a lock in the Saint Lawrence Seaway. She was declared a constructive total loss. She arrived at Alang, India for scrapping on 16 December.

=== 16 September ===
List of shipwrecks: 16 September 2000
Ship	State	Description
Bintang Biru	Indonesia	Typhoon Saomai: The bulk carrier was driven onto rocks off Gaduko Island and broke in tow. Her 29 crew were rescued. Removal of the wreck commenced on 15 October.
Il Shin	South Korea	Typhoon Saomai: The bulk carrier was driven onto rocks off Sodogo Island (35°04′07″N 128°43′00″E). She was declared a compromised total loss. Removal of the wreck commenced on 10 November.

=== 18 September ===
List of shipwrecks: 18 September 2000
Ship	State	Description
Madona	Liberia	The bulk carrier foundered 200 nautical miles (370 km) north of the Cocos Islands (9°37′S 99°17′E). Her 25 crew were rescued by Danny F II (Saint Vincent and the Grenadines).

=== 23 September ===
List of shipwrecks: 23 September 2000
Ship	State	Description
Polanco	Portugal	the cargo ship caught fire and sank in the Atlantic Ocean 24 nautical miles (44 km) off Punta de Estaca de Bares (43°26′N 7°07′W). Her six crew were rescued.

=== 25 September ===
List of shipwrecks: 25 September 2000
Ship	State	Description
Maju Karsa Perdana	Indonesia	The cargo ship foundered off Bangka Island (12°16′S 106°18′E). One of her eighteen crew was reported missing.

=== 26 September ===
List of shipwrecks: 26 September 2000
Ship	State	Description
Express Samina	Greece	The roll-on/roll-off passenger ferry hit rocks off the island of Paros and subsequently sank 34°05′N 25°06′E). Ninety-one of the 534 people on board died.

=== 29 September ===
List of shipwrecks: 29 September 2000
Ship	State	Description
Geta	Bahamas	The cargo ship collided with Graneborg (Germany) in the Baltic Sea 10 nautical miles (19 km) south of the Utklippan Lighthouse, Sweden. Her six crew were rescued; three by Graneborg. Geta sank later that day (55°56′N 15°44′E).
Hoei Maru No.10	Japan	The dredger ran aground on the Nakanose Reef, in Tokyo Bay. She subsequently sank.

=== Unknown date ===
List of shipwrecks: Unknown date in September 2000
Ship	State	Description
Ernestina II	Peru	The fishing vessel foundered north of Callao.

== October ==
=== 1 October ===
List of shipwrecks: 1 October 2000
Ship	State	Description
An Oriant	France	The fishing vessel foundered in the Atlantic Ocean 68 nautical miles (126 km) off Kerry Head, County Kerry, Ireland. Three of her crew were rescued, eight were reported missing.

=== 3 October ===
List of shipwrecks: 3 October 2000
Ship	State	Description
Alejandra	Saint Vincent and the Grenadines	The cargo ship foundered in the Atlantic Ocean (17°50′N 68°40′W). Her fourteen crew were rescued by Longavi (Liberia).
Arosa	United Kingdom	The fishing vessel ran aground on the Skerd Rocks, County Galway, Ireland. She later broke up and sank. A crew member was rescued, seven died and five were reported missing.
Canakkale D.	Turkey	The cargo ship foundered 2 nautical miles (3.7 km) off Aveiro, Portugal. Her nine crew were rescued.
Keta V	Canada	The tug ran aground near Liverpool, Nova Scotia. Her seven crew were rescued. She sank on 7 October (44°02′38″N 64°39′39″W).
Natuna Sea	Panama	The tanker ran aground in the Singapore Strait and was damaged, spilling 7,000 tonnes of oil. She was refloated on 12 October.

=== 8 October ===
List of shipwrecks: 8 October 2000
Ship	State	Description
Yoshiumi	Panama	the cargo ship caught fire 130 nautical miles (240 km) off Muroto Point, Japan. Her sixteen crew were rescued. She was towed in to Setoda, where she was declared a total loss.

=== 10 October ===
List of shipwrecks: 10 October 2000
Ship	State	Description
Michael	Greece	The tanker suffered engine damage 170 nautical miles (310 km) north west of Colombo, Sri Lanka. She was towed to Galle, Sri Lanka. Declared a constructive total loss, she was scrapped at Chittagong, Bangladesh.

=== 16 October ===
List of shipwrecks: 16 October 2000
Ship	State	Description
Jubilant	Panama	The cargo ship ran aground in the Saugor Roads. She was a total loss.

=== 18 October ===
List of shipwrecks: 18 October 2000
Ship	State	Description
ROCS Shou Shan	Republic of China Navy	The decommissioned Crosley-class high-speed transport was sunk as a target.

=== 19 October ===
List of shipwrecks: 19 October 2000
Ship	State	Description
Tayfun-1	Russia	The fishing vessel foundered off the Kuril Islands. Her crew were rescued.

=== 20 October ===
List of shipwrecks: 20 October 2000
Ship	State	Description
YC-1479	United States Navy	The decommissioned 110-foot (34 m) open lighter was scuttled as an artificial reef in the North Atlantic Ocean off the coast of Delaware at 38°40.540′N 074°43.957′W.

=== 21 October ===
List of shipwrecks: 21 October 2000
Ship	State	Description
Belofin-1	Panama	The ocean liner sprang a leak and sank 52 nautical miles (96 km) off Robben Island, South Africa whilst under tow to shipbreakers. Her crew were rescued.

=== 23 October ===
List of shipwrecks: 23 October 2000
Ship	State	Description
Mary Star of the Sea	Panama	The cargo ship foundered off Miami Beach, Florida, United States. Her crew were rescued.

=== 26 October ===
List of shipwrecks: 26 October 2000
Ship	State	Description
Bonea	Spain	The offshore supply vessel sank in the Atlantic Ocean (6°30′N 22°10′W). Her crew were rescued.

=== 27 October ===
List of shipwrecks: 27 October 2000
Ship	State	Description
Bodryy	Russia	The tug foundered in the Sea of Okhotsk off Verkhoturovo Island. Three of her crew died, the rest were reported missing.

=== 31 October ===
List of shipwrecks: 31 October 2000
Ship	State	Description
Ievoli Sun	Italy	The chemical tanker sank in the English Channel (49°52′N 2°24′W) off the Casquets. All fourteen crew were rescued by a Marine Nationale helicopter.

=== Unknown date ===
List of shipwrecks: Unknown date in October 2000
Ship	State	Description
Karganik	Russia	The fishing vessel ran aground on the north of Onekotan Island with the loss of a crew member.
SCHS-0777	Ukraine	The fishing vessel foundered in the Black Sea. Her crew were rescued.
Sikhote-Alin	Russia	The fishing vessel ran aground near Svetlaya. She was abandoned as a total loss.

== November ==
=== 1 November ===
List of shipwrecks: 1 November 2000
Ship	State	Description
Captain Tony-Peter	United States	The fishing vessel sprang a leak 8 nautical miles (15 km) north east of Galveston, Texas and was abandoned by her three crew. She was presumed to have foundered.
Manila Spirit	Panama	Typhoon Xangsane: The bulk carrier was driven onto rocks at Juifang, Taiwan (25°04′04″N 121°53′01″E) and subsequently sank. One person was rescued, 23 people were reported missing.

=== 2 November ===
List of shipwrecks: 2 November 2000
Ship	State	Description
Towa	Panama	The tanker foundered in the Indian Ocean (24°58′05″N 119°18′04″E). Her crew were rescued.

=== 4 November ===
List of shipwrecks: 4 November 2000
Ship	State	Description
Ballena	United States	The Channel Islands National Marine Sanctuary research vessel capsized when a 20-foot (6.1 m) rogue wave struck her in the Pacific Ocean near Point Conception off Santa Barbara, California. Two United States Geological Survey employees briefly were trapped inside the overturned vessel but escaped, and all three people aboard survived. Ballena broke apart in the waves against the rocky shore and was a total loss.
Esha Ness	United Kingdom	The fishing vessel foundered in the North Sea 60 nautical miles (110 km) south east of Sumburgh, Shetland Islands. Her five crew were rescued by the fishing vessel Evening Star (United Kingdom).

== =5 November ==
List of shipwrecks: 6 November 2000
Ship	State	Description
Peter Madsen	Denmark	The dredger sank in the Baltic Sea (54°30′02″N 12°05′02″E). Her three crew were rescued. She was subsequently refloated and taken in to Gedser, where she arrived on 16 November.

=== 6 November ===
List of shipwrecks: 6 November 2000
Ship	State	Description
Cheramie Bo-Truc No.26	United States	The offshore supply vessel foundered 78 nautical miles (144 km) south of Marsh Island, Washington (22°06′N 91°40′W). Four of her crew were rescued, two were reported missing.
Ryazan	Russia	The cargo ship in the Bering Sea off Cape Navarin (62°24′N 178°25′E). Her crew were rescued.

=== 8 November ===
List of shipwrecks: 8 November 2000
Ship	State	Description
Asahi Hope	Panama	The cargo ship was driven ashore at shakhtyorsk, Russia. Her crew were rescued. She was declared a total loss.

=== 10 November ===
List of shipwrecks: 10 November 2000
Ship	State	Description
Elena	Russia	The cargo ship foundered in the Caspian Sea off Bandar-e Anzali, Iran. Her fourteen crew were rescued.

=== 11 November ===
List of shipwrecks: 11 November 2000
Ship	State	Description
Taboti	Greece	The tanker exploded, capsized and sank off Tin Can Island, Tonga. Ten of her crew were rescued; a number were reported missing.

=== 12 November ===
List of shipwrecks: 12 November 2000
Ship	State	Description
Marine Dove	Panama	The cargo ship struck a reef in the South China Sea. She sank the next day 100 nautical miles (190 km) off the Spratly Islands the next day. Her crew were rescued.

=== 15 November ===
List of shipwrecks: 15 November 2000
Ship	State	Description
Chukotskiy Bereg	Russia	The fishing vessel was driven ashore on Pratas Island, Taiwan (20°37′N 116°53′E). Salvage was subsequently abandoned and she was a total loss.
Nordlandia	Russia	The refrigerated cargo ship collided with EW Mckinley (Panama) at Kronstadt. She capsized and sank with the loss of a crew member.

=== 18 November ===
List of shipwrecks: 18 November 2000
Ship	State	Description
Fritzi K.	United States	The tug foundered 50 nautical miles (93 km) south east of Cameron, Louisiana. Her six crew were rescued.

=== 20 November ===
List of shipwrecks: 20 November 2000
Ship	State	Description
Tadoussac	Canada	The lake freighter ran aground at Sarnia, Ontario while preparing to unload her cargo. The ship was freed the following day.

=== 22 November ===
List of shipwrecks: 22 November 2000
Ship	State	Description
Union Star 17	Sierra Leone	The cargo ship was driven ashore at Sri Turuth, Malaysia. She was refloated on 13 December.

=== 24 November ===
List of shipwrecks: 24 November 2000
Ship	State	Description
City of Hydra	Greece	The cruise ship sank in Eleusis Bay.

=== 26 November ===
List of shipwrecks: 29 November 2000
Ship	State	Description
Rui Xiang	Saint Vincent and the Grenadines	The cargo ship foundered in the South China Sea (19°44′N 112°11′E). Her crew were rescued.

=== 29 November ===
List of shipwrecks: 29 November 2000
Ship	State	Description
Fox River	United States	The 93-gross register ton, 100.3-foot (30.6 m) landing craft burned on the south-central coast of Alaska during a voyage to Shuyak Island. A United States Coast Guard helicopter rescued the two men on board.

=== 30 November ===
List of shipwrecks: 30 November 2000
Ship	State	Description
Zorrozaurre	United Kingdom	The fishing vessel was driven ashore and wrecked near Roancarrigmore, County Galway, Ireland. Her crew were rescued.

=== Unknown date ===
List of shipwrecks: Unknown date in November 2000
Ship	State	Description
Ciudad Arucas	Flag unknown	The fishing vessel foundered.

== December ==
=== 2 December ===
List of shipwrecks: 2 December 2000
Ship	State	Description
Sky Prima	Cambodia	The cargo ship foundered in the Sea of Japan (39°55′N 131°03′E). Her seventeen crew were rescued.

=== 3 December ===
List of shipwrecks: 3 December 2000
Ship	State	Description
Southern Queen	Antigua and Barbuda	The cargo ship caught fire at Chittagong, Bangladesh. Her fourteen crew were evacuated and she was scuttled the next day.

=== 9 December ===
List of shipwrecks: 9 December 2000
Ship	State	Description
ROCS Chen Hai	Republic of China Navy	The decommissioned Casa Grande-class dock landing ship was sunk as an artificial reef.

=== 12 December ===
List of shipwrecks: 12 December 2000
Ship	State	Description
Lagik	Antigua and Barbuda	The cargo ship ran aground in the River Nene at Sutton Bridge, Lincolnshire, United Kingdom and was abandoned by her seven crew. Declared a total loss, she was cut into three to remove her.

=== 13 December ===
List of shipwrecks: 13 December 2000
Ship	State	Description
Lagik	Antigua and Barbuda	The ship became wedged across the River Nene at Sutton Bridge, Lincolnshire, United Kingdom. She subsequently broke in two and was declared a constructive total loss.

=== 14 December ===
List of shipwrecks: 14 December 2000
Ship	State	Description
Steinfalk	Norway	The cargo ship was presumed to have foundered in the North Sea (60°29′N 4°49′E). Three of her crew were reported missing.

=== 15 December ===
List of shipwrecks: 15 December 2000
Ship	State	Description
Corvo	Portugal	The cargo ship was driven ashore on Graciosa Island, Azores. Her crew were rescued by a Portuguese Navy frigate. She broke in two on 19 December. Salvage was abandoed on 24 December and she was declared a total loss.

=== 16 December ===
List of shipwrecks: 16 December 2000
Ship	State	Description
Union Star 17	Sierra Leone	The cargo ship foundered 6 nautical miles (11 km) off Kuala Besut, Malaysia. Her crew survived.

=== 17 December ===
List of shipwrecks: 17 December 2000
Ship	State	Description
SeaBreeze	Panama	The cruise liner sank in the Atlantic Ocean 425 nautical miles (787 km) off the coast of Virginia. All 34 crew were rescued. Barratry was suspected in the loss of the vessel.

=== 18 December ===
List of shipwrecks: 18 December 2000
Ship	State	Description
HMNZS Waikato	Royal New Zealand Navy	The decommissioned Leander-class frigate was sunk off Tutukaka, New Zealand, to form an artificial reef.

=== 23 December ===
List of shipwrecks: 23 December 2000
Ship	State	Description
Anita	Belize	The cargo ship foundered 45 nautical miles (83 km) south east of Miami, Florida, United States. One of her nine crew died, the rest were reported missing.
Janra	Germany	Janra collided with an iron lighthouse about 20 miles off the Aland Islands, Finland. Recovery was by parbucking.

=== 25 December ===
List of shipwrecks: 25 December 2000
Ship	State	Description
John R	Cyprus	The cargo ship ran aground at Rebbenesøya, Norway. All 26 crew were rescued. The grounded ship broke in two on 2 January 2001, with the bow section sinking and the stern remaining aground. The bow section was raised in April 2001 and was towed away for scrapping, while the stern broke apart and sank.

=== 26 December ===
List of shipwrecks: 26 December 2000
Ship	State	Description
Coral Bulker	Hong Kong	The bulk carrier was driven on to rocks at Viana do Castelo, Spain and was abandoned by her crew. She was a total loss.

=== 28 December ===
List of shipwrecks: 28 December 2000
Ship	State	Description
Jia Ding Guan	China	The cargo ship was abandoned by her crew in the Indian Ocean. Her 27 crew were rescued by Dolphin Hope (Flag unknown). Jia Ding Guan foundered the next day (20°49′N 113°44′E).

=== Unknown date ===
List of shipwrecks: Unknown date in December 2000
Ship	State	Description
Asean Liberty	Singapore	The cargo ship was driven ashore on the coast of Myanmar between 24 and 30 December and was abandoned by her crew. She was a total loss.
Mariz e Barros	Brazilian Navy	The decommissioned Gearing-class destroyer was sunk as a target.
Team Philips		The sailing catamaran broke up and sank in the Atlantic Ocean during a storm.

== Unknown date ==
List of shipwrecks: Unknown date in 2000
Ship	State	Description
Georgios I	Greece	The cargo ship was driven ashore west of Lindos, Greece before June 2000. She was a total loss.
Hay Tan	Republic of China Navy	The 389-foot (119 m), concrete-hulled floating drydock was scuttled sometime in 2000.
"MDB"	United Kingdom	The fishing vessel sank from a broke pipe sometime in 2000.
SLNS P-482	Sri Lanka Navy	Sri Lankan Civil War: The patrol boat was sunk by the Liberation Tigers of Tamil Eelam sometime in 2000.
SLNS Ranakami	Sri Lanka Navy	Sri Lankan Civil War: The patrol boat was sunk by the Liberation Tigers of Tamil Eelam sometime in 2000.
Taioma	New Zealand	The tug was sunk in the Bay of Plenty for use as a dive wreck.
