= Accommodation address =

"Accommodation address" is a term used mostly in the United Kingdom to denote a location where mail can be delivered in the name of a person or business for retrieval. The service is similar to poste restante and post office boxes, but is generally supplied by a private company, or even an individual. The degree of service can range from full secretarial and telephone answering, to a simple mail drop. Small businesses use accommodation addresses when they have no fixed place of business, and do not wish to use a post office box, a proper address giving an air of respectability.

Accommodation addresses are occasionally used to have goods delivered that have been paid for through credit card fraud.

== See also ==
- Serviced office
- Commercial mail receiving agency - US equivalent
