= MV Vinalines Queen =

Sunken bulk carrier

- Vinalines Queen as spotted in the New York Harbor as in March 2011, the same year that it sank.

History
- Name: Vinalines Queen
- Operator: Vinalines
- Port of registry: Vietnam
- Launched: 2005
- Identification: Call sign: XVHG; IMO number: 9290907
- Fate: Capsized and sunk, 25 December 2011

General characteristics
- Type: Bulk carrier
- Tonnage: 31,247 GT; 56,040 DWT
- Length: 190 m (623 ft 4 in)
- Beam: 32 m (105 ft 0 in)
- Crew: 23

MV Vinalines Queen was a bulk carrier of the Vietnam National Shipping Lines, or Vinalines. On its last voyage the ship was travelling from Indonesia to China with more than 54,000 tonnes of nickel ore. The ship disappeared on 25 December 2011 and its fate was initially unknown. On 30 December 2011 a single survivor of its 23-member crew, was found by the British ship London Courage, after floating with a rescue vest for five days. He reported that the ship sank quickly in the early hours of the morning after capsizing to the left. It sank after passing the island of Luzon in very bad weather conditions in waters up to 5,000 metres (16,000 ft) deep.

The probable cause for the sinking was liquefaction of her nickel ore cargo resulting in the shifting of cargo in the holds, which destabilised the vessel causing her to sink.
