= Francesco Schettino =

Italian sea captain responsible for the 2012 Costa Concordia disaster

- Born: 14 November 1960 (age 66); Castellammare di Stabia, Italy
- Occupation: Former shipmaster
- Employer: Costa Crociere (2002–2012)
- Known for: Captain of Costa Concordia (2006–2012)
- Spouse: Fabiola Russo
- Children: 1
- Criminal charges: Manslaughter, causing a maritime disaster, abandoning ship with passengers still on board
- Penalty: 16 years in prison

Details
- Date apprehended: 12 May 2017 (9 years ago)

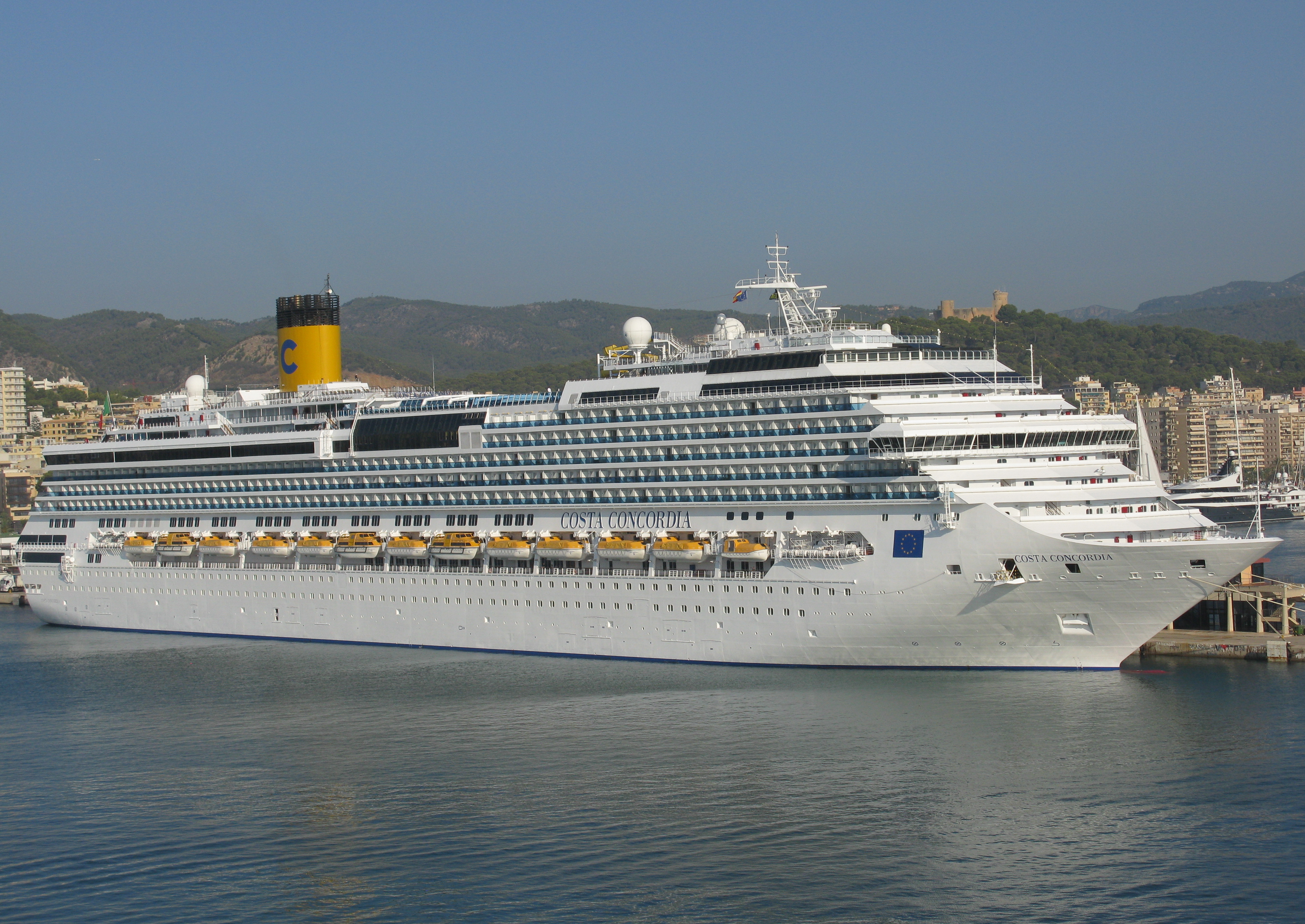
Costa Concordia, commanded by Captain Francesco Schettino at the time of grounding

Francesco Schettino (Italian pronunciation: [franˈtʃesko sketˈtiːno]; born 14 November 1960) is an Italian former shipmaster who commanded and abandoned the cruise ship Costa Concordia when the ship struck an underwater rock and capsized off the Italian island of Giglio on 13 January 2012. Thirty-two passengers and crew died in the incident. In 2015, he was sentenced to sixteen years in prison for multiple counts of manslaughter, causing a maritime disaster, and abandoning ship, and he began serving his sentence in 2017 after exhausting his appeals. He was released after nine and a half years, in 2026.

== Early life ==
Francesco Schettino was born in Castellammare di Stabia into a seafaring family based in Meta, Campania. He attended the nautical institute Nino Bixio in Piano di Sorrento.

== Career ==
On 16 April 2002, aged 41, Schettino was hired by Costa Crociere, a subsidiary of Carnival Corporation. He initially served as an officer in charge of security and was later promoted to second-in-command. In 2006, Schettino was promoted to captain and given command of the newly launched Costa Concordia.

In November 2008, while under his command, Costa Concordia suffered bow damage in Palermo when high winds pushed the ship against the dock; there were no injuries and repairs began soon afterward.

According to Costa, in 2010, while master of Costa Atlantica, Schettino allegedly damaged another Carnival Corporation ship, AIDAblu, while entering the port of Warnemünde, Germany, at excessive speed; AIDA Cruises later stated that the incident caused no damage.

In 2014, two years after the Costa Concordia disaster, he delivered a university seminar on panic management in Rome, an appearance that provoked strong controversy among politicians, survivors, and commentators.

In 2015, Schettino published a book, Le verità sommerse (transl. The submerged truths), in which he defended his conduct and portrayed himself as acting heroically. The book, controversially dedicated to the victims of the catastrophe, drew criticism from survivors and commentators who argued that he was attempting both to profit from the tragedy and to recast his public image.

=== Costa Concordia disaster ===
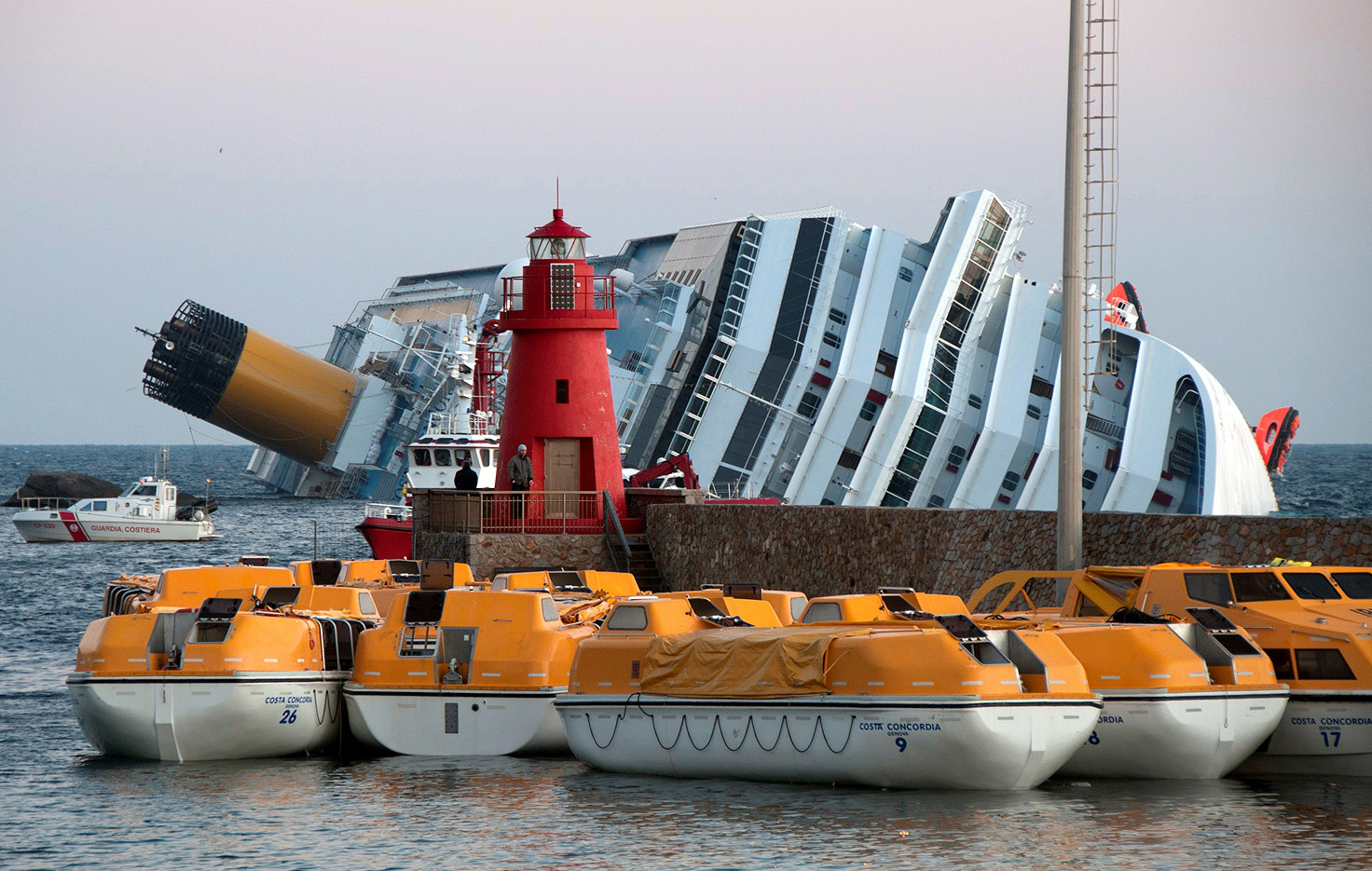
Schettino's actions during the Costa Concordia disaster resulted in a 16-year prison sentence for manslaughter.

Schettino was captain of Costa Concordia on 13 January 2012, when the ship attempted a sail-by salute off Giglio, a maneuver he had previously performed, including at Giglio itself. The ship struck a well-charted underwater rock, partially capsized and listed to starboard, leading to 32 deaths among passengers and crew. Media reports suggested that he was distracted by Moldovan dancer Domnica Cemortan, who was present on the bridge and later acknowledged both her presence and an affair with Schettino.

Schettino later stated that he brought the vessel close to shore to perform a sail-by salute intended both to honor local mariners and to give passengers a better view, claiming he was navigating largely by sight because he knew the route well. Costa Cruises later stated that he failed to follow the company’s authorized route for such sail-by maneuvers. Schettino publicly accepted some responsibility and asked for forgiveness when speaking about the victims.

In 2012, his lawyer Bruno Leporatti described Schettino’s post‑collision maneuvering as “brilliant”, arguing that his actions brought the vessel closer to shore and thereby saved lives. Ahead of Schettino’s testimony in December 2014, another lawyer, Domenico Pepe, said his client wished to “set the record straight” and “defend his honour”.

Schettino argued that the rock formation the ship struck was uncharted, that the helmsman had language difficulties, and that generator failures hindered the rescue. He also maintained that he left the ship only when it rolled and that he “fell” into a lifeboat.

A widely reported recorded conversation between Schettino and Gregorio de Falco, the on‑duty Italian Coast Guard commander, captured de Falco repeatedly ordering him to return to the ship, rejecting his explanation that he had accidentally ended up in a lifeboat and could not return because it was dark and the boat had stopped moving. During the exchange, de Falco’s exclamation, "Vada a bordo, cazzo!" (“Get back on board, for fuck’s sake!”), became emblematic of public outrage over Schettino’s conduct.

Giglio police officer Carlo Galli later recounted that he found Schettino onshore, offered him a dinghy to return to the ship, and observed that the captain’s clothes were dry despite his claim to have fallen into a lifeboat.

==== Treatment in media ====
Schettino was heavily criticized in international media coverage and was widely nicknamed "Captain Coward" and "Captain Calamity". Some commentators portrayed him as a daredevil prone to insubordination. Tabloid coverage sometimes described him as "Italy's most hated man". At the end of his trial in Grosseto, Schettino said that he had spent three years in what he called a "media meat grinder".

Some reporting and commentary focused on his personal style of command, suggesting a pattern of risk‑taking behavior and highlighting earlier allegations of close‑to‑shore approaches and unofficial "salutes".

Costa Cruises maintained communication with Schettino between the collision and the formal evacuation order, and some sources argued that these exchanges may have contributed to delays in the rescue response. Other reconstructions of events noted that Schettino did not contact Costa during the first fifteen minutes after impact, so any later conversations could not have prevented him from issuing a mayday or promptly ordering an evacuation. He was also reported to have downplayed the seriousness of the situation to the coast guard and to have directed passengers away from muster stations, further delaying evacuation.

Although there were early suspicions that Schettino might have been under the influence of drugs or alcohol, toxicology tests carried out the night of the disaster were negative.

==== Legal proceedings ====
After the incident, Schettino was placed in temporary custody by the prosecutor of Grosseto and moved to house arrest on 17 January 2012. On 5 July 2012 he was released from house arrest but ordered to reside in Meta di Sorrento.

Before the trial began, Costa chairman Pier Luigi Foschi publicly blamed the captain for deviating from the planned course and bringing the ship dangerously close to Giglio, and the company dismissed Schettino in 2012. Costa declined to fund his legal defence, and after a plea bargain with prosecutors the company joined the proceedings as a co‑plaintiff.

Schettino's trial was separated from that of five Costa employees:

- Roberto Ferrarini – the company's crisis director, later convicted of minimizing the scale of the disaster and delaying an adequate response
- Manrico Giampedroni – cabin service director
- Ciro Ano – first officer
- Jacob Rusli Bin – helmsman, the only non‑Italian defendant
- Silvia Coronica – third officer

All five entered plea bargains and received prison sentences ranging from 18 months to two years and ten months. A separate criminal investigation into Costa’s potential liability was closed when the company agreed to pay a fine of €1 million, although it remained exposed to civil damages.

==== Court of Grosseto trial ====
On 23 February 2013, prosecutors in Grosseto formally brought charges against Schettino. He was accused of multiple counts of manslaughter, causing a maritime accident, abandoning ship with passengers still on board, and failing to cooperate with rescue efforts. The trial was held in Grosseto’s Main Theater, which was converted into a courtroom to accommodate lawyers for approximately 250 co‑plaintiffs and around 400 scheduled witnesses.

While other defendants were able to negotiate plea bargains, a similar request by Schettino was denied. His legal team argued that he was being made a scapegoat and that responsibility should also extend to the helmsman, Costa’s shore‑side management, and the Italian coast guard. By the time he gave his first testimony on 2 December 2014, he was the only person still standing trial for manslaughter. Some survivors’ representatives similarly argued that systemic failures in ship design, safety procedures, and emergency equipment went beyond the captain’s individual actions.

In court, Schettino reiterated that the sail‑by salute was intended as a tribute to fellow seafarers and as a marketing gesture for passengers, and he denied that the maneuver was carried out to impress Cemortan, who had boarded as a non‑paying passenger and later confirmed their affair. He insisted that his actions after the impact saved many lives and claimed that some crew members misunderstood his orders. He and his defence also pointed to malfunctioning generators, flooding of several watertight compartments, and alleged technical problems as aggravating factors that contributed to the scale of the disaster.

Prosecutor Maria Navarro requested a 26‑year and three‑month prison sentence, broken down as fourteen years for multiple manslaughter, nine years for causing a shipwreck, three years for abandoning ship, and three months for failing to promptly inform the authorities. Navarro accused him of lying both in public interviews and during the proceedings. Fellow prosecutor Stefano Pizza emphasized that the long‑standing expectation that a captain be the last to leave a stricken vessel is both a cultural norm and a legal obligation intended to minimize casualties. Schettino’s lawyers denied the charges and reiterated their view that the disaster represented a collective failure in which the captain was unfairly singled out.

On 11 February 2015, after a 19‑month trial, Judge Giovanni Puliatti sentenced Schettino to sixteen years’ imprisonment and five years of interdiction from navigating. The term consisted of ten years for manslaughter, five years for causing the shipwreck, and one year for abandoning passengers, to be served consecutively.

==== Response to the verdict ====
Costa’s lawyer described the verdict as "balanced", but some survivors’ associations and commentators considered the sentence too lenient in light of the number of deaths. Other analyses argued that while Schettino bore primary criminal responsibility, he was also used as a scapegoat for wider failures in ship design, safety management, and emergency planning.

On 31 May 2016, an Italian appeals court upheld the original conviction and sentence. Schettino appealed further to Italy’s Supreme Court of Cassation, which confirmed the verdict on 12 May 2017. Following that ruling, he reported to Rome’s Rebibbia prison to begin serving his term.

In April 2025, approximately ten years after his conviction, Schettino withdrew a request for day‑release after reportedly failing to secure a suitable work placement required under Italian semi‑liberty rules.

== Personal life ==
He is married to Fabiola Russo, with whom he has one daughter.

On the night of the collision, 26‑year‑old Moldovan dancer Domnica Cemortan was present with Schettino on the bridge and later testified that the two were involved in an extramarital affair. Before beginning his prison sentence, Schettino lived in Meta in the Province of Naples.

== See also ==
- The captain goes down with the ship
- Yiannis Avranas
