= Costa Concordia disaster =

2012 cruise ship sinking off the Italian coast

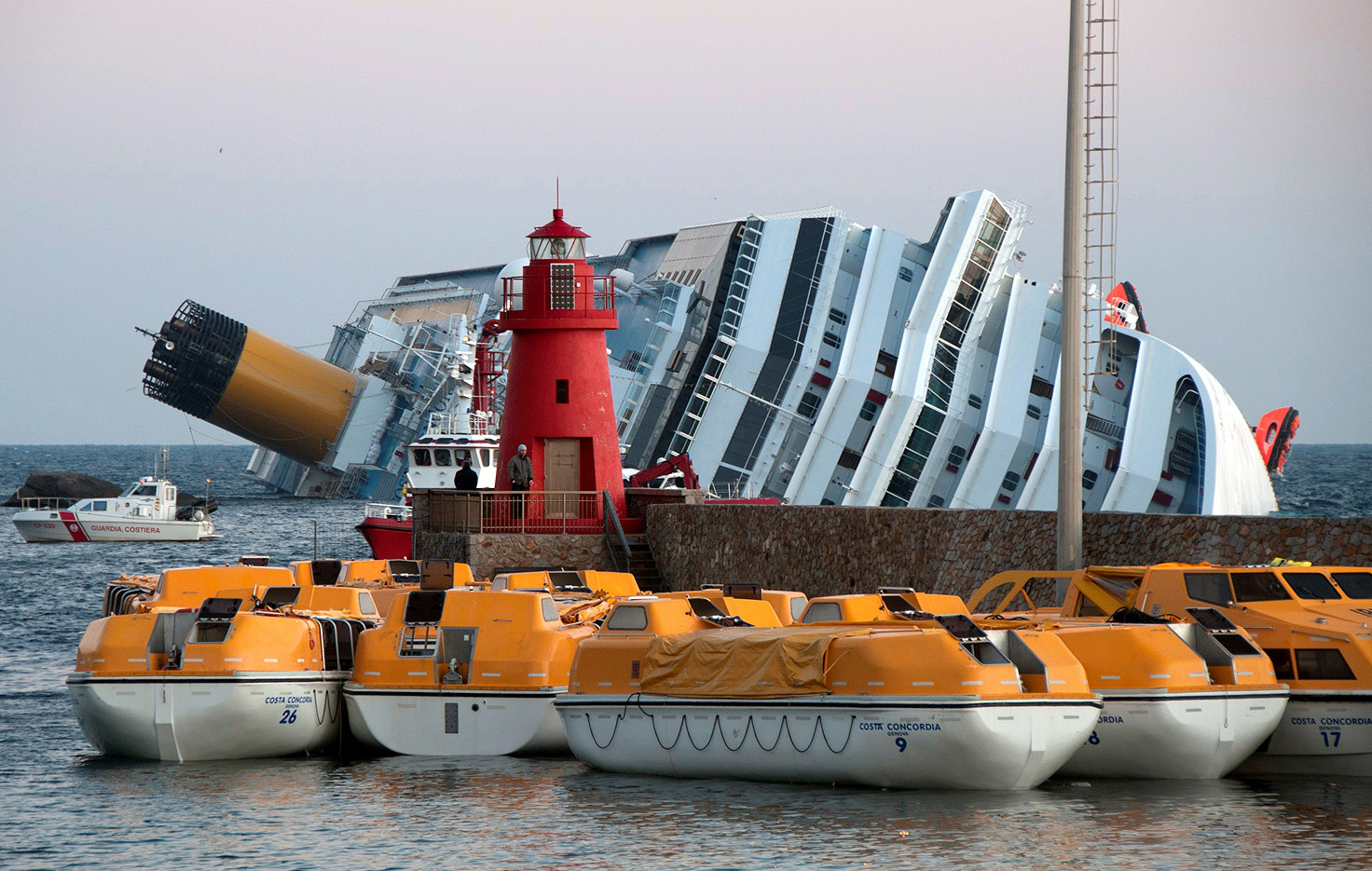
- Costa Concordia aground with rigid lifeboats in foreground and inflatables hanging from the side of the ship
- Date: 13 January 2012 (14 years ago)
- Time: 9:45 p.m. CET (20:45 UTC)
- Location: Tyrrhenian Sea Off of Isola del Giglio, Grosseto, Tuscany; 42°21′55″N 10°55′18″E
- Type: Ship grounding
- Cause: Struck a rock while deviating from planned course
- Participants: 4,252 on board; 3,206 passengers; 1,023 crew members
- Deaths: 32 (1 indirect); 32 on board; 27 passengers; 5 crew members; 1 during salvage (indirect); salvage diver
- Injuries: 64
- Captain: Francesco Schettino
- Operator: Costa Crociere
- Salvage: Fuel and oil extraction completed: Mar 2012; Salvage contract awarded: Apr 2012; Parbuckling (righting) completed: 17 September 2013; Refloated and towed to Genoa: Jul 2014; Final scrapping completed: 7 July 2017

On 13 January 2012, the seven-year-old Costa Cruises vessel Costa Concordia was on the first leg of a cruise around the Mediterranean Sea when the cruise ship deviated from her planned route at Isola del Giglio, Italy, in order to perform a sail-by salute, and as a consequence struck a rock formation on the sea floor. This caused the ship to list and then to partially sink, landing unevenly on an underwater ledge. Although a six-hour rescue effort brought most of the passengers ashore, 32 people died: 27 passengers and five crew members. A member of the salvage team also died following injuries received during the recovery operation.

An investigation focused on shortcomings in the procedures followed by Costa Concordia's crew and the actions of its captain, Francesco Schettino, who left the ship prematurely. He left about 300 passengers on board the sinking vessel, most of whom were rescued by helicopter or motorboats in the area. Schettino was found guilty of manslaughter and sentenced to 16 years in prison. Despite receiving its own share of criticism, Costa Cruises and its parent company, Carnival Corporation, did not face criminal charges.

Costa Concordia was declared a constructive total loss by the cruise line's insurer, and her salvage was "one of the biggest maritime salvage operations". On 16 September 2013, the parbuckle salvage of the ship began, and by the early hours of 17 September, the ship was set upright on her underwater cradle. In July 2014, the ship was refloated using sponsons (flotation tanks) welded to her sides, and was towed 170 nautical miles (200 mi; 310 km) to her home port of Genoa for scrapping, which was completed in July 2017.

The total cost of the disaster, including victims' compensation, refloating, towing and scrapping costs, is estimated at $2 billion, more than three times the ship's $612 million construction cost. Costa Cruises offered compensation to passengers (to a limit of €11,000 per person) to pay for all damages, including the value of the cruise; however, only one third of the survivors took the offer.

== Impact ==
Costa Concordia disaster (Italy)

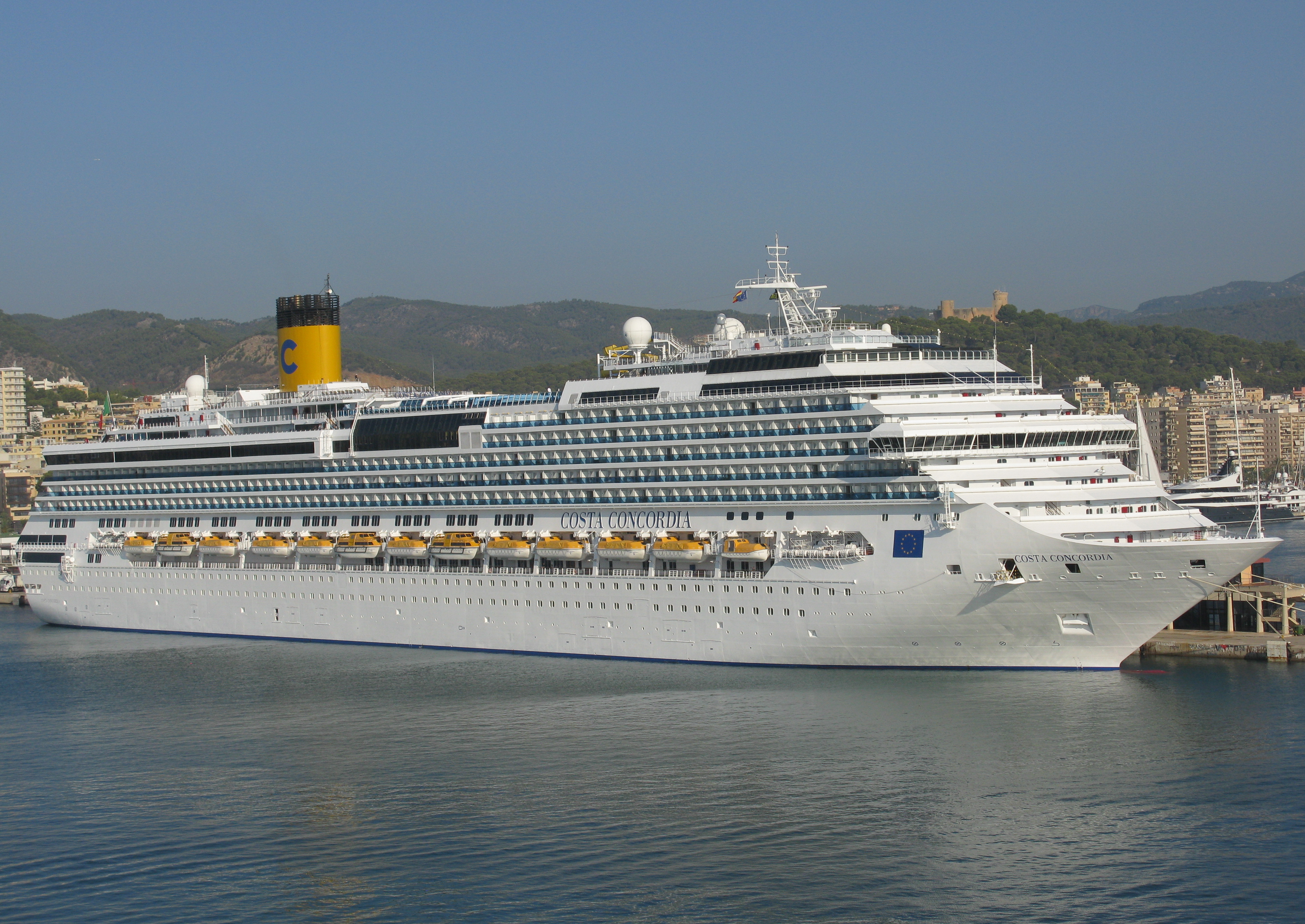
Costa Concordia as seen at Palma, Majorca, in September 2011

Costa Concordia, with 3,206 passengers and 1,023 crew members on board, was sailing off Isola del Giglio on the night of 13 January 2012, having begun a planned seven-day cruise from Civitavecchia, Lazio, Italy, to Savona and five other ports. The port side of the ship struck a rock called Isole Le Scole at 21:42 or 21:45 local time. After the impact, the ship then managed to carry on further north with the rudders and no propulsive power before turning and capsizing at Punta Gabbianara.

The point of initial impact was eight metres (26 ft) below water at Isole Le Scole, which tore a 35-metre (115 ft) gash in Costa Concordia's port side below the waterline. The impact sheared two long strips of steel from the ship's hull; these were later found on the seabed 92 to 96 metres (302 to 315 ft) from the main island. A few minutes after the impact, the head of the engine room warned the ship's captain, Francesco Schettino, that the hull had an irreparable tear of 35 metres (115 ft) through which water entered and submerged the generators and engines.

Without propulsive power and no emergency electric power, Costa Concordia moved by inertia and the settings of her rudders, and continued north from Le Scole until well past Giglio Porto. Schettino has said various instruments were not functioning. Reports differ whether the ship listed to port soon after the impact and when she began listing to starboard. At 22:10, Costa Concordia turned south. The vessel was then listing to starboard, initially by about 20°, coming to rest by 22:44 at Punta Gabbianara in about 20 metres (11 fathoms; 66 ft) of water at an angle of heel of about 70°. Schettino attributed the final grounding of the ship at Punta Gabbianara to his own effort to manoeuvre it there; in contrast, on 3 February, the chief of the Italian Coast Guard testified that the final grounding of the ship may not have been related to any attempts to manoeuvre the ship and it may have simply drifted in the prevailing winds that night.

=== Situation on the bridge ===
Schettino said that, before approaching the island, he turned off the alarm system for Costa Concordia's computer navigation system. "I was navigating by sight, because I knew those seabeds well. I had done the move three, four times." He told investigators that he saw waves breaking on the reef and turned abruptly, swinging the side of the hull into the reef. Admitting to a "judgment error", Schettino acknowledged ordering the ship's turn too late. The captain initially said the ship was about 300 metres (330 yd; 980 ft) from the shore (about the length of the vessel) and hit an uncharted rock. The ship's first officer, Ciro Ambrosio, told investigators Schettino had left his reading glasses in his cabin and repeatedly asked Ambrosio to check the radar for him.

Schettino claimed that Costa Cruises managers told him to perform a sail-past salute on the night of the disaster. The ship had taken a similar sail-past route on 14 August 2011, but not as close to Le Scole. The 2011 sail-past was approved by the cruise line and was done in daylight during an island festival. The normal shipping route passes about 4.3 nautical miles (8.0 km; 4.9 mi) offshore. (Note: In August 2011, Giglio Porto's mayor, Sergio Ortelli, had thanked Captain Schettino for the "incredible spectacle" of a sail-past. Mayor Ortelli has now said, "It's a very nice show to see, the ship all lit up when you see it from the land. This time round it went wrong". In August and September 2010, Costa Pacifica and Costa Allegra, sister ships of Costa Concordia, came within a mile of the island.)

Costa Cruises confirmed that the course taken in 2012 was "not a defined [computer programmed] route for passing Giglio". (Note: Costa Cruises CEO Pier Luigi Foschi explained that the company's ships have computer-programmed routes and "alarms, both visual and sound, if the ship deviates by any reason from the stated route as stored in the computer and as controlled by the GPS", but that these alarms could be "manually" over-ridden.) In an interview with the Italian television channel Canale 5 on 10 July 2012, Schettino said this was a contributing factor to the accident. In addition, at the captain's invitation, the maître d'hôtel of the ship, who was from Isola del Giglio, was on the ship's bridge to view the island during the sail-past. A further person on the bridge was a Moldovan dancer, Domnica Cemortan, who testified that she was in a romantic relationship with Schettino and had boarded the ship as a non-paying passenger.

=== Situation on deck ===
Passengers were in the dining hall when there was a sudden, loud bang, which a crew member (speaking over the intercom) ascribed to an "electrical failure". "We told the guests everything was [okay] and under control and we tried to stop them panicking", a cabin steward recalled. Two brothers who were passengers later reported that during this time, "My Heart Will Go On" from the 1997 film Titanic was playing in the dining hall. The ship lost cabin electrical power shortly after the initial impact. "The [ship] started shaking. The noise—there was panic, like in a film, dishes crashing to the floor, people running, [and] falling down the stairs", reported a survivor. Those on board said the ship suddenly tilted to the port side. Passengers were later advised to put on their life jackets.

Half an hour before the abandon-ship order, one crew member was recorded on video telling passengers at a muster station, "We have solved the problems we had and invite everyone to return to their cabins." When the ship later turned around, it began to list approximately 20° to the starboard side, creating problems in launching the lifeboats. The president of Costa Cruises, Gianni Onorato, said normal lifeboat evacuation became "almost impossible" because the ship listed so quickly.

Maps of route

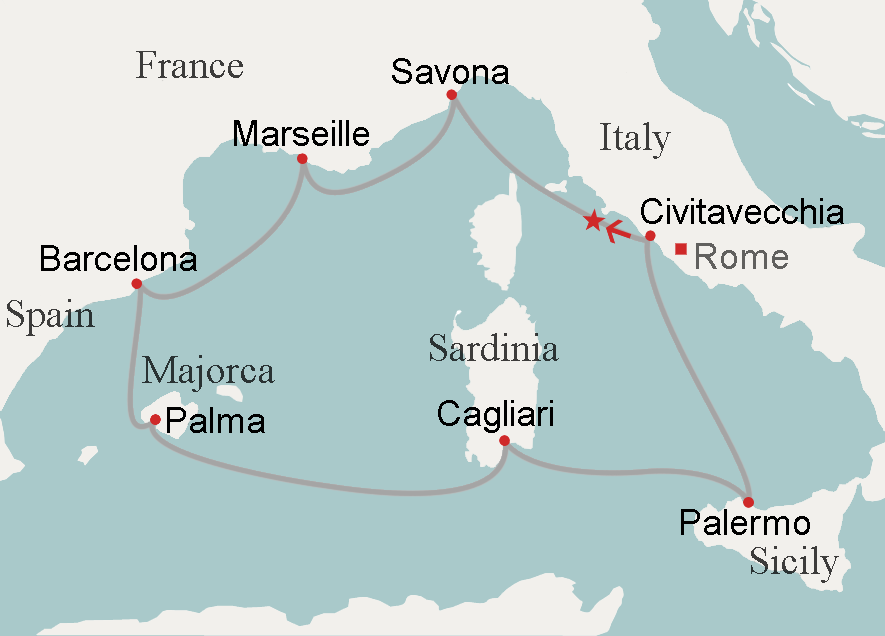
Route of Mediterranean cruise from Civitavecchia and back. Arrow: journey on first leg; star: impact with reef.

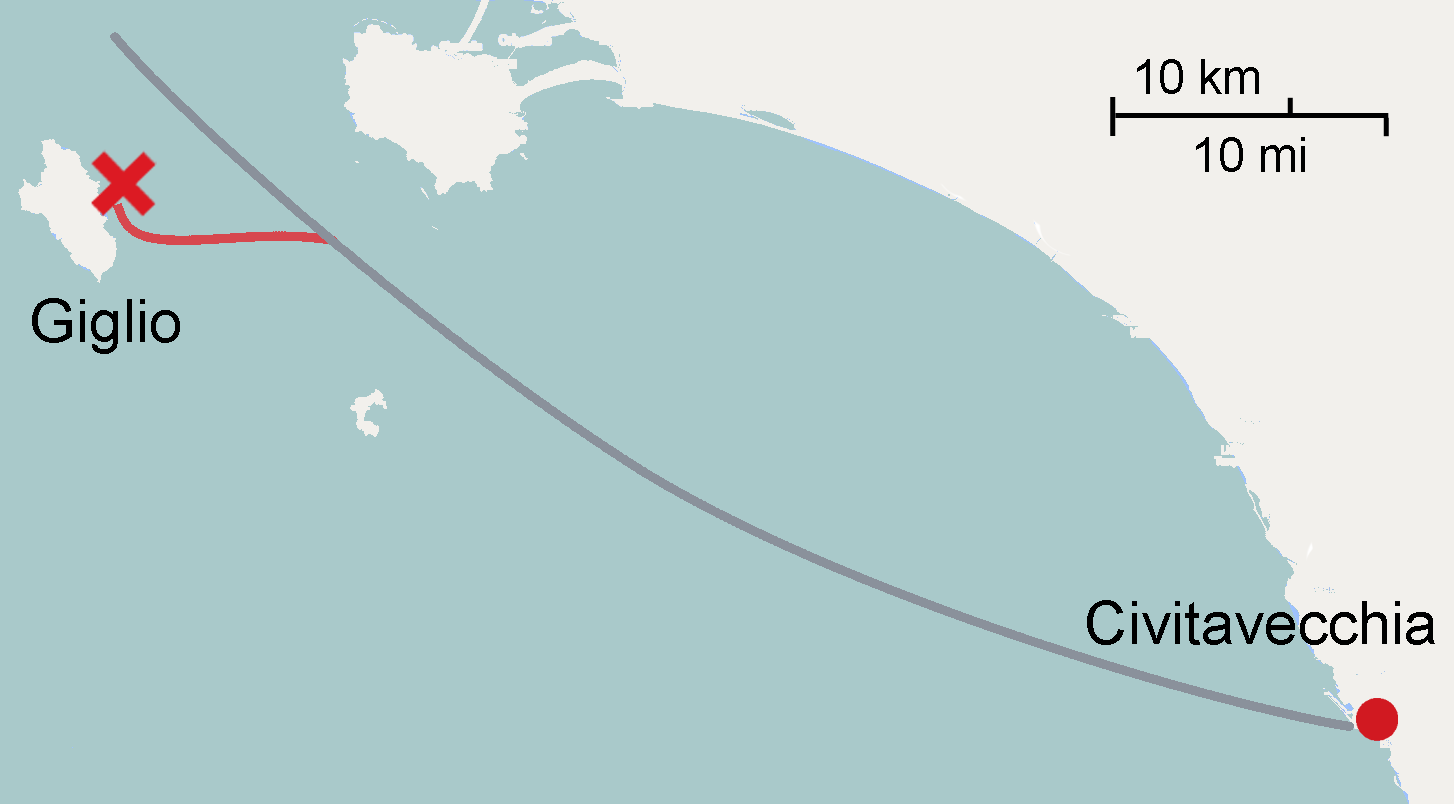
Planned route (starting at 19:20 UTC+1) together with deviation (starting at 21:10 UTC+1) ending off Giglio

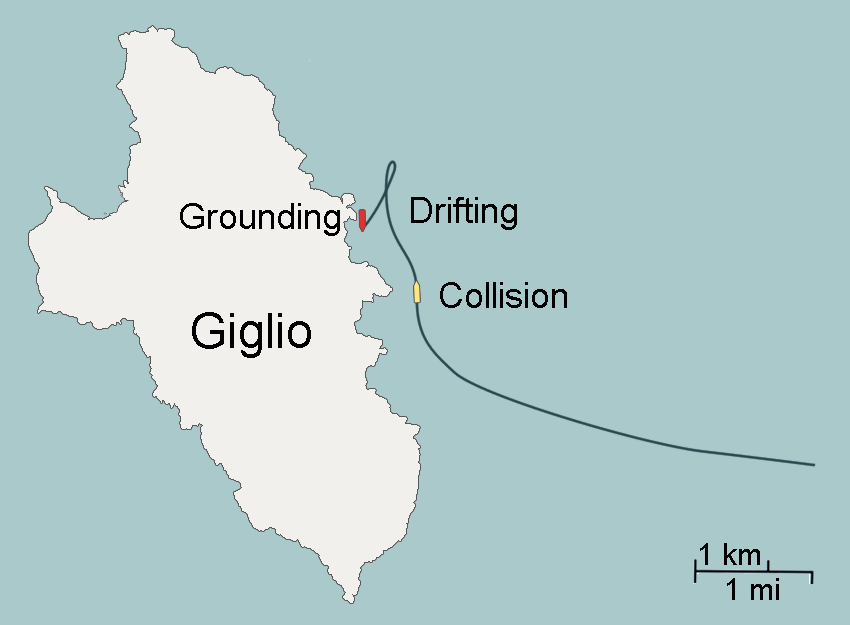
Deviation (from 21:30 UTC+1) leading to disaster (21:45 UTC+1) and grounding (23:00 UTC+1)

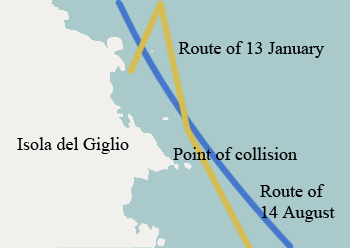
Route leading to disaster compared to route of 14 August 2011

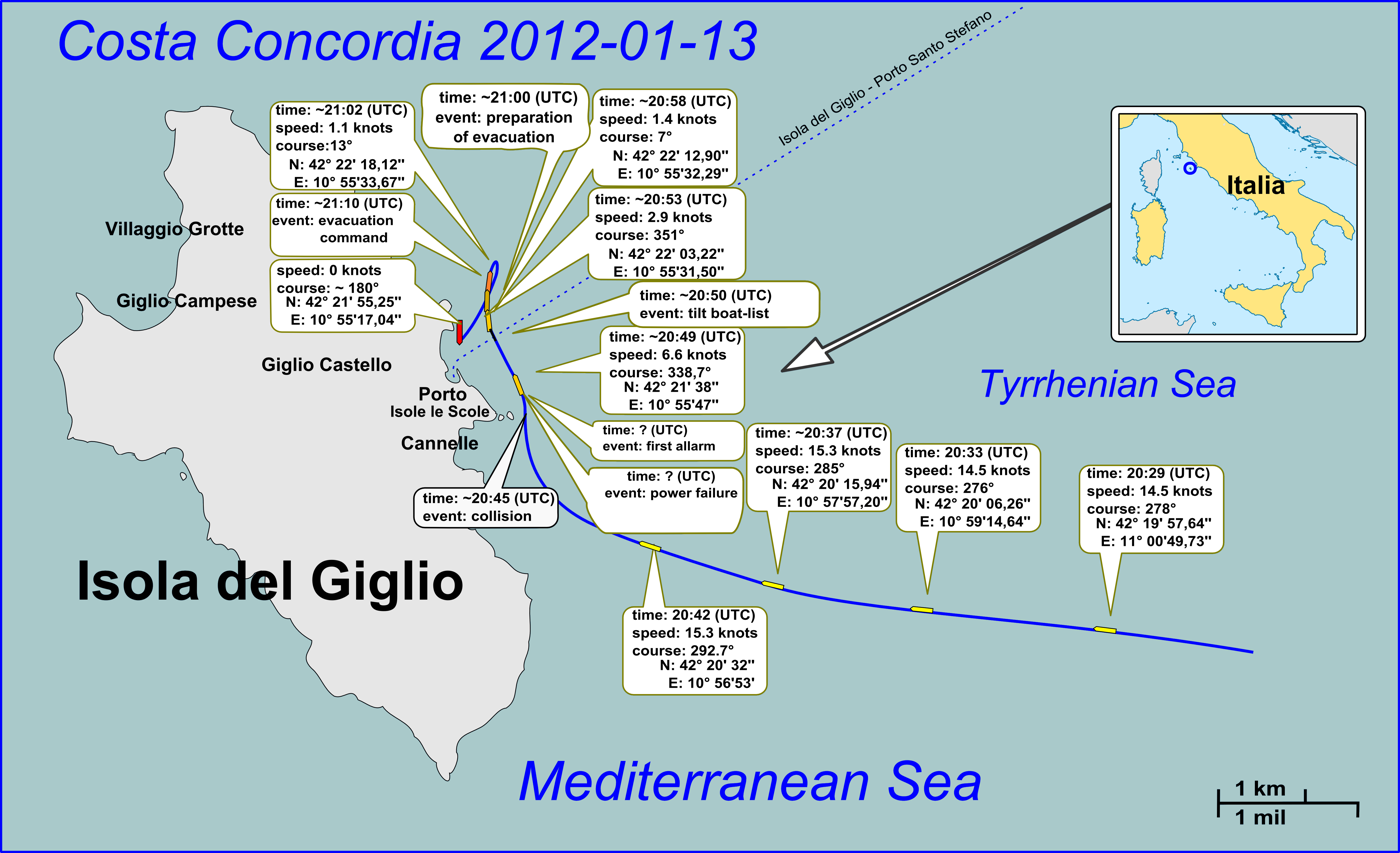
Timeline of the disaster

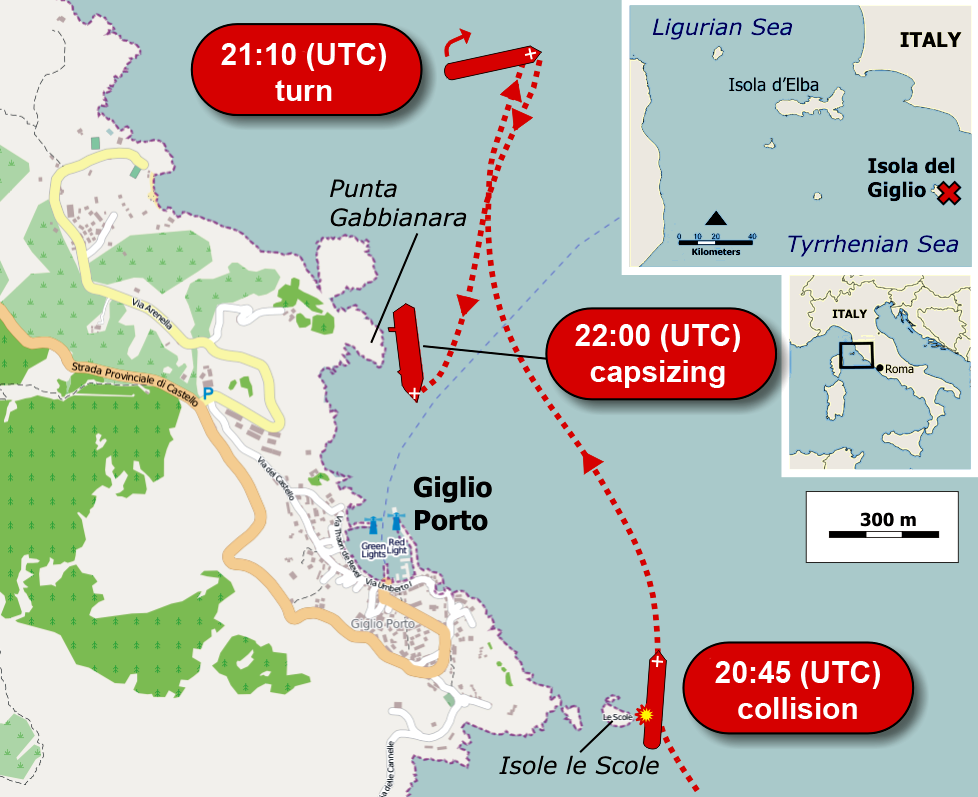
Closeup of the disaster

== Rescue ==
=== Evacuation ===
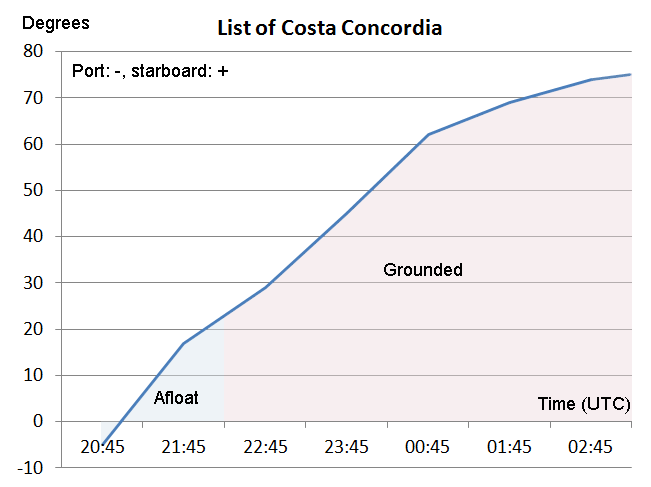
List of Costa Concordia from impact at 20:45 (UTC) until complete rest at 03:00. Shift from port to starboard list takes place around the time of the u-turn.

In the first contact, made at 22:12, between the Port of Livorno's harbormaster, a 37-year-old Coast Guard Petty Officer named Alessandro Tosi, and Costa Concordia after the impact on the reef, an unidentified officer on board the cruise ship insisted they were suffering only from an electrical "black-out" from a blown electrical generator.

A passenger's video recorded at 22:20 showed panicked passengers in life jackets being told by a crew member that "everything is under control" and that they should return to their cabins. No mandatory lifeboat passenger evacuation drill had taken place for the approximately 600 passengers who had just embarked prior to the voyage. Around the same time, a patrol boat of the Guardia di Finanza made a call to Costa Concordia, but no answer came. Schettino participated in three telephone calls with the cruise line's crisis management officer.

At 22:26, Schettino told the Harbormaster that the ship had taken water through an opening in the port side and requested a tugboat. Port authorities were not alerted to the disaster until 22:42, about an hour after the impact, and the order to evacuate the ship was not given until 22:50. Some passengers jumped into the water to swim to shore, while others, ready to evacuate the vessel, were delayed by crew members up to 45 minutes, as they resisted immediately lowering the lifeboats. Some sources report that the ship did not list until 23:15 and, therefore, if Schettino had given the order to abandon ship, the lifeboats could have been launched earlier, allowing the passengers to reach safety. In contrast, one expert stated that a delay might be justified considering the hazards in launching lifeboats while a ship is still moving. Staff or 2nd captain Roberto Bosio is said to have coordinated some of the deck officers in much of the evacuation. He began to evacuate the ship before Schettino's order. Many junior officers and crew members who were aware of the severity of the situation also began readying lifeboats and moving passengers from their cabins before the abandon ship orders were given, a move that has been characterised as a "mutiny".

While the vast majority of the ship's multinational personnel held positions that did not require a seaman's qualifications (as they handled services like laundry, cooking, entertainment, cleaning, minding children, and waiting tables), according to a senior shipping official, they had received mandatory training in basic safety to be able to help in situations like this. Although all of them spoke at least basic English, most spoke no Italian.

Several passengers asserted that the crew did not help or were untrained in launching the lifeboats. This allegation was denied by the crew, one of whom stated, "The crew members, whether Filipino or Colombians or Indians, tried to the best of our ability to help passengers survive the shipwreck. Comments by some of the passengers that we were unhelpful have hurt us." A third engineer officer from the ship's engine room also pointed out that "Unlike the captain, we were there until the end. We did all we could to avoid catastrophe." Costa Cruises CEO Pier Luigi Foschi praised the crew and personnel, despite difficulties resulting from the apparent lack of direction from the ship's officers and problems in communication.

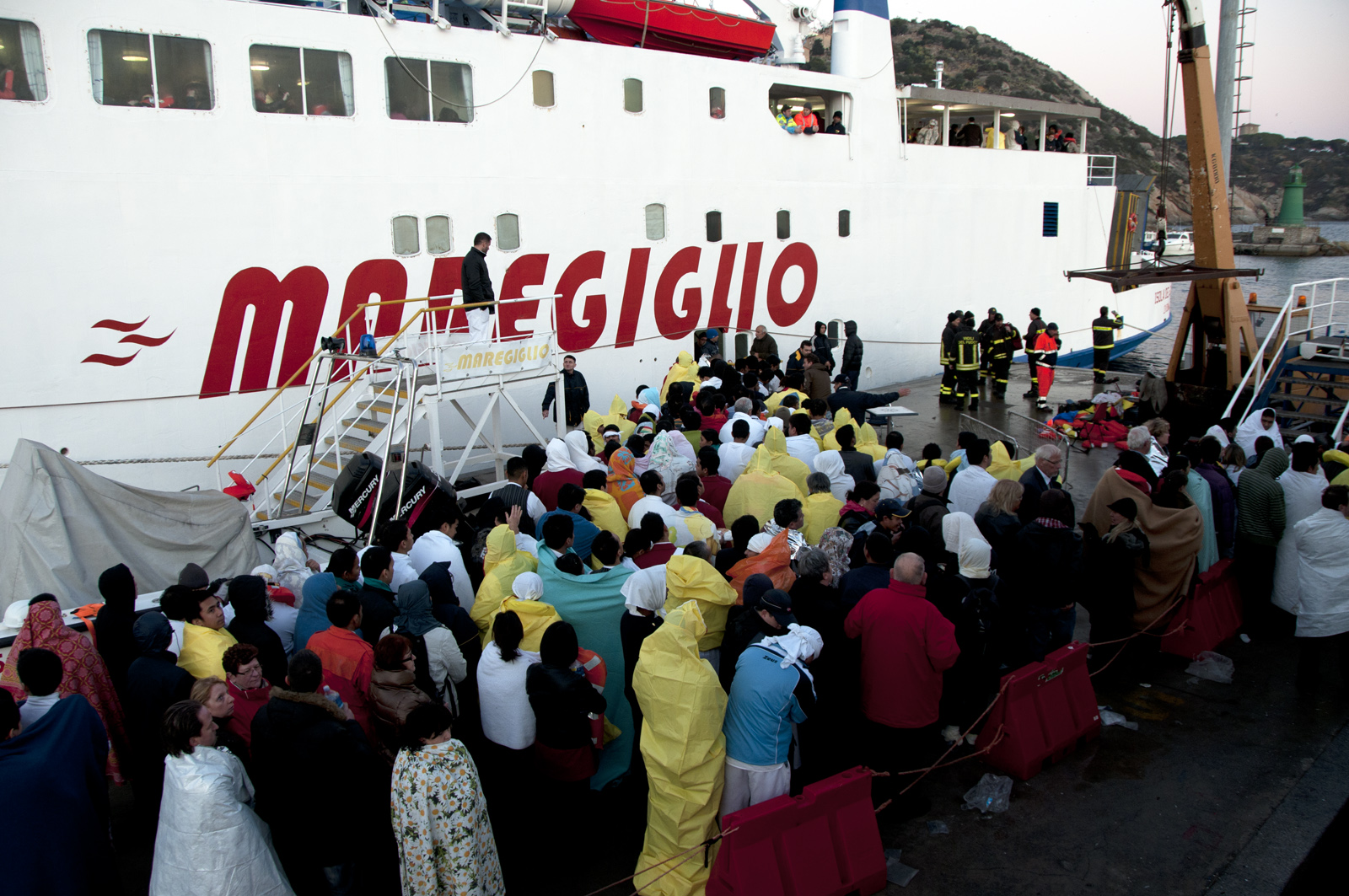
Rescued passengers huddle ashore

Three people reportedly drowned after jumping overboard, and another seven were critically injured. The local fire chief said his men "plucked 100 people from the water and saved around 60 others who were trapped in the boat". Five helicopters from the Italian Coast Guard, Navy and Air Force took turns airlifting survivors still aboard and ferrying them to safety.

According to investigators, Schettino had left the ship by 23:30. He later claimed he had slipped and accidentally fell into a lifeboat. In one telephone call from the Coast Guard to Schettino, Captain Gregorio de Falco, a captain from Livorno, repeatedly ordered Schettino to return to the ship from his lifeboat and take charge of the ongoing passenger evacuation. At one point in the call, de Falco grew so angry at Schettino's stalling that he raised his voice and told Schettino, "Vada a bordo, cazzo!" (variously translated as "Get the fuck [back] on board!", "Get [back] on board, for fuck's sake!", or "Get on board, damn it!", depending on the source). One of these calls took place at 01:46. Despite this, Schettino never returned to the ship from the lifeboat into which he claimed he had fallen.

At 01:04, an Air Force officer who was lowered on board by helicopter reported that there were still 100 people on board. Father Raffaele Malena, the ship's priest, said he was among the last leaving the ship at around 01:30. The deputy mayor of Isola del Giglio, Mario Pellegrini, who went on board as part of the rescue operations, praised the ship's doctor and a young Costa Concordia officer, Simone Canessa, the only officer he met on board, for their help. He and Canessa were "shoulder to shoulder" until 05:30. One of the missing crewmen, a waiter, was last seen helping passengers.

At 03:05, 600 passengers were evacuated to the mainland by ferry. At 03:44, the Air Force officer reported that 40 to 50 people were still on board. At 04:46, the evacuation was noted as "complete" on the Port of Livorno's Harbour Master log. The next day, the survivors were transported to Porto Santo Stefano, where the first centre for coordination and assistance was established. Prime Minister Mario Monti announced his intention to propose to the President of the Republic to grant the gold medal for civil valor to the common people of Isola del Giglio and Monte Argentario for their conduct during the rescue.

=== Search for missing people ===
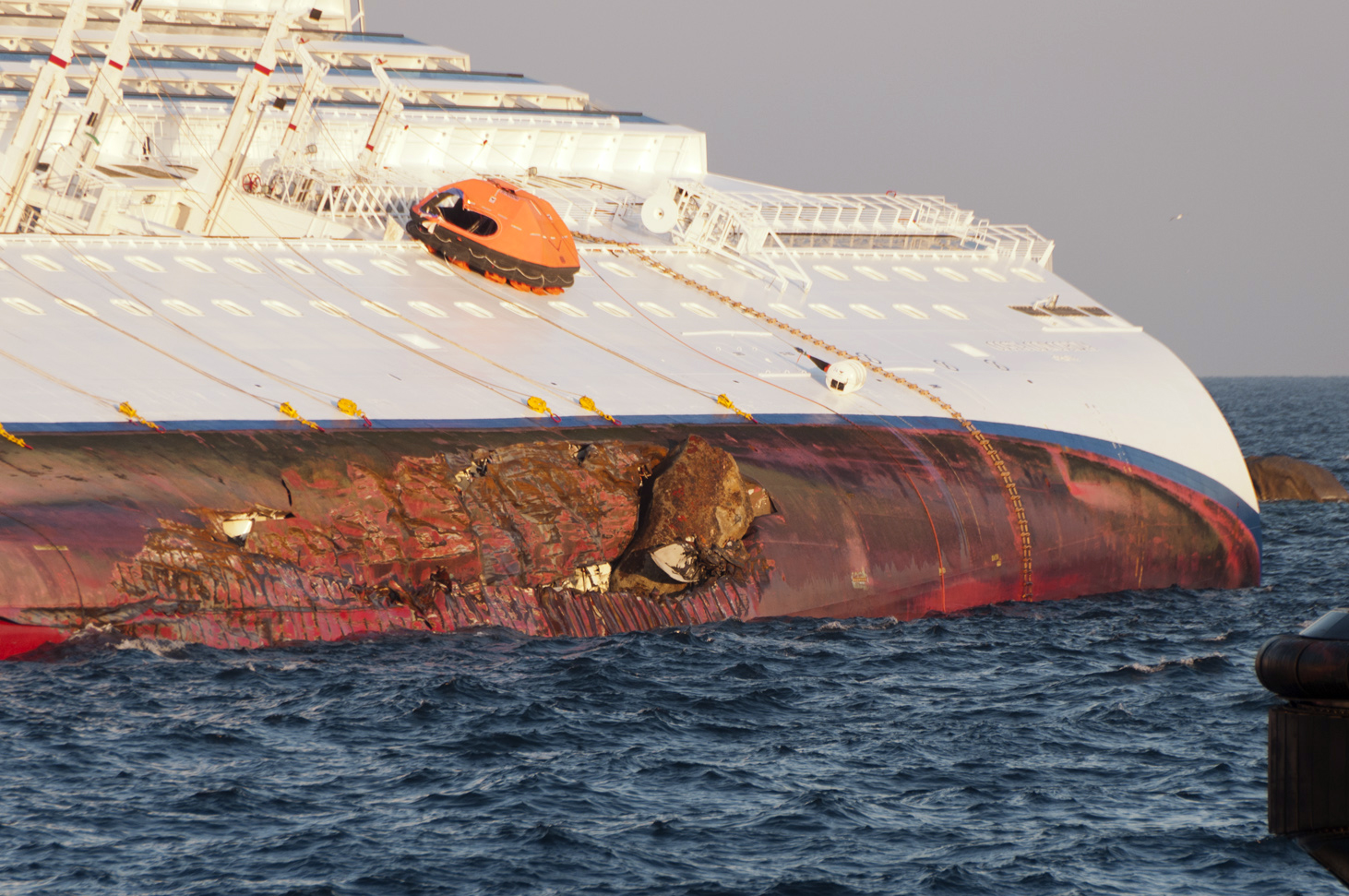
Wrecked ship with boulder in hull gash

Between 14 and 30 January 2012, rescue divers from the Italian Navy, Coast Guard, and Vigili del Fuoco (fire and rescue service) searched within the ship for missing people. The head of the coast guard diving team described the conditions inside the ship, still perched on a 37-metre (120 ft) ledge, as "disastrous". Pitch-black conditions with large furniture drifting around made the rescue operation hazardous. Divers would find a path into the ship and tie down obstacles such as mattresses, before making noise to alert trapped people.

The divers worked in pairs for safety (standard procedure for any diving operations, even for leisure) and searched each assigned area slowly in a zig-zag manner. The search dives were planned as 50 minutes in duration, with extra air tanks positioned within the ship in case of emergency. The divers had two headlamps positioned on their helmets because underwater visibility varied from approximately 80 to 10 centimetres (30 to 4 in). In addition, divers marked their route by trailing a line to be used to lead them back out in low visibility, similar to procedures used in recreational wreck diving.

On 14 January, divers searched the ship until nightfall. Divers and firefighters continued to search for survivors who might have been trapped in the ship, and rescued a South Korean newlywed couple who slept through the partial sinking, only to wake and find that they could not open their cabin's door, two decks above the water line, and the ship's purser, who had a broken leg.

On 16 January, violent waters shifted the ship about 1.5 centimetres (0.6 in), interrupting rescue work—trap doors were shut and debris fell on rescuers—and giving rise to fear that the ship could be pushed into 68-metre (224 ft) deep waters or that the fuel could leak. Operations resumed about three hours later. Throughout the process, rescuers set off explosives to create holes in the ship's hull to reach previously inaccessible areas. On 18 January, rescue efforts were suspended again when the ship shifted, but shortly afterward they were resumed.

On 20 January, the ship began shifting by 1.5 centimetres (0.6 in) per hour, but on 24 January, Franco Gabrielli, the Italian Civil Protection Agency head, said the ship was "stable". The same day, divers recovered the body of the 16th victim. On 29 January, the operation was suspended because the ship had shifted 3.8 centimetres (1.5 in) in six hours and because of high waves. Gabrielli said, "Our first goal was to find people alive ... Now we have a single, big goal, and that is that this does not translate into an environmental disaster." By the next day, operations resumed.

On 28 January, the 17th body, that of a female crew member, was recovered from a submerged part of the vessel. On 31 January, Italy's Civil Protection agency terminated the search in the submerged part of the ship because the deformed hull caused unacceptable safety concerns for divers. On 22 February, guided by information from passengers as to where bodies might be, divers found eight additional bodies in the wreck. A "special platform" was assembled to facilitate swift recovery of the bodies, four of which were recovered. On 22 February, the recovery was suspended by inclement weather. On 4 March, officials reported that they would use "sophisticated robot-like equipment" to find the bodies.

On 22 March, another five bodies were discovered between the wreck and the seabed.

On 15 January 2013, the final two bodies were thought to have been located (those of a female passenger and a male crew member), but they reportedly could not be recovered because access to the location required the ship to be rotated first. However, the companies performing the refloating operation denied finding any bodies.

The search for the two still missing bodies continued after the ship was righted on 17 September 2013. On 26 September 2013, unidentified remains were found near the central part of the ship, where they were last seen. The remains were subjected to DNA testing to determine their identity. On 8 October 2013, the family of missing crew member Russel Rebello was informed that a body believed to be his had been found near the third deck at the stern of the ship. Items on the body were reportedly identified as belonging to missing passenger Maria Grazia Trecarichi instead and on 24 October 2013 it was reported that DNA analysis had confirmed it was her body. Additional bone fragments of unknown identity were found in the wreck a few days after the body was found.

On 23 October 2013, it was announced that the search for the missing while the wreck was still in the water was completed as far as was technically possible. Depending on the outcome of identification analyses of remains already found, it was stated that further search activities might be conducted in the wreck for the final missing body after it had been removed from the water.

On 6 and 7 August 2014, divers found human remains on the wreck which was then moored in the port of Genoa. On 3 November 2014, the final body was discovered in the wreckage of the ship.

== Wreck ==
=== Looting ===
Numerous reports of the wreck site being infiltrated by looters and souvenir hunters were made following the disaster. Items stolen from the wreck include the ship's bell, cash registers, jewellery, furniture, artwork and various assorted smaller items. Sources at Costa Crociere indicated that the thieves may have gained access to the interior of the ship via entrances cut by search and rescue teams.

=== Securing wreck site and protecting environment ===
Profile of stranded wreck with surrounding oil booms

Authorities banned all private boats from Giglio Porto and excluded them from a one-nautical-mile (1,852 m; 6,076 ft) non-navigation zone around the ship.

Poor weather conditions could have caused a spill of oil from the ship. A floating oil barrier was put in place as a precaution. High winds on 1 February lifted the protective barrier, allowing an oily film into the surrounding waters that began spreading from the stern of the ship. The protective boom was redesigned for the weather conditions.

On 7 February, Civil Protection director Franco Gabrielli told the Italian Senate that the waters were not completely clear of oil but are "within the legal limits". Environment Minister Corrado Clini told the Parliament of Italy that the amount of diesel fuel and lubricating oil on board Costa Concordia was about the cargo of a small oil tanker. Clini said any oil leakage would be highly toxic for plant and animal life. In a first step to prevent pollution of the shore and assist in refloating the ship, its oil and fuel tanks were emptied.

As part of the recovery effort, a group of about 200 giant fan mussels Pinna nobilis were manually relocated to a nearby area to avoid the threat posed by subsequent engineering work.

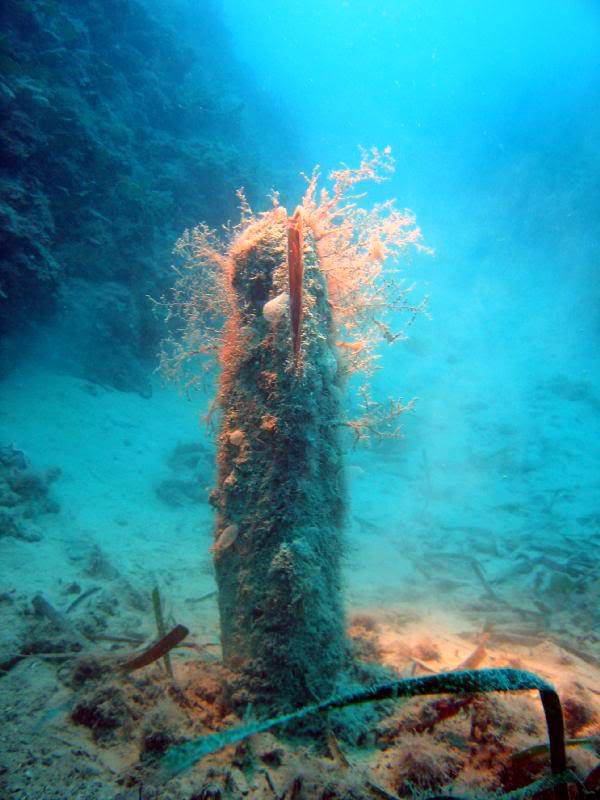
Giant fan mussel of the type relocated away from the Costa Concordia wreck for fear of the threat posed by subsequent engineering work

Isola del Giglio lies within the Pelagos Sanctuary for Mediterranean Marine Mammals, one of the Specially Protected Areas of Mediterranean Importance. It is a popular scuba diving destination, with tourism being its leading business. Island residents were concerned that the wreck would have a negative impact on tourism and, by extension, the island's economy because of its effect on the view in the area. One resident explained, "Environmental damage is what concerns us most. If the oil pollutes the coast, we're ruined." Luigi Alcaro, head of maritime emergencies for Italy's Institute for Environmental Protection and Research (ISPRA), an agency of the Ministry of the Environment, stated that in a worst case, "[W]e could be talking years and dozens of millions of euros".

EMSA-contracted stand-by oil spill response vessel Salina Bay arrived at the site of Costa Concordia on 28 January and remained on station as a precautionary measure during the fuel removal operation. ISPRA's Oceanographic Ship Astrea arrived in Tuscany on 29 January to conduct environmental investigations. On 9 February, the CEO of Costa Cruises told residents of Giglio the company would have a plan by mid-March to remove the ship. He also promised to minimise harm to their tourism businesses.

The wreck came to rest on a rock ledge and there were concerns that it might slide into deeper water. The stability and deformation of the ship were monitored by satellite imagery and surface-based instruments. Although the ship was not in "immediate risk" of slipping from its grounded position into deeper water, Environment Minister Clini told the Italian Senate on 8 February that "the risk for a collapse is quite real ... The more time passes, the weaker the hull becomes. We cannot guarantee that it has not been compromised already." On 29 January 2012, scientists had become "very concerned" that the ship had moved 3.5 centimetres (1.4 in) over six hours that day. On 2 February, the ship shifted 8 centimetres (3 in) during seven hours. Shifts and any high winds and high seas caused suspension of recovery and salvage operations.

On 16 February, Civil Protection director Gabrielli "confirmed that the data registered is absent of anomalies". Another report based on sonar and laser measurements, and an ISPRA underwater video, indicated that the ship might collapse in its midsection because its weight was not supported between the rock spur supporting the bow and the rock spur supporting the stern, and said at the time that both of those rocks had "now started crumbling dramatically". Civil Protection director Gabrielli stated that report was reassuring in that "It shows that a part of the seabed has got into the hull, basically increasing the ship'[s] stability." It was also found that the hull was slowly collapsing under its own weight, making salvage more difficult and expensive.

=== Salvage ===
On 12 February 2012, after weeks of weather delays, Dutch salvage firm Smit International, acting jointly with Italian company NERI SpA, started removing the vessel's 2,380 tonnes of heavy fuel oil. The 15 tanks that contained about 84% of the fuel in the vessel were emptied first and this operation was expected to take about 28 days. The second phase involved the engine room, which had "nearly 350 cubic metres [12,000 cu ft] of diesel, fuel and other lubricants". The offloading process required fixing valves to the underwater fuel tanks, one on top, one on the bottom. Hoses were then attached to the valves and as the oil, warmed to make it less viscous, was pumped out of the upper hose and into a nearby ship, it was replaced with sea water pumped in through the lower hose to fill the space, so as not to affect the ship's balance, a technique known as "hot-tapping".

Removal and clean-up plan

The operation (from June 2013 onwards) was delineated by Costa's Cristiano De Musso, Head of Corporate Communications, according to the following plan:

- Site inspections of the ship and its position;
- Securing of the wreck to ensure on-going safety and stability;
- Installation of sponsons on port side of vessel and construction of submarine platforms;
- Parbuckling of the wreck, rotating it past a critical angle of about 24° from its resting position, beyond which the sponsons would be flooded and the ship would roll into a fully upright position on the underwater platforms;
- Installation of sponsons on the starboard side of the ship;
- Sponsons are dewatered to raise the ship from the bottom;
- Ship delivered to an Italian port for processing according to regulations;
- Cleaning and replanting of marine flora.

By 20 February 2012, the tanks in the forward part of the ship, which had held about two-thirds of the fuel, had been emptied, but the following day defuelling was suspended because of poor weather conditions. On 3 March 2012, salvage workers cut a hole in the ship for access to the engine room, the location of the remaining fuel. On the morning of 12 March, defuelling operations resumed and were completed on 24 March.

With defuelling complete, removal of the wreck began. On 3 February, Franco Gabrielli, the head of the Civil Protection Authority, told a meeting of residents of Giglio that the ship would be "refloated and removed whole" and not cut up for scrap on site. The CEO of Costa stated that after the breaches in the hull were sealed, the ship could be refloated, with difficulty, by giant inflatable buoys and then towed away. The company invited 10 firms to bid for the contract to salvage the ship. Six bids were submitted in early March and the proposed removal plans were assessed jointly with the Civil Protection Scientific Committee. The salvage operation was expected to commence in the middle of May. The operation, one of the largest ever ventured, was predicted to take from 7 to 10 months, depending on weather and sea conditions.

By 12 April 2012, Costa Crociere had two consortia in mind: Smit and NERI, or Titan Salvage and Micoperi. On 21 April, it was announced that Florida-based marine salvage and wreck removal company Titan, with its partner company Micoperi, an Italian firm specialising in undersea engineering solutions, had been awarded the contract to refloat and tow Costa Concordia to a port on the Italian mainland. The salvage operation, using the port of Civitavecchia as its base was anticipated to begin in early May, take about 12 months and cost $300 million. Once in port, the ship would be dismantled and the materials sold as scrap. Zambian freelancer Nick Sloane was appointed as "salvage master" to lead the operation. The salvage plan included the following operations:

- Secure the hull to the land using steel cables, to stop it falling deeper
- Build a horizontal underwater platform below the ship
- Attach sponsons, to the port side of the hull
- Bring the hull to vertical, by winching (or parbuckling) the hull onto the platform
- Attach sponsons to the starboard side of the hull
- Refloat the hull and tanks
- Recovery tow to an Italian port

==== Parbuckling ====
Principles of righting and refloating of Costa Concordia

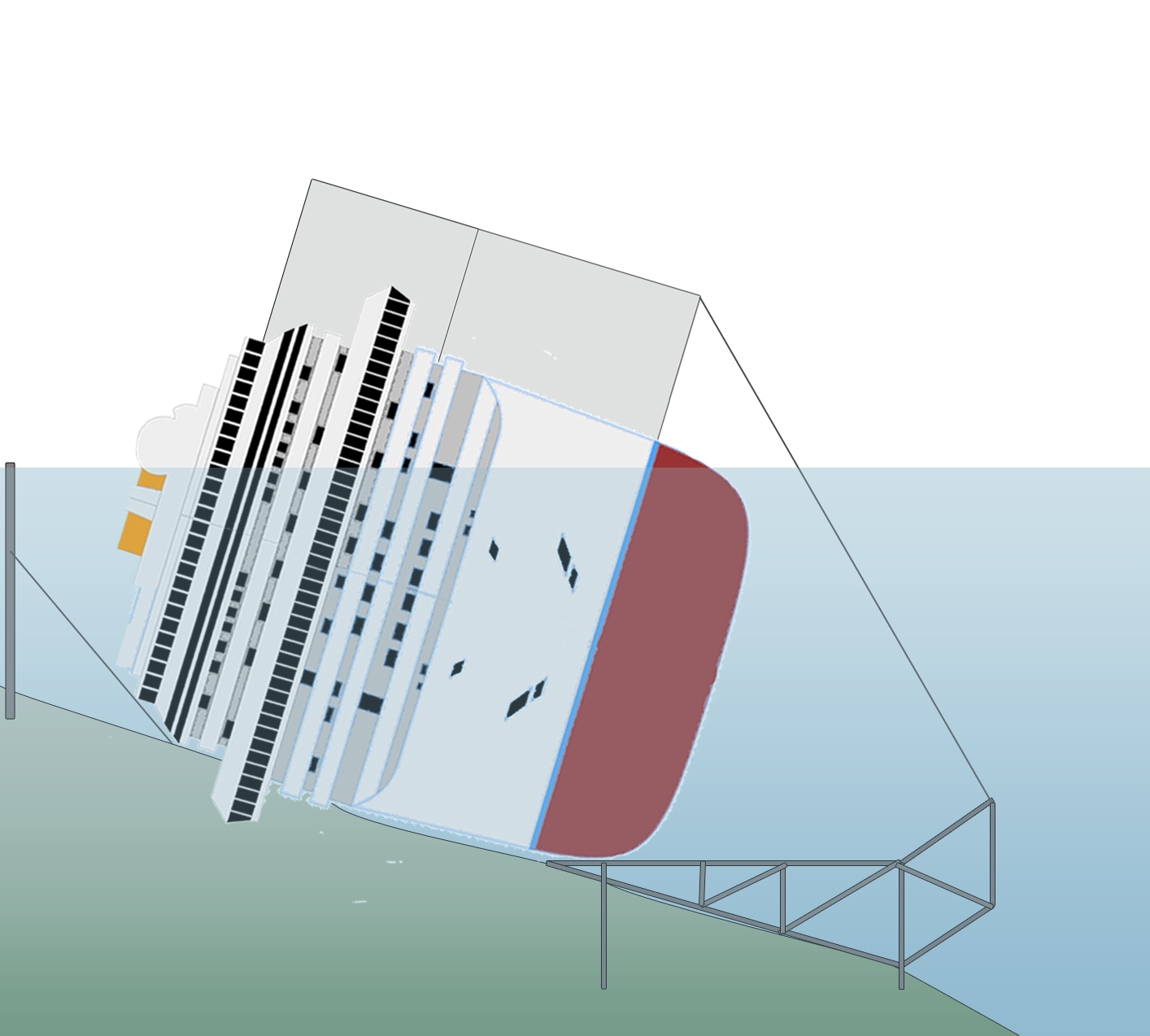
1

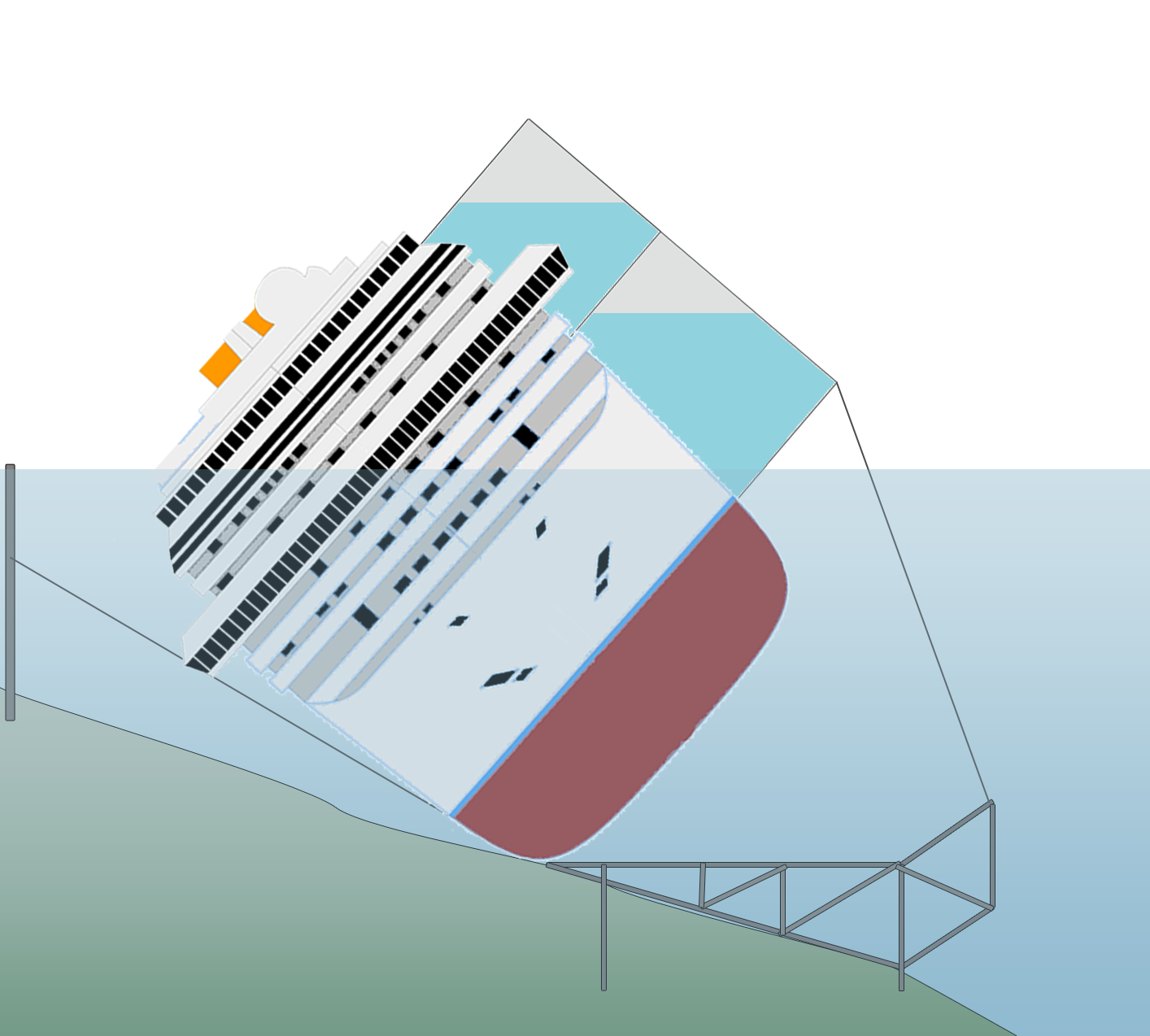
2

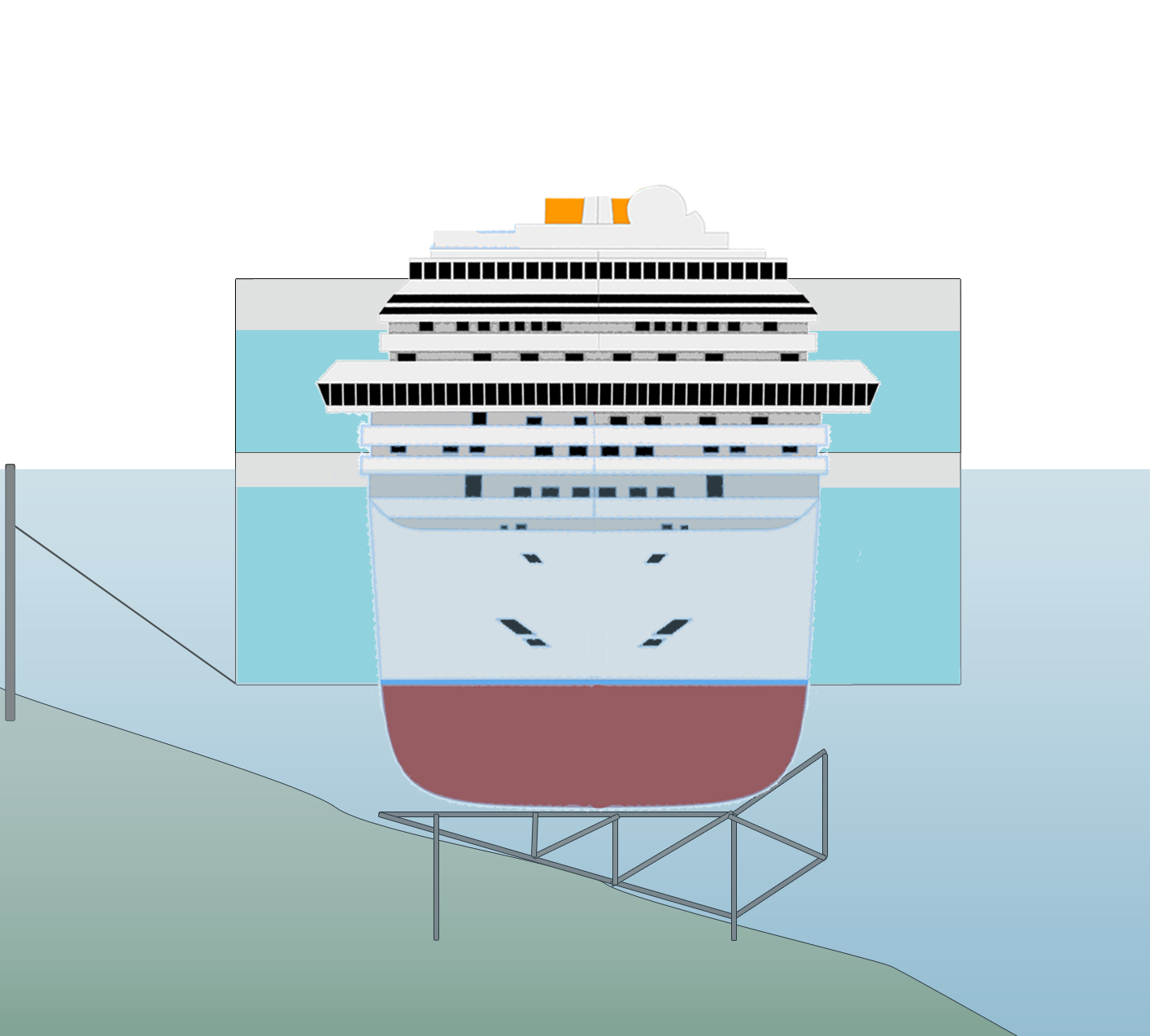
3

4

(1) Funnel (chimney) is removed and a submerged platform is built to support the ship. Steel sponsons are attached to the port side. (2) Sponsons are partially filled with water. Cables roll the ship upright, helped by the water weight in the sponsons. (3) Sponsons are attached to the starboard side and partially filled with water. (4) Water is pumped out of the sponsons to lift the ship so it can be towed away.

Preparatory work consisted of building an underwater metal platform and artificial seabed made of sand and cement on the downhill side of the wreck and welding sponsons to the side of the ship above the surface. Once this was completed, the ship was pulled upright by cables over the course of two days and settled on the platform, a method called parbuckling. Additional sponsons would then be attached to the other side of the ship; both sets would be flushed of water and their buoyancy would refloat the ship to allow it to be towed away for demolition.

In June 2012, a barge was put in place, and the removal of the Costa Concordia's radar, waterslide and funnel began before stabilisation of the ship to prevent further slippage down the sloped seabed. Costa Concordia's funnel was cut off in December, and the salvage companies were in the process of building the underwater support structure by mid-January 2013. On 16 September 2013, the parbuckling of the ship began.

The operation to right the ship and free it from the rocks began on 16 September 2013 but was delayed by bad weather. Once the ship had been rotated slightly past a critical angle of 24° from its resting position, valves on the sponsons were opened to allow seawater to flood into them and the increasing weight of the water in the sponsons completed the rolling of the ship to the upright position at an accelerated pace, without further need of the strand jacks and cables. The ship was returned to a fully upright position in the early hours of 17 September 2013, shortly before 3:00 a.m. CET. As of 16 September 2013 the salvage operation had cost over €600 million ($800 million). The final cost of the salvage came to be $1.2 billion.

==== Images of righting of Costa Concordia ====
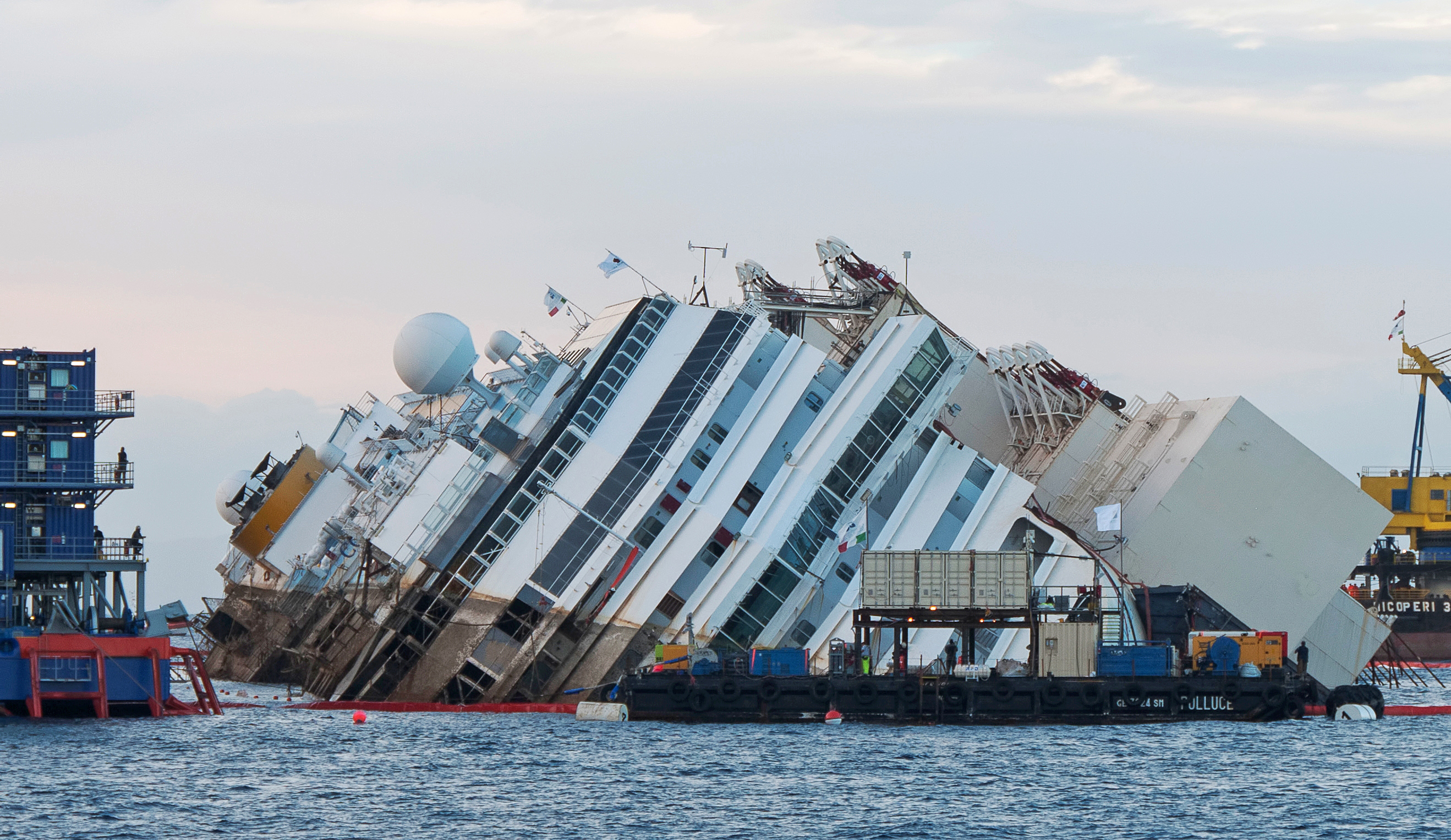
The operation progresses slowly, at less than 2 degrees per hour. On the right are the port side sponsons.

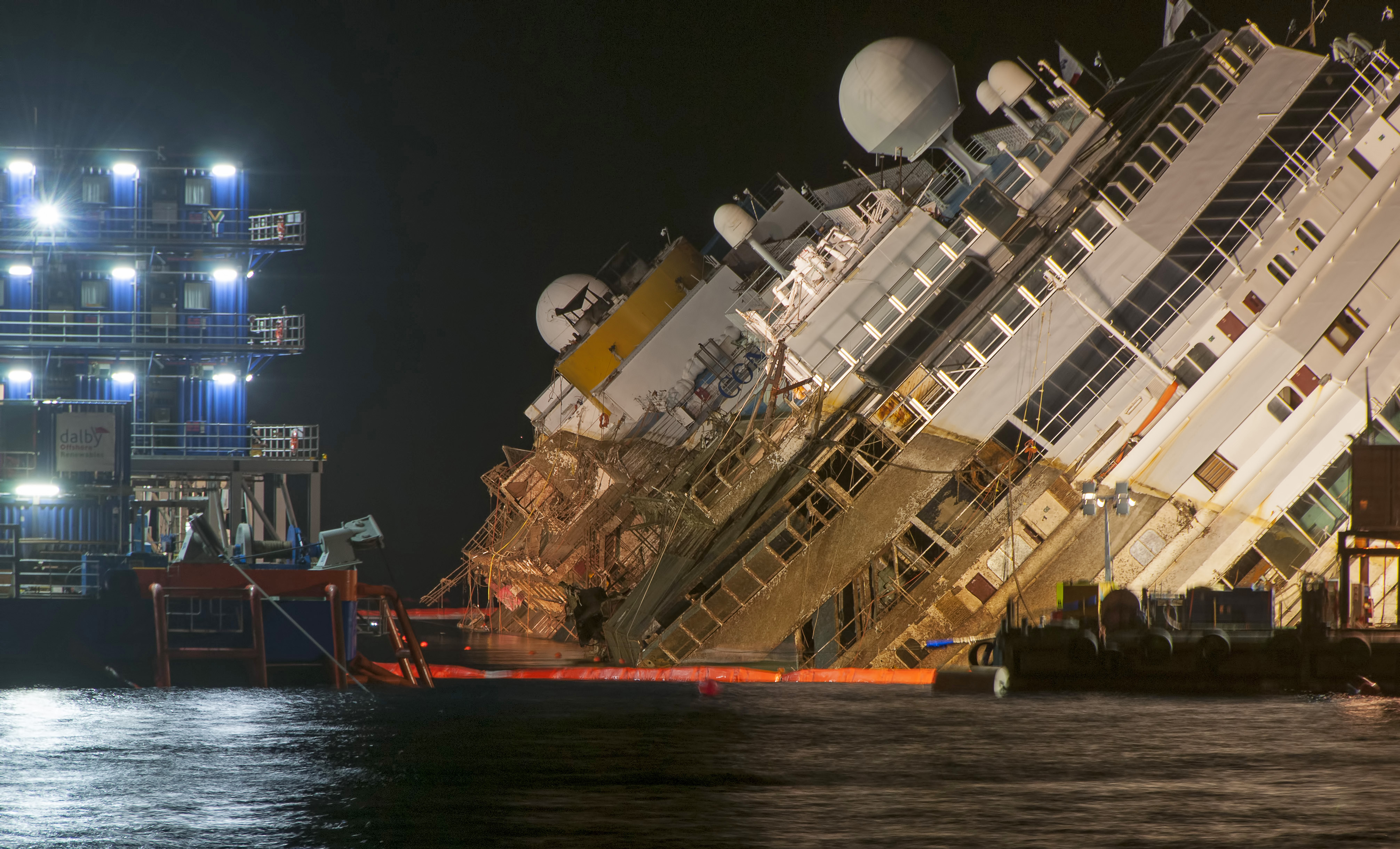
Sponsons ready to fill with sea water, nearing 24 degrees of rotation

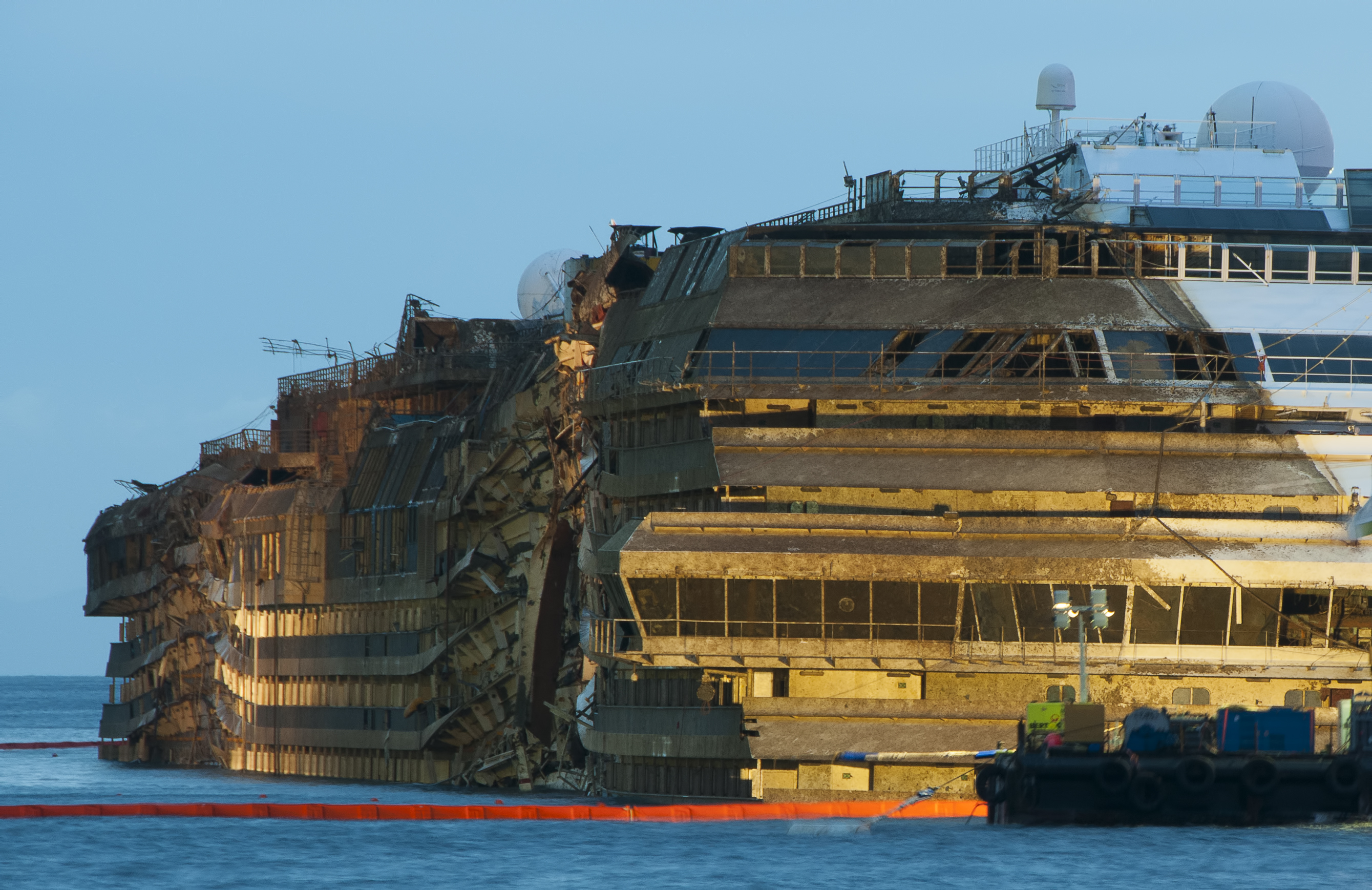
The morning after the parbuckling

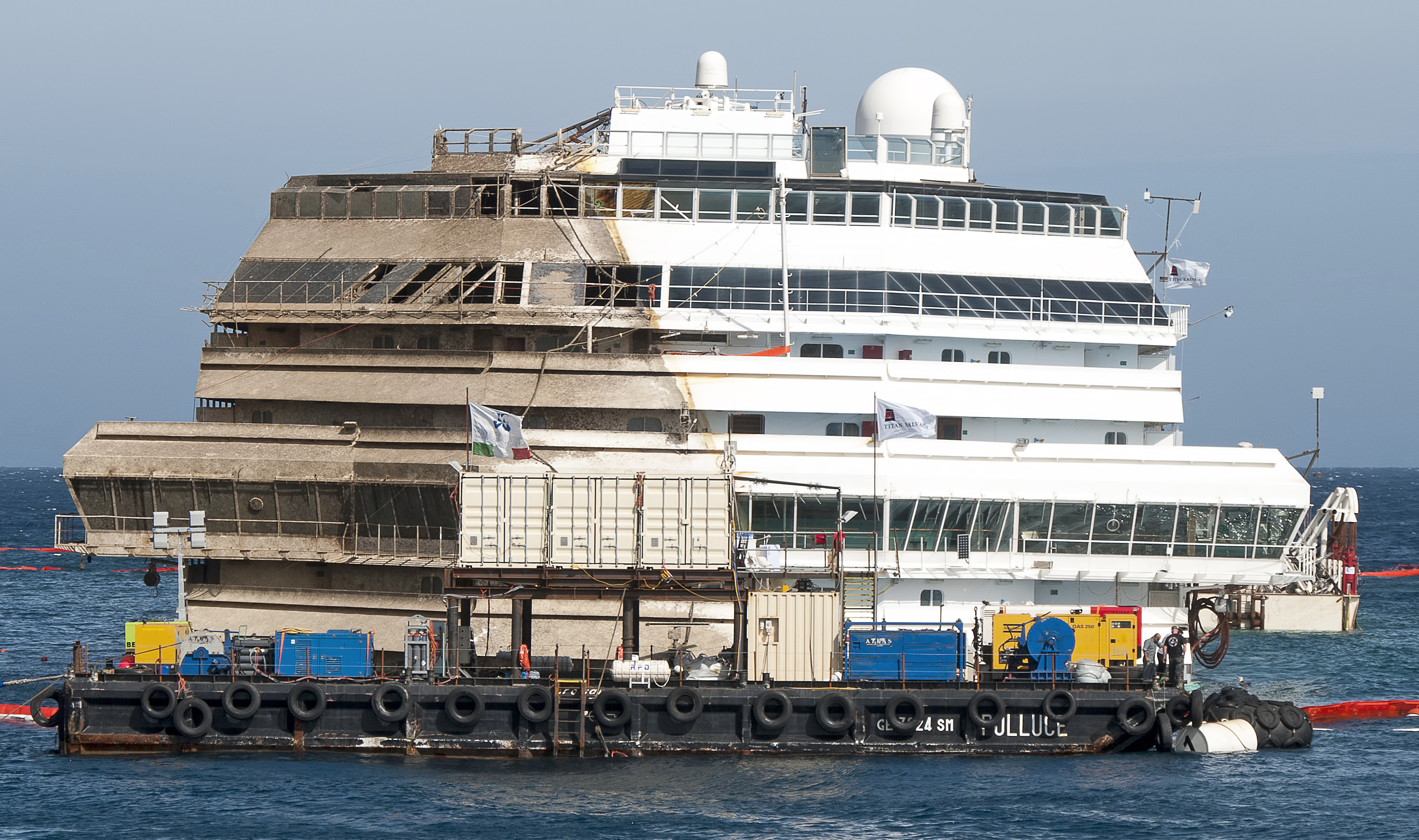
After parbuckling and before refloat, September 2013

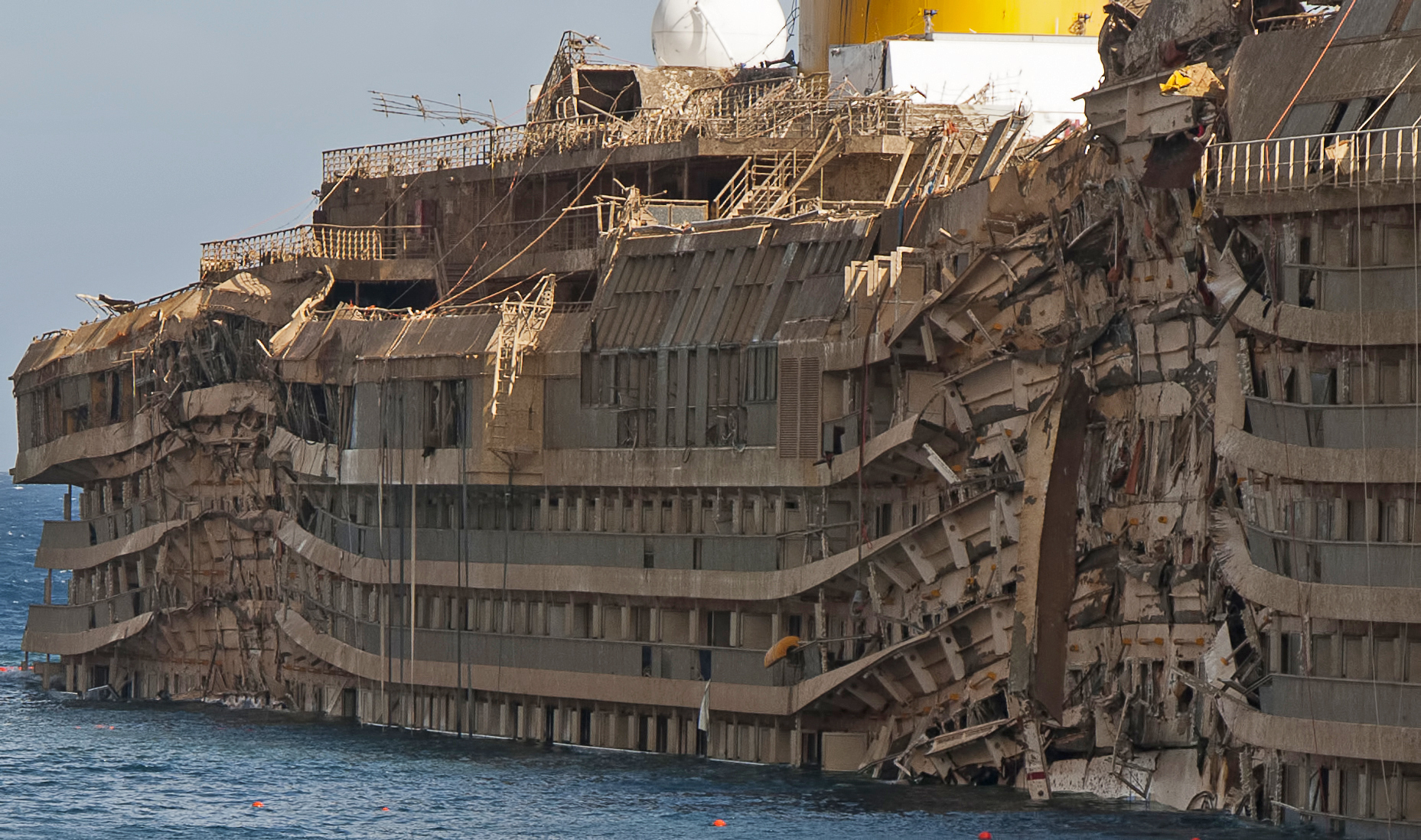
Starboard side of the righted Costa Concordia, showing crush damage from the rock spurs upon which she had rested

==== Refloating and removal ====
Following the conclusion of the righting operation, the ship was kept on the platform while further inspections were made and the starboard sponsons attached. On 10 October 2013 a $30 million option was taken with Dockwise for the use of the world's largest semi-submersible heavy lift vessel, Dockwise Vanguard, to transport Costa Concordia as an alternative to conventional towing, but ultimately Costa Concordia was indeed refloated and towed to Genoa in July 2014.

In December 2013, invitations were issued by Costa to 12 companies to tender for the dismantling of Costa Concordia, in France, Italy, Norway, Turkey and the UK. On 30 June 2014 the Italian Government endorsed Costa's decision to have the vessel dismantled at Genoa by Italian companies Saipem, Mariotti and San Giorgio.

On 1 February 2014 a Spanish diver working on the Costa Concordia wreck died after cutting his leg on a sheet of metal. He was brought to the surface alive by a fellow diver, but later died. This was the only death to occur during the Costa Concordia salvage operation.

On 14 July 2014 salvage operators re-floated Costa Concordia off her submerged platform and towed the ship laterally a short distance from the coast. On 23 July 2014, Costa Concordia began her final journey to the Port of Genoa.

==== Scrapping ====
On 27 July 2014, Costa Concordia arrived in Genoa where it was moored against a wharf that had been specially prepared to receive the vessel for dismantling. On 11 May 2015, Costa Concordia was towed to the Superbacino dock in Genoa to remove the upper decks and superstructure. The last of the sponsons were removed in August 2016 and the hull was taken into Genoa drydock No. 4 on 1 September for final dismantling. Final scrapping of the ship was completed on 7 July 2017, with 53,000 tons of material having been recycled.

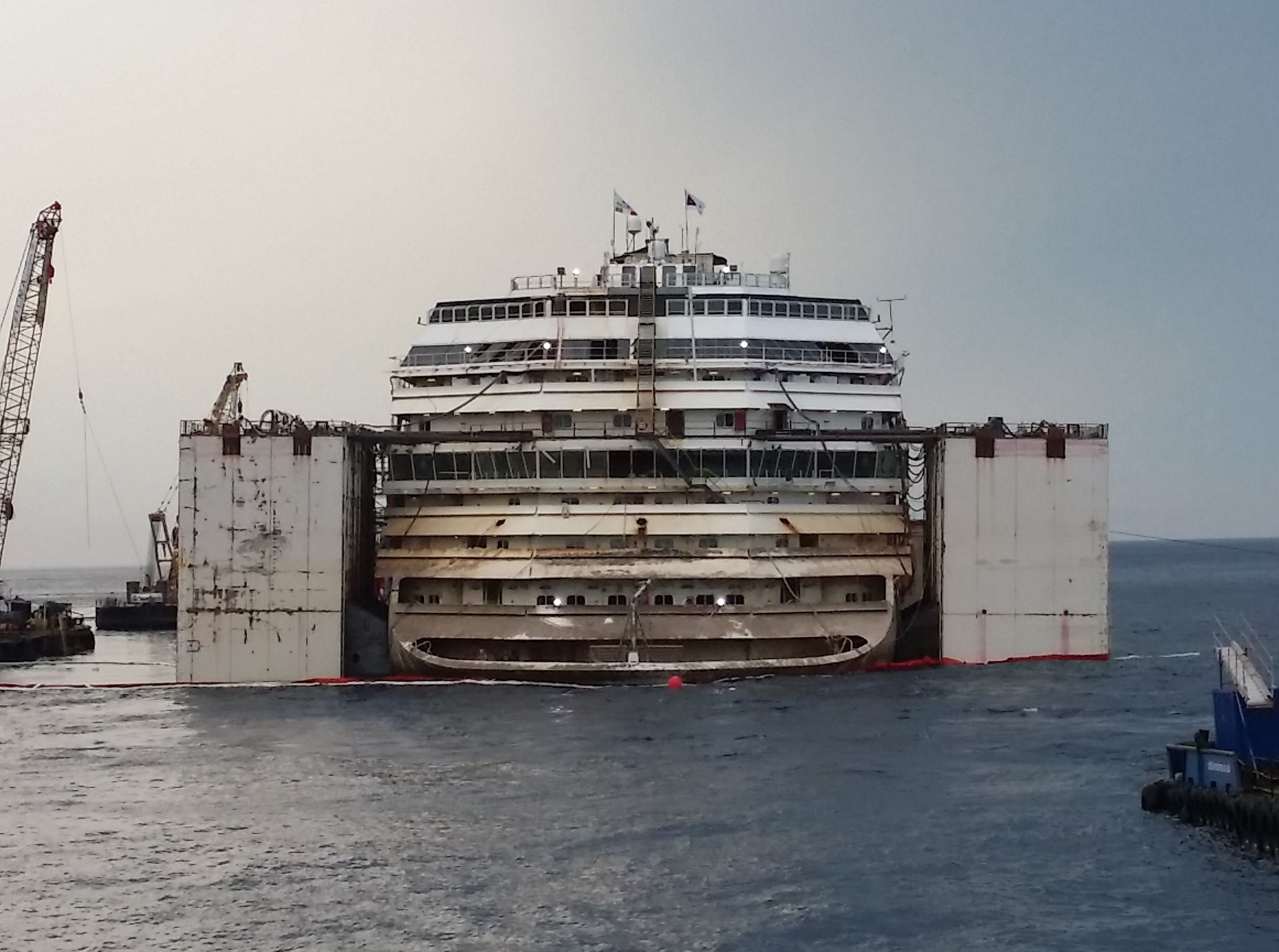
Wreck refloated, 20 July 2014

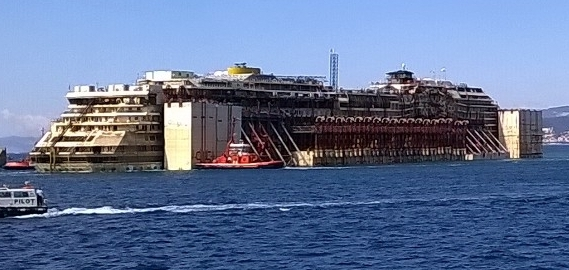
Wreck departing Giglio for Genoa, 23 July 2014

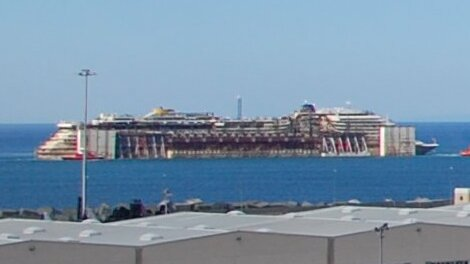
Wreck arriving at Genoa, 27 July 2014

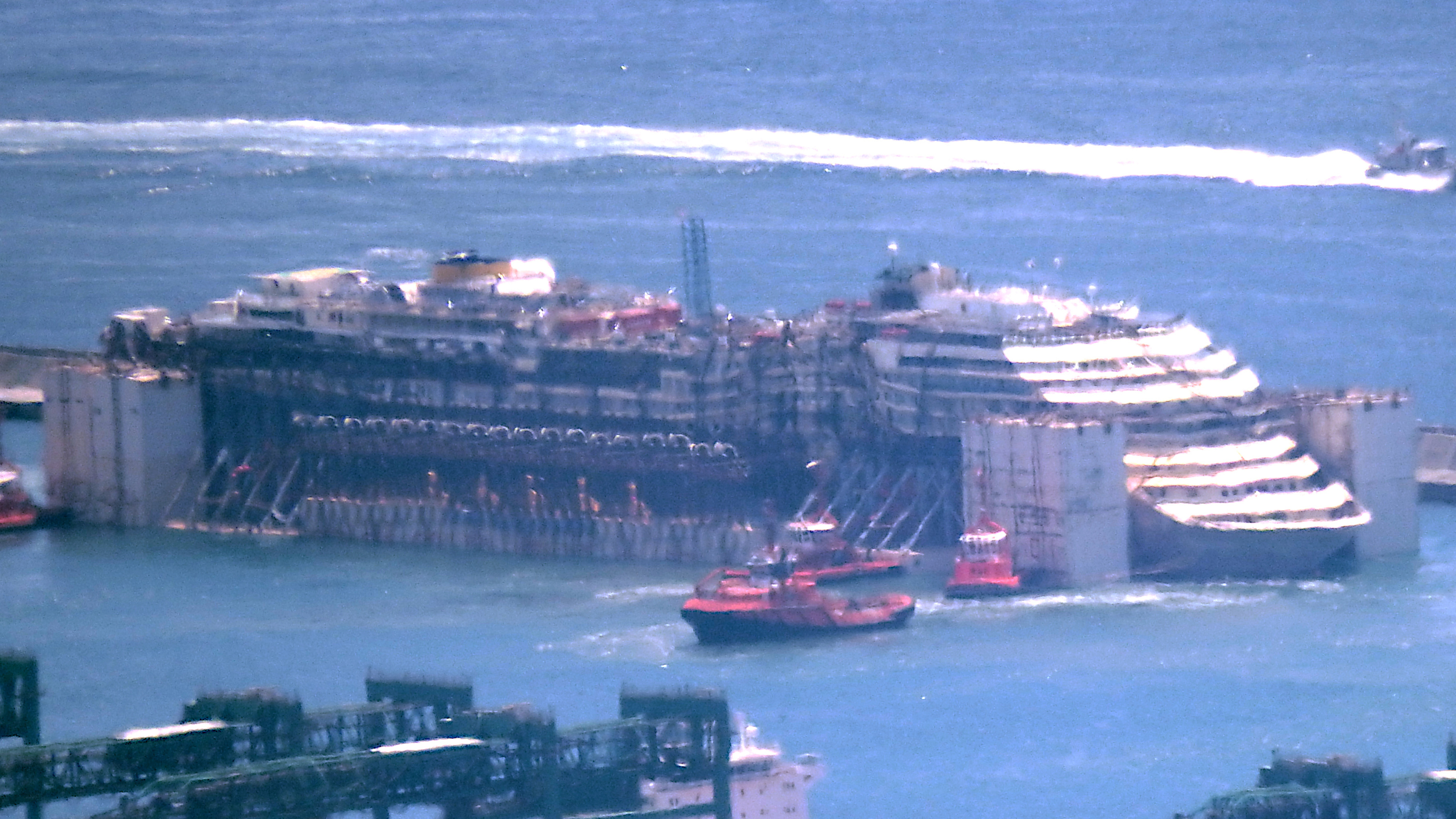
Wreck docked near Genoa, Pegli (Porto di Prà), 27 July 2014

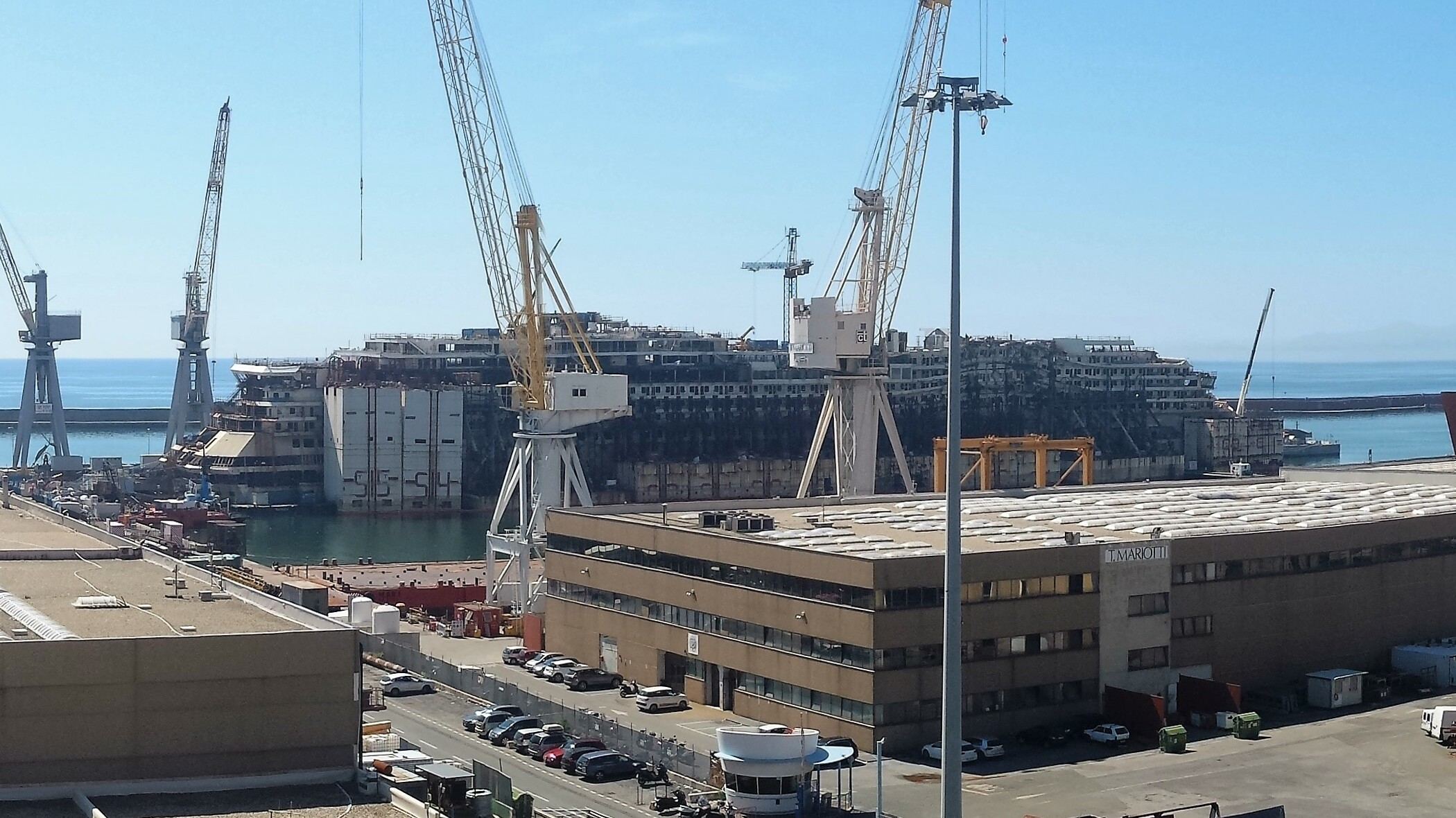
Wreck after being lightened and relocated to the Superbacino dock in Genoa, 28 August 2015

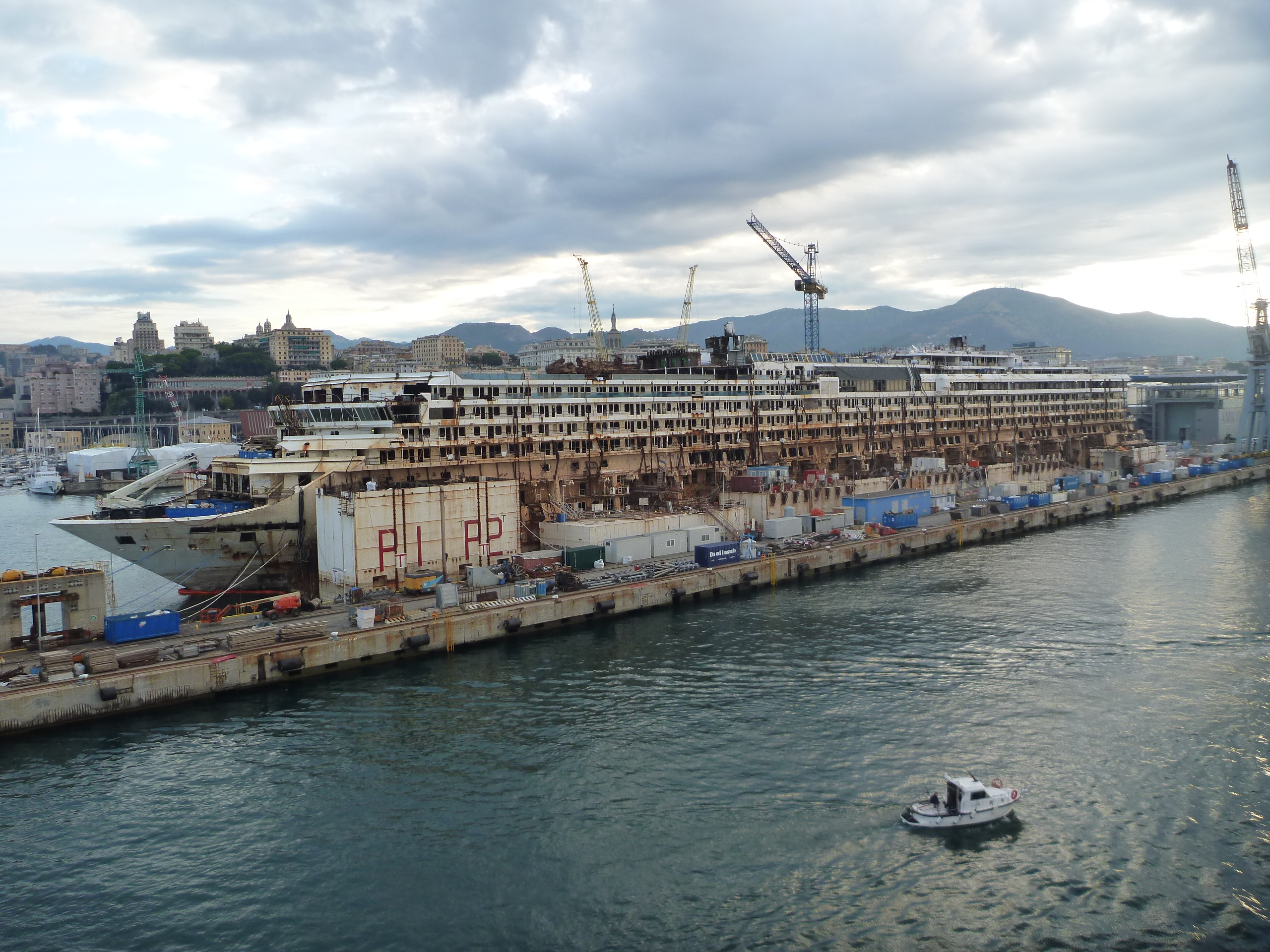
The wreck, with its superstructure being dismantled, in the Superbacino dock in Genoa, 12 September 2015

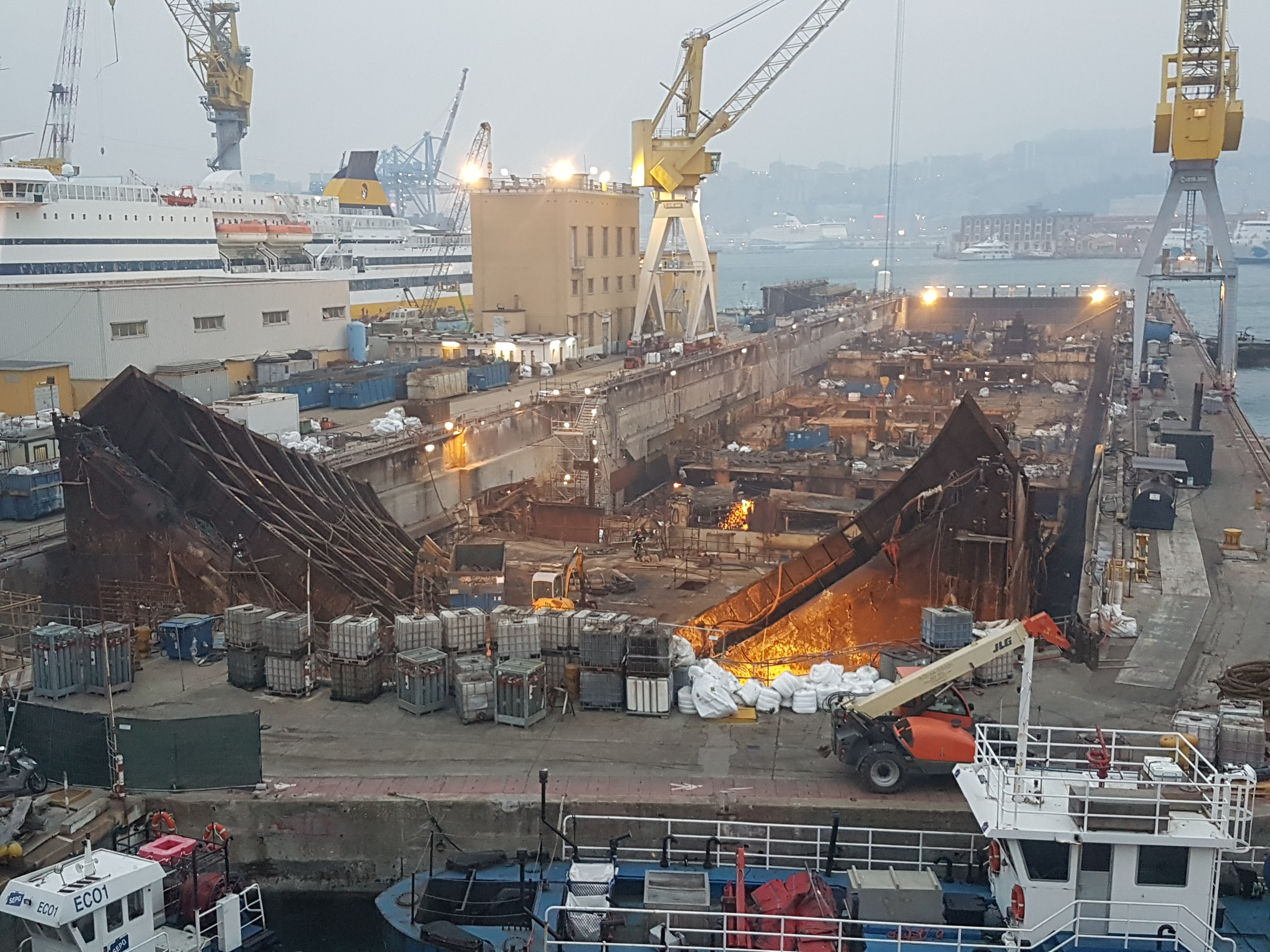
The wreck in its final stage of demolition in drydock No. 4 Genoa, 10 January 2017

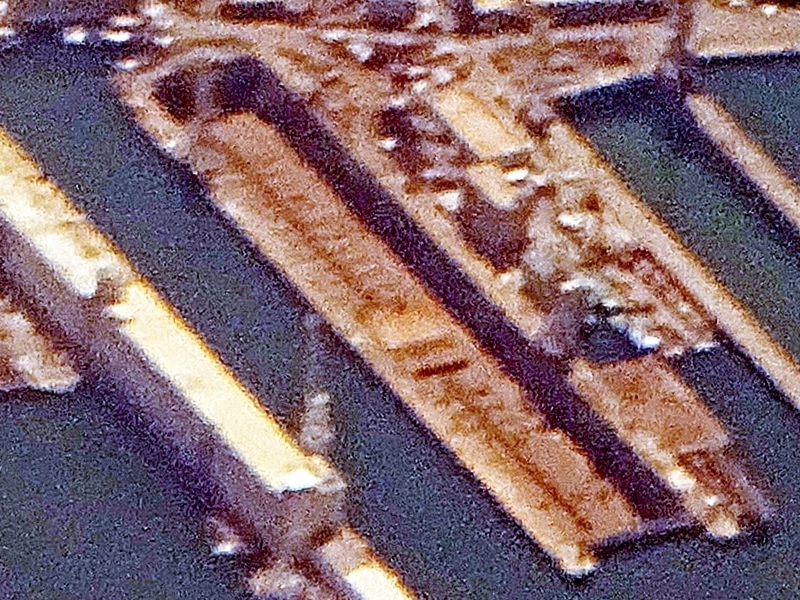
The wreck near the end of its final stage of demolition, with keel visible, in drydock No. 4 Genoa, 10 June 2017

==== Site remediation ====
After the wreck of Costa Concordia was towed away, Costa Crociere put Micoperi in charge of the salvage site remediation. This project is also known as phase WP9. Initially, $85 million was assigned to the project, which was to start at the end of 2014, and take about 15 months for its completion. The main activities included ocean floor cleaning, anchor block removal, grout bag removal, and platform removal. The project continued into May 2018. The entities involved regularly published details of the activity.

=== Ship remnants and artifacts ===
The entirety of Costa Concordia was recycled during her scrapping. The first phase of this effort, which began on 16 October 2014, centered upon the removal of all the furniture and interior structures within the ship, as well as waste found in the secured parts of the ship.

== Loss and compensation ==
=== Passengers and personnel ===
Passenger and crew numbers by nationality
Nationality	Passengers
Italy	989
Germany	569
France	462
Philippines	296
India	202
Spain	177
Indonesia	170
United States	126–129
Croatia	127
Russia	111
Austria	74
Switzerland	69
Brazil	57
Ukraine	45
Japan	43
Netherlands	42
United Kingdom	37
South Korea	34
Hong Kong	26
Australia	21
Argentina	17–18
Taiwan	13
Canada	12
China	12
Poland	12
Dominican Republic	12
Hungary	11
Portugal	11
Chile	10
Colombia	10
Romania	10
Kazakhstan	9
Turkey	9
Bulgaria	8
Peru	8
Belgium	6
Moldova	6
Nepal	6
Sweden	5
Venezuela	5
Denmark	4
Israel	4
Serbia	4
Sri Lanka	4
Belarus	3
Greece	3
Honduras	3
Iran	3
Ireland	3
North Macedonia	3
Albania	2
Algeria	2
Cuba	2
Ecuador	2
Finland	2
Mexico	2
Paraguay	2
South Africa	2
Andorra	1
Bosnia and Herzegovina	1
Czech Republic	1
Lithuania	1
Morocco	1
New Zealand	1
Norway	1
Uruguay	1

Fatalities by nationality
Nationality	Fatalities	
Nationality	Passenger	Crew
Germany	12	0
Italy	6	1
France	6	0
Peru	0	2
United States	2	0
Hungary	0	1
India	0	1
Spain	1	0
Total	27	5

A majority of the passengers on board were Italian, German, or French nationals. The crew consisted of citizens of around 40 countries. Some were Italians (including the captain and all the officers), but 296 Filipinos and 202 Indians made up approximately half of the personnel. Other nationalities include 170 Indonesians, six Brazilians, and an unspecified number of Britons, Chinese, Colombians, Hondurans, Peruvians, Russians, and Spaniards. 32 people are known to have died, and 64 others were injured. Three people (a South Korean newlywed couple and one crewman) trapped inside the ship were rescued more than 24 hours after the accident. The body of the last missing person, Indian crew member Russel Rebello, was recovered on 3 November 2014.

On 27 January 2012, Costa posted the compensation package offered to uninjured passengers on its website. The compensation comprised a payment of €11,000 per person to compensate for all damages (including loss of baggage and property, psychological distress, loss of enjoyment of the cruise) and reimbursement for a range of other costs and losses, including reimbursement for the value of the cruise, for all air and bus travel costs included in the cruise package, for all travel expenses to return home, for all medical expenses arising from the event, and for all expenses incurred on board during the cruise. (Note: After certain emergency disembarkations and other events, the cruise ship operator is required to compensate passengers €10,000 each.)

Costa also promised the return of all property stored in cabin safes, to the extent recoverable, and to grant passengers access to a programme for "psychological assistance". Costa stated that these payments would not be offset against or impact any amount an insurance policy pays to the passenger. The offer to uninjured passengers was effective until 31 March 2012; as to the families of the dead and missing, separate proposals were to be offered "based on their individual circumstances." For a time, Costa permitted its customers to cancel any future cruises booked with them, without penalty. One-third of the passengers accepted the offer of €11,000 compensation. The trade union representing the crew negotiated compensation packages. Crew members were paid wages for a minimum of two months or, if longer, their full contract term. They also received reimbursement for expenses and up to £2,250 for lost personal property.

As well as compensation, survivors of the Concordia disaster have called for safety improvements to be made. A lawyer heading the team representing the victims said that it was "clear that the initial grounding of Costa Concordia could have been avoided and that subsequent failings in carrying out the evacuation process made a very bad situation far worse".

On 23 February 2012, the Environment Ministry announced it would be "taking legal action" against Costa Cruises regarding a "possible" claim for "possible environmental damage" and the cost of salvage.

=== Ship ===
Industry experts believed the ship to be a constructive total loss early on in the salvage efforts, with damages of at least US$500 million. Pier Luigi Foschi, CEO of Costa, told an Italian Senate committee hearing "we believe that the wreck can no longer be put in use". Shares in the Carnival Corporation, the American company that jointly owns (with Carnival plc) Costa Cruises, initially fell by 18% on 16 January 2012 following a statement by the group that the grounding of the ship could cost Carnival Corporation up to US$95 million (€75 million, £62 million). Carnival Corporation later increased the estimated financial impact in fiscal year 2012 to include a reduction in net income of $85-95 million, an estimated insurance excess of an additional $40 million, and $30–40 million in "other incident-related costs".

The insurance excess on the vessel was $30 million (€23.5 million, £19.5 million). The group of cruise lines jointly owned by Carnival Corporation and Carnival plc constitutes 49 percent of the worldwide cruise ship industry and owns 101 ships, of which Costa Concordia represented 1.5% of capacity. Booking volume for Carnival's fleet, excluding Costa, in the 12 post-accident days was down by "the mid-teens" as a percentage of year-earlier bookings.

== Investigations ==
The Italian Marine Casualty Investigation Central Board (Commissione centrale di indagine sui sinistri marittimi, CCISM), a unit of the Corps of the Port Captaincies – Coast Guard, conducts the technical investigations of maritime accidents and incidents within Italian-controlled waters. On 6 February, the International Chamber of Shipping, representing shipowners' associations, called for the "earliest possible publication of the Italian accident investigations". International experts said that it was too early to speculate on why the vessel partially sank despite its watertight compartments but that the size of the vessel is unlikely to have been an issue. Tuscany's prosecutor general said that the investigation would seek to find causes for various aspects of the event, and beyond Schettino to other persons and companies.

By January 2013 the technical investigation report had not yet been released. Lloyd's List said that the casualty investigation board "roundly" received criticism for not having released the investigation yet. The board said the investigation was delayed because the Italian prosecuting team had seized important information, including the voyage recorder.

Judge Valeria Montesarchio summoned survivors to testify at a hearing convened on 3 March in Grosseto. The captain tested negative for drug and alcohol use, but one group that sued Costa Cruises disputed the tests as unreliable. On 24 February 2012, prosecutors alleged that Schettino had "slowed down the ship so that he could finish dinner in peace" and, to compensate for lost time, increased the speed to 16 knots (30 km/h) just before the sail-past.

On 2 February 2012, the prosecutor's office in Paris, France opened a preliminary inquiry to question survivors to establish any criminal liability and "assess psychological damage".

Germany stopped cooperating with Italy in investigating the accident in December 2015 after the Federal Bureau for Maritime Casualty Investigation was prevented from carrying out a proper investigation by Italian public prosecutors and courts.

=== Criminal proceedings against officers ===
Francesco Schettino, who had worked for Costa Cruises for 11 years, and First Officer Ciro Ambrosio were arrested. The captain was detained on suspicion of manslaughter and for violations of the Italian Penal Code and Code of Navigation on three specifications — of his having caused the shipwreck "owing to ... imprudence, negligence and incompetence" resulting in deaths; having abandoned about 300 people "unable to fend for themselves"; and "not having been the last to leave" the shipwreck, but was rather the first, among all passengers and members, to leave. They were questioned on 14 January.

At the validation hearing of 17 January 2012, the Court of Grosseto charged Schettino and Ambrosio with the results from the records of investigation compiled immediately after the event, including the first report of the coast guard of Porto Santo Stefano of 14 January 2012, the summary testimonial information given by the members of the ship's crew, the chronology of events of the Harbour Office of the Port of Livorno, the AIS recording on record, and the PG Annotation of the Harbour Office of the Port of Livorno.

Schettino was released from jail on 17 January but was placed under house arrest. The house arrest order included an "absolute prohibition against going away or communicating by any means with persons other than his cohabitants". On 7 February, the Court decided to continue Schettino's house arrest. On 23 February, two additional charges, of "abandoning incapacitated passengers and failing to inform maritime authorities" were levied against Schettino. His pretrial hearing was scheduled for 20 March. On 5 July 2012, Schettino was released from house arrest but mandated to reside in Meta di Sorrento.

Officials were initially trying to determine why the ship did not issue a mayday and why it was navigating so close to the coast. The delay in the evacuation request was also unexplained.

On 11 February 2012, TG5 broadcast a video of the commotion on the bridge following the impact with the reef. In the video, when one officer said, "Passengers are getting into the lifeboats", Schettino responded "vabbuò" (a Neapolitan colloquialism which stands for "whatever", "fine", or "ok"). The magistrate in charge of the inquiry remarked, "This is new to us—I've just seen it for the first time."

On 19 February, the Associated Press reported that traces of cocaine had been found on Schettino's hair samples, "but not within the hair strands or in his urine—which would have indicated he had used the drug". A 2015 report indicated that the ship had been carrying a large amount of mafia-owned cocaine when it sank, although senior officers were likely not aware it was on board.

On 22 February 2012, four officers who were on board and three managers of Costa Cruises were placed formally "under investigation" and "face charges of manslaughter, causing a shipwreck and failing to communicate with maritime authorities".

=== Recorded evidence ===
One of the ship's voyage data recorders (VDRs), which was designed to float, was recovered. Another, containing different data, was located on 17 January. A third was in a submerged part of the ship, difficult to reach. On 19 January 2012, all the data storage devices from the ship's control panel, including hard disks, were recovered. One of the hard disks contained videos from cameras located near the control board, which were expected to reveal the movements of the ship's captain and officers. The chief prosecutor received from the Guardia di Finanza a video, taken from their patrol boat, that filmed the ship between 22:30 and 23:10 or at 23:20.

On 3 March 2012, in Grosseto, judges began a hearing open to all survivors, other "injured parties", and their lawyers, but closed to the general public and media. Four specialists were ordered to review the VDR data and relate their conclusions at a 21 July 2012 hearing. Prosecutor Francesco Verusio had stated that it could take "a month, two months, three months" for evidence analysis, including of recorded conversations on the bridge, to be completed. The hearing also determined who could "attach lawsuits to the case". Inhabitants of Giglio and some environmental groups were denied this ability.

=== Trials ===
On 20 July 2013, five people were found guilty of manslaughter, negligence and wrecking: Roberto Ferrarini (the company's crisis director) received the longest sentence of those five at two years and 10 months, followed by Manrico Giampedroni (the cabin service director) at two and a half years. Three crew members—first officer Ciro Ambrosio, helmsman Jacob Rusli Bin and third officer Silvia Coronica—were given sentences between one and two years. Ferrarini, who was not on the ship, was convicted of understating the extent of the disaster and delaying an adequate response. Giampedroni, the hotel director, was convicted for his role in the evacuation, which was described as chaotic. The helmsman Bin was convicted for steering the ship in the wrong direction after Schettino ordered a corrective manoeuvre.

Reuters cited judicial sources as saying that none of these individuals would be likely to go to jail, as sentences shorter than two years for non-violent offences are routinely suspended in Italy, and longer sentences can be appealed or replaced by community service. Lawyers for the victims declared the sentences as shameful and said they might appeal to overturn the plea bargains that allowed reduced sentences in return for guilty pleas. The company Costa Cruises avoided a trial in April by agreeing to a €1 million fine. Ultimately, none of the five officers were jailed because their sentences were suspended.

In a separate trial for manslaughter and causing the loss of the ship, Captain Francesco Schettino sought a plea bargain agreement. When his trial resumed in October 2013, Domnica Cemortan (a 26-year-old Moldovan) admitted having been Schettino's lover and having been a non-paying passenger on the ship, after the prosecution alleged that her presence on the bridge "generated confusion and distraction for the captain". Schettino testified that the catastrophic crash would have been avoided if helmsman Jacob Rusli Bin had not waited 13 seconds to execute a turn. However, this was disputed by an expert who said that, while the Indonesian crew member had made a mistake, it made little difference to the outcome. Rusli Bin failed to appear in court in March 2014 to give evidence and was thought to be somewhere in Indonesia. Roberto Ferrarini told the court in April that "Schettino asked me to tell the maritime authorities that the collision was due to a blackout on the ship. But I strongly objected." Passengers told the court in May that if they had followed the officers' orders to return to their cabins, they would have drowned. In February 2015, Schettino was convicted and sentenced to 16 years in prison. Schettino appealed against the sentence, which was initially upheld in May 2016, then finally in May 2017. He is serving his sentence in Rebibbia Prison, Rome.

== Reactions ==
=== Costa Cruises and its parent companies ===
Costa Crociere S.p.A. also does business using the name "Costa Cruises". Costa Cruises is jointly owned by a dual-listed company comprising the two separate companies Carnival Corporation and Carnival plc. Carnival Corporation announced on 30 January 2012 that its board of directors would engage outside consultants in various disciplines, including emergency response, organisation, training and implementation, to conduct a comprehensive review of the accident and the company's procedures. Costa Cruises initially offered to pay Schettino's legal costs, but decided later that they would not do so.

After the vessel was determined to be a constructive total loss and would need to be scrapped, Costa Cruises ordered a replacement vessel from Fincantieri, the same shipyard that built the Costa Concordia and her sister ships. The new vessel was named the Costa Diadema and cost US$739 million to build. Costa Diadema was launched in November 2013 and entered service for Costa in November 2014.

=== Regulatory and industry response ===
Corrado Clini, Italy's Minister of Environment, said that sail-by salutes, a "custom that has resulted in an outcome visible to all", should no longer be tolerated. On 23 January 2012, UNESCO asked Italy to reroute cruise ships to avoid sailing too close to "culturally and ecologically important areas", and on 1 March, Italy excluded large ships from sailing closer than 2 miles (3 km) from marine parks.

The European Maritime Safety Agency was in the process of conducting a review of maritime safety when the accident occurred. On 24 January 2012, Transport Commissioner Siim Kallas told the Transportation Committee of the European Parliament that lessons learned from the loss of Costa Concordia would be taken into account. British MEP Jacqueline Foster warned against "trial by television and trial by newspapers", a view that was backed by fellow British MEP Brian Simpson, who said that it was "good practice to wait for the official report".

On 18 January 2012, the Chairman of the United States House Committee on Transportation and Infrastructure announced that it would hold a hearing, conducted jointly with the committee's Maritime Transportation Subcommittee, to "review the events of this specific incident, current safety measures and training requirements". Testimony and statements at the 29 February hearing primarily promoted North American cruise ships as being safe.

The Cruise Lines International Association (CLIA), the European Cruise Council (ECC) and the Passenger Shipping Association adopted a new policy requiring all embarking passengers to participate in muster drills before departure. On 29 January 2012, at Fort Lauderdale, Florida, Holland America Line made one passenger disembark from the cruise ship MS Westerdam for "non-compliance" during a mandatory muster drill. On 24 April, the CLIA and the ECC introduced new policies: bridge officers must agree on the route before departing; ships must carry more lifejackets; and access to the bridge must be limited.

In an action some parliamentarians said was a reaction to the wrecking of Costa Concordia, the Italian government withdrew proposed legislation that would have reduced current restrictions on mineral exploration and production. On 8 July 2012, CNN reported that the disaster changed the cruise industry's safety and evacuation procedures. Carnival, the parent line of Costa, and several other cruise lines now require safety instruction, referred to as muster drills, before leaving port. The new muster policy consists of 12 specific emergency instructions, which include providing information on when and how to don a life jacket, where to muster and what to expect if there is an evacuation of the ship.

=== Media ===
Coverage of the shipwreck dominated international media in the days after the disaster. The New York Times called the incident "a drama that seemed to blend tragedy with elements of farce". Phillip Knightley called it the "most significant event in modern maritime history" because "every single safety procedure designed to make sea travel safe failed miserably".

The parbuckling was a major media operation, and the righting was well-documented in video and photographs. News Agencies Getty Images and Associated Press had an extensive coverage, from the day of the disaster to the removal of the wreck with the photographers Laura Lezza, Marco Secchi and Andrew Medichini documenting and capturing all phases.

In 2014, National Geographic produced a documentary called The Raising of the Costa Concordia about the raising and salvaging of the ship.

In 2014, the Smithsonian Channel broadcast Cruise Ship Down: Saving Concordia, detailing the efforts to right the Costa Concordia before it collapsed under its own weight.

On July 10, 2026, Netflix released Shipwrecked: Nightmare at Sea, a documentary that includes firsthand accounts and audio and video from the incident. https://www.imdb.com/title/tt43595399/

==== In Italy ====
Newspaper Corriere della Sera stated that Italy owed the world a "convincing explanation" for the wreck and called for harsh punishment of those found responsible. Il Giornale said the wreck was a "global disaster for Italy". Il Messaggero said there was "anguish over those still missing". La Repubblica called the event "a night of errors and lies". La Stampa criticised the captain for not raising the alarm and refusing to go back on board the ship.

Italian commentators reflected on the contrast between Schettino and de Falco (the on-duty Italian Coast Guard) and what it said about the national character. They represented "the two souls of Italy", according to Aldo Grasso in Corriere della Sera. "On the one hand a man hopelessly lost, a coward who shirks his responsibility as a man and an officer, indelibly stained. The other grasps the seriousness of the situation immediately and tries to remind the first of his obligations."

Some saw parallels between the incident and the country's recent political upheavals. "To see someone that in a moment of difficulty maintains steady nerves is consoling because that is what we need", another Corriere della Sera columnist, Beppe Severgnini, told The New York Times. "Italy wants to have steady nerves because we've already done the cabaret route".

De Falco's exasperated order to Schettino, "Vada a bordo, cazzo!" ("Get the fuck on board!", or "Get back on board, you prick!"), became a catchphrase in Italy. T-shirts with the phrase were soon printed and sold across the country. It has also been used on Twitter and Facebook.

== Honours and memorial ==
In September 2012, recognising the best navigation and merchant marine professionals, Lloyd's of London awarded the title of Seafarers of the Year to the Costa Concordia crew for their exemplary behaviour during the shipwreck which saved most of the ship's passengers. In January 2013, the municipalities of Isola del Giglio and Monte Argentario were decorated with the highest Italian Civil award: the Gold Medal of Civil Merit granted by the president of the republic for the commitment of citizens, administrators and local institutions in the rescue of the survivors of the ship Costa Concordia.

The mayor of Giglio, Sergio Ortelli, and Costa Cruises agreed that a large boulder that was wedged in the hull would be removed from the side of the vessel and be positioned on the island as a memorial to the 32 people who lost their lives. Ortelli anticipated the boulder would "most likely" be positioned "close to the harbour entrance so that visitors and locals can see it clearly and pay their respects to the victims. What happened that night is something Giglio will never forget and the rock will be a fitting memorial." The cost of removing the 80-tonne boulder was estimated at £40,000.

== Safety regulations ==
Like all passenger ships, Costa Concordia was subject to two major International Maritime Organization requirements: to perform "musters of the passengers (...) within 24 hours after their embarkation" and to be able to launch "survival craft" sufficient for "the total number of persons aboard ... within a period of 30 minutes from the time the abandon-ship signal is given". Passenger ships must be equipped with lifeboats for 125% of the ship's passenger and crew maximum capacity, among which at least 37.5% of that capacity on each side of the ship (75% of total) must consist of hard lifeboats as opposed to inflatable ones. Launching systems must enable the lowering of the lifeboats under 20° of list and 10° of pitch.

According to Costa Cruises, its internal regulations require all crew members to complete Basic Safety Training, and to perform a ship evacuation drill every two weeks. Every week, all the lifeboats on one side of the ship are launched for a test. Under the regulations in force in 2006 when Costa Concordia was delivered, the ship had to be designed to survive the flooding of two adjacent compartments caused by an 11-metre (36 ft) breach. The damage caused by impact with the rocks left a 36.5-metre tear (120 ft) in the hull.

== See also ==
- Lists of shipwrecks
- List of maritime disasters
- Carnival Triumph
- Sea Diamond
- SS Jeddah
- The Ballad of the Costa Concordia
