= Gregorio de Falco =

Italian naval officer and politician

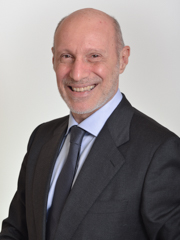
- Official portrait, 2018

Member of the Senate of the Republic
- In office 23 March 2018 – 13 October 2022
- Constituency: Tuscany

Personal details
- Born: Gregorio Maria de Falco; 8 March 1965 (age 61) Naples, Italy
- Party: M5S (2018); Independent (2018–20); A/+E (2020–21); Europeanists (2021); CD (2021–)
- Education: University of Milan
- Profession: Naval officer

Military service
- Allegiance: Italy
- Branch/service: Italian Navy
- Rank: Ship-of-the-line captain (Captain)
- Unit: Corps of the Port Captaincies – Coast Guard

Gregorio Maria de Falco (born 8 March 1965) is an Italian naval officer and politician who was formerly a member of the Italian Senate. He is best known for his career in the Italian Navy, which saw his intervention in the attempt to solve the Costa Concordia disaster in January 2012.

== Early life and education ==
After graduating in law at the University of Milan, de Falco joined the Corps of the Port Captaincies in Livorno in 1994, studying at the Naval Academy.

== Career ==
In 2000, de Falco left Livorno and joined the Captaincy in Genoa.

With the rank of lieutenant, de Falco was assigned the command in Santa Margherita Ligure, where he stood from 2003 to 2005.

=== Costa Concordia disaster ===
On 13 January 2012, the Costa Concordia cruise ship, owned by the Costa Crociere shipping company and under the command of Francesco Schettino, impacted a rock in the waters of Giglio Island, opening a 53-meter-long (174 ft) hole on the port side, followed by the partial submersion of the ship.

De Falco, who led the captaincy in Livorno, assumed the coordination of the rescues to the cruise unit in difficulty. During the radio and telephone communications between the operating room of the Livorno captaincy and the Costa Concordia, de Falco repeatedly ordered Schettino, who had abandoned ship, to return to the vessel and take charge of the ongoing passenger evacuation. De Falco's exasperated order Vada a bordo, cazzo! ("Get back on board, you prick!" or "Get the fuck [back] on board!") became very popular.

=== Political career ===
De Falco ran for a seat in the Italian Senate with the Five Star Movement in the 2018 general election and was elected.

He was a member of the left wing of the party and is considered to be very close to the president of the Chamber of Deputies Roberto Fico. On 31 December 2018, De Falco was expelled from the party after being accused of having violated its code of ethics several times. In an interview, he declared that he was expelled for voting against the decree "Decreto sicurezza", and accused the Five Star Movement of lacking democracy and freedom of choice.
