= Nick Sloane =

South African engineer (born 1961)

Nicholas Sloane (born 5 July 1961 in Kitwe, Zambia) is an engineer who works in marine salvage.

He is best known for leading the salvage operation of the wrecked Costa Concordia in September 2013. The ship had collided with rocks near Isola del Giglio, Tuscany in January 2012, and had been around for 20 months before its successful salvage. The salvage was preceded by 16 months of preparatory work, and took a total of 19 hours to complete. In 2015 Sloane won the German Sea Prize for this salvage action.

Sloane has worked on plans to tow an iceberg from the Antarctic Ocean to Cape Town in South Africa.
