= Sail-by salute =

Bringing a ship close to shore to salute those on land

A sail-by salute (or near-shore salute) is a salute performed by bringing a ship close to shore to salute those on land. Often the salute is performed for a crewmember's family. The practice dates back to ancient times. In Italy, massive ships regularly came very close to shorelines or jetties in the Mediterranean, including the island of Procida, off the Amalfi coast, and Sicily.

Some US-based cruise lines have been reluctant to answer questions pertaining to the extent to which salutes are performed today. Passenger ship historian and writer Peter Knego says that salutes are still performed whether approved by cruise companies or not.

== History ==
Shipboard salutes, both from ship to shore and between two ships, have a long history, especially by Greek and Italian mariners in the Mediterranean.

=== Costa Concordia disaster ===
The custom of sail-by salutes was brought to mainstream focus following the 2012 Costa Concordia disaster in which the Italian cruise ship Costa Concordia hit an underwater rock near Isola del Giglio, Italy.

In the case of the Costa Concordia disaster, there is controversy about whether the captain's on-shore superiors had ordered such a salute or had anything to do with it at all. Costa Cruises chief executive Pier Luigi Foschi told a newspaper that the owners of the ship were not aware of "unsafe practices involving ships coming close to shore to give tourists a better view" but also acknowledged and defended the practice in a testimony before an Italian parliamentary committee where he said that sail-by salutes do happen with cruise line approval, calling them "tourist navigations" whereby cruise ships steer close to shore to give passengers a look at the sights, something Foschi said "enriches the cruise product". He also said that "There are many components of the cruise product, and we have to do them like everyone else because we are in a global competition."

Italian environmentalists and some politicians demanded that big cruise ships be banned from passing too close to islands or shorelines, or entering delicate areas such as the Venetian lagoon.

== See also ==
- SOLAS Convention
- Ship's Salute
