= Costa Concordia =

Cruise ship that ran aground in a 2012 maritime accident

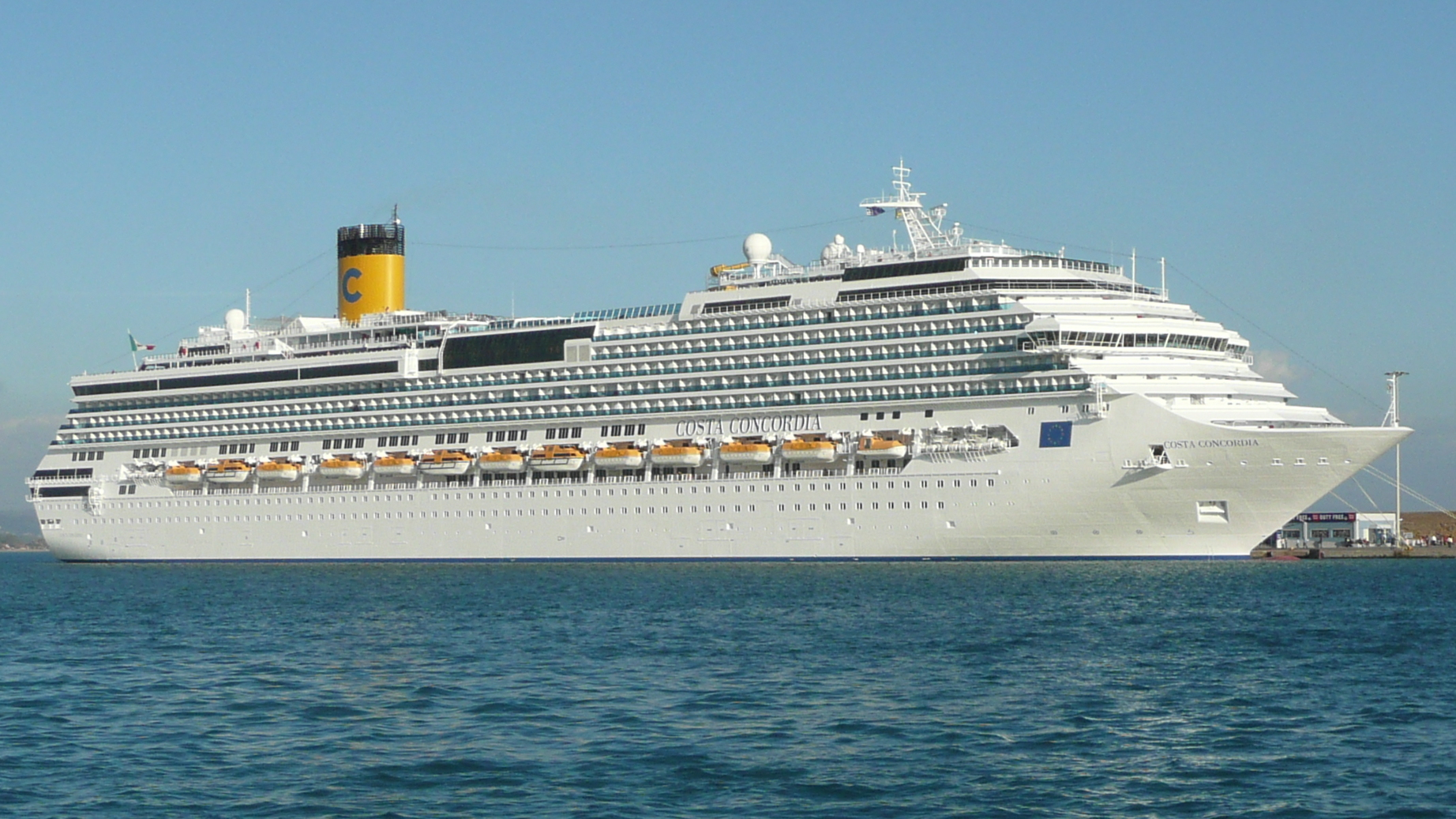
- Costa Concordia in January 2008

History

Italy
- Name: Costa Concordia
- Owner: Carnival Corporation & plc
- Operator: Costa Crociere
- Port of registry: Genoa, Italy
- Route: Western Mediterranean
- Ordered: 19 January 2004
- Builder: Fincantieri Sestri Ponente, Italy
- Cost: €450 million (£372 million, US$570 million)
- Yard number: 6122
- Way number: 543
- Laid down: 8 November 2004
- Launched: 2 September 2005
- Sponsored by: Eva Herzigová
- Christened: 7 July 2006
- Acquired: 29 June 2006
- Maiden voyage: 14 July 2006
- In service: July 2006
- Out of service: 13 January 2012
- Identification: Call sign: IBHD; IMO number: 9320544; MMSI number: 247158500
- Fate: Capsized and partially sank in 2012 off Isola del Giglio, Tuscany. Salvaged in 2014 and subsequently scrapped in Genoa, Italy in 2017.

General characteristics
- Class & type: Concordia-class cruise ship
- Tonnage: 114,147 GT
- Length: 290.20 m (952 ft 1 in) (overall); 247.4 m (811 ft 8 in) (between perpendiculars)
- Beam: 35.50 m (116 ft 6 in)
- Draught: 8.20 m (26 ft 11 in)
- Depth: 14.18 m (46 ft 6 in)
- Decks: 13
- Installed power: 6 × Wärtsilä 12V46C; 76,640 kW (102,780 hp) (combined)
- Propulsion: Diesel-electric; two shafts; Alstom propulsion motors (2 × 21 MW); Two fixed-pitch propellers
- Speed: 19.6 knots (36 km/h; 23 mph) (service); 23 knots (43 km/h; 26 mph) (maximum)
- Capacity: 3,780 passengers
- Crew: 1,100

Costa Concordia (Italian pronunciation: [ˈkɔsta koŋˈkɔrdja]) was a cruise ship operated by the Italian cruise line Costa Crociere. She was the first of her class, followed by her sister ships Costa Serena, Costa Pacifica, Costa Favolosa and Costa Fascinosa, and Carnival Splendor built for Carnival Cruise Line. When the 114,137-ton Costa Concordia and her sister ships entered service, they were among the largest ships built in Italy until the construction of the 130,000 GT Dream-class cruise ships.

On 13 January 2012 at 21:45, Costa Concordia struck a rock in the Tyrrhenian Sea just off the eastern shore of Isola del Giglio. This tore open a 53-metre (174-foot) gash on the port side of her hull, which soon flooded parts of the engine room, cutting off power from the engines and ship services. As water flooded in, the ship listed as she drifted back towards the island and grounded near shore, then rolled onto her starboard side, lying in an unsteady position on a rocky underwater ledge.

The evacuation of Costa Concordia took over six hours, and of the 3,229 passengers and 1,023 crew known to have been aboard, 32 died. Francesco Schettino, the ship's captain at that time, was tried and found guilty of manslaughter, causing a maritime accident, and abandoning his ship. He was sentenced to sixteen years in prison in 2015. After starting serving his term in 2017, he was released in 2026. The wreck was salvaged three years after the incident and then towed to the port of Genoa, where she was scrapped.

== Concept and construction ==
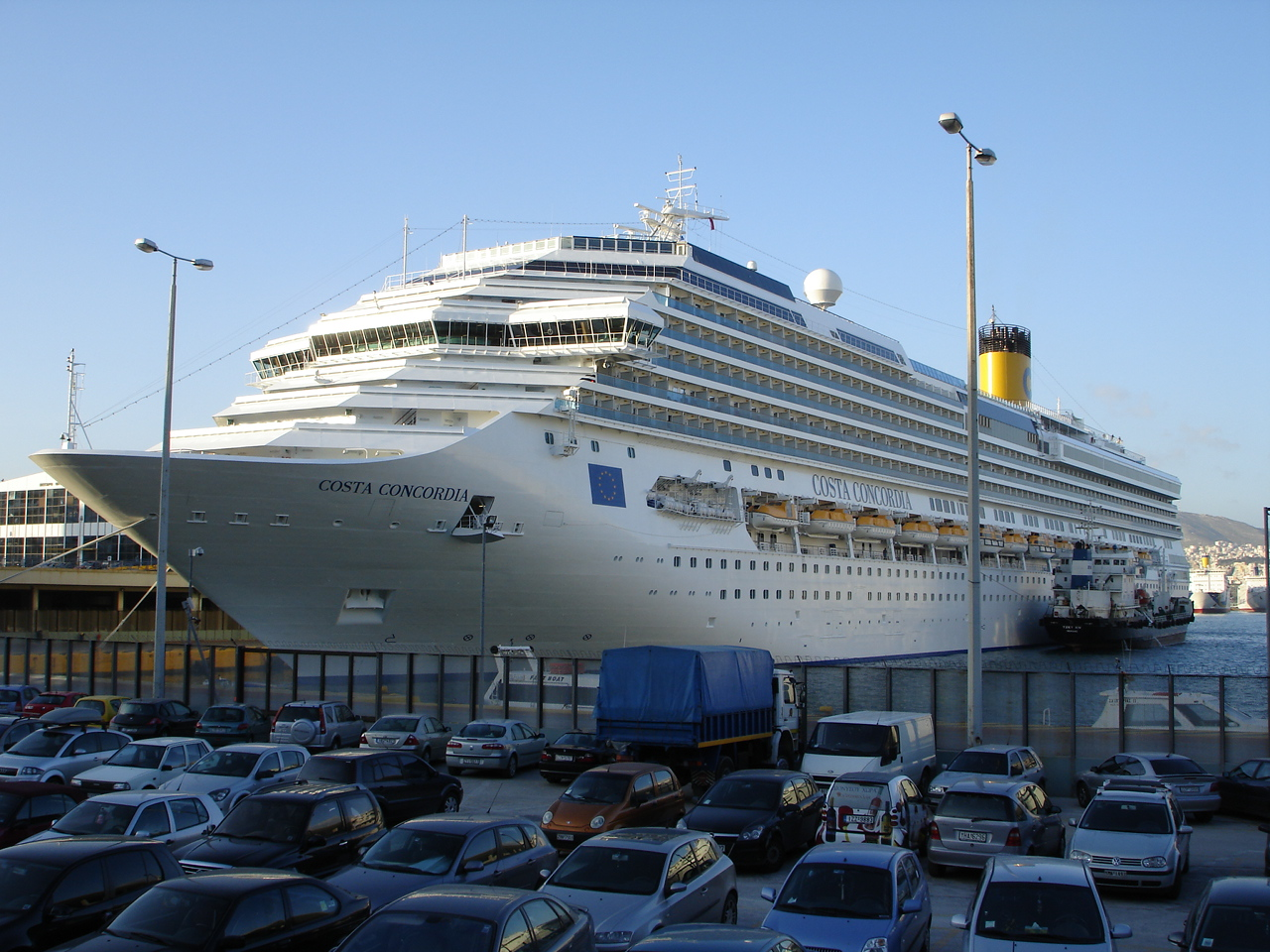
Costa Concordia in Piraeus, Greece, November 2006

Costa Concordia was ordered in 2004 by Carnival Corporation from Fincantieri and built in the Sestri Ponente yard in Genoa, as yard number 6122. At the vessel's launch at Sestri Ponente on 2 September 2005, the champagne bottle, released by model Eva Herzigová, failed to break when swung against the hull the first time. This type of occurrence is considered a bad omen among seafarers, and this incident has been partially blamed for the ship's 2008 accident and 2012 sinking.

The ship was delivered to Costa on 30 June 2006. It cost €450 million (£372 million, US$570 million) to build. The name Concordia was intended to express the wish for "continuing harmony, unity, and peace between European nations".

== Description ==
Costa Concordia was 290.20 metres (952 feet 1 inch) long, had a beam of 35.50 m (116 ft 6 in) and drew 8.20 m (26 ft 11 in) of water. She had a diesel-electric power plant consisting of six 12-cylinder Wärtsilä 12V46C four-stroke medium-speed diesel generating sets with a combined output of 76.6 megawatts (102,780 horsepower). These main generators provided power for all shipboard consumers from propulsion motors to hotel functions such as lighting and air conditioning. The ship was propelled by two 21-megawatt electric motors coupled to fixed-pitch propellers. Her design service speed was 19.6 knots (36.3 kilometres per hour; 22.6 miles per hour), but during sea trials, she achieved a speed of 23 knots (43 km/h; 26 mph).

== Layout ==
Costa Concordia had 13 public decks, each named after a European country. Deck 1 was the lowest:

- Deck 1 Olanda (Holland)
- Deck 2 Svezia (Sweden)
- Deck 3 Belgio (Belgium)
- Deck 4 Grecia (Greece)
- Deck 5 Italia (Italy)
- Deck 6 Gran Bretagna (Great Britain)
- Deck 7 Irlanda (Ireland)
- Deck 8 Portogallo (Portugal)
- Deck 9 Francia (France)
- Deck 10 Germania (Germany)
- Deck 11 Spagna (Spain)
- Deck 12 Austria (Austria)
- Deck 14 Polonia (Poland)

== Amenities ==
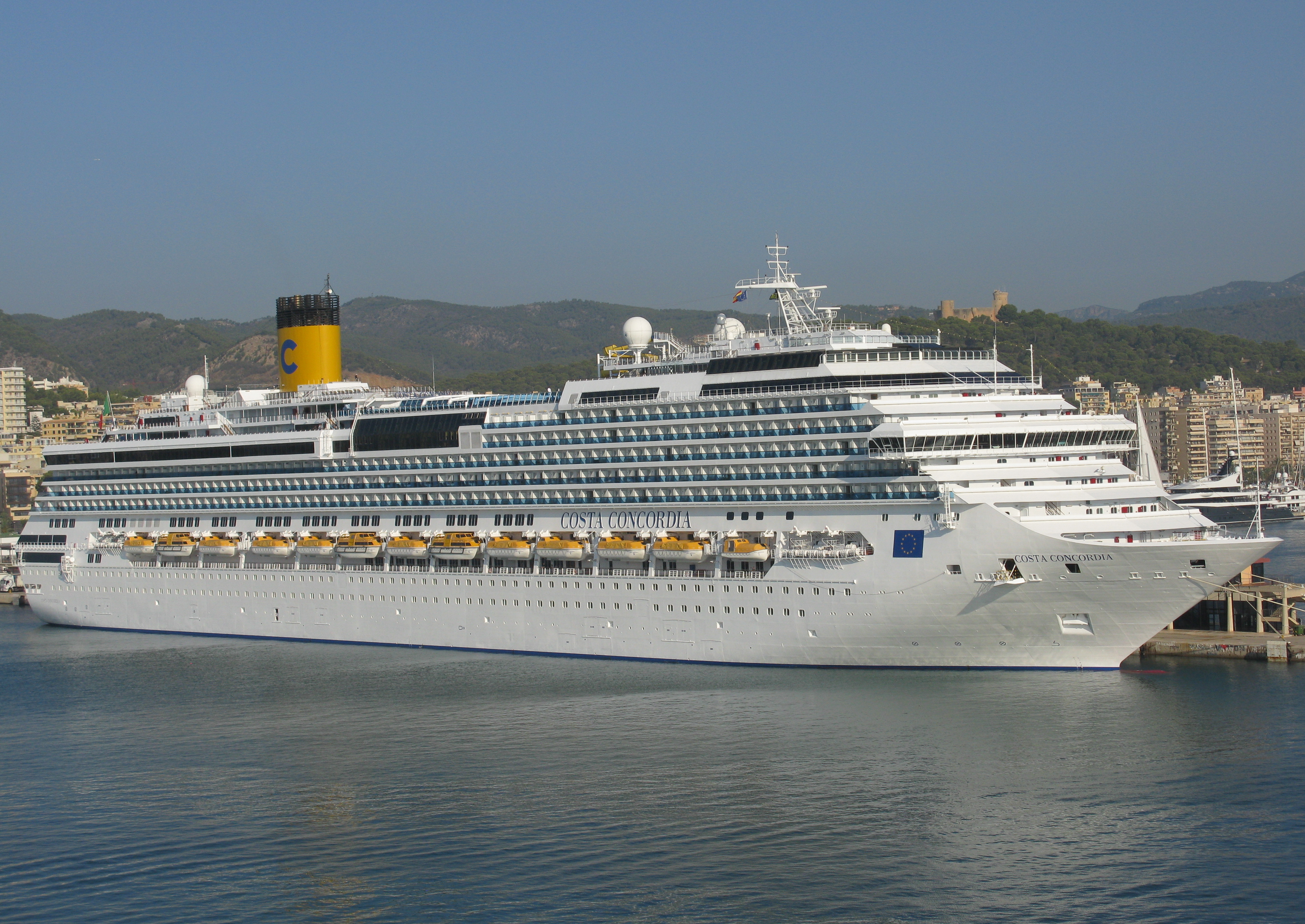
Costa Concordia in Palma de Mallorca, September 2011

Costa Concordia was outfitted with approximately 1,500 cabins; 505 with private balconies, and 55 with direct access to the Samsara Spa, which were considered Spa staterooms; 58 suites had private balconies and 12 had direct access to the spa. Costa Concordia had one of the world's largest exercise facility areas at sea, the Samsara Spa, a two-level, 6,000-square-metre (64,600-square-foot) fitness center, with gym, a thalassotherapy pool, sauna, steam room, and a solarium. The ship had four swimming pools, two with retractable roofs, five Jacuzzis, five spas, and a poolside movie theatre on the main pool deck. There were also five on-board restaurants, with Club Concordia and Samsara taking reservations-only dining. There were thirteen bars, including a cigar and cognac bar and a coffee and chocolate bar. Entertainment options included a three-level theatre, casino, a futuristic disco, a children's area equipped with video games and a basketball court. She also had on board a Grand Prix motor racing simulator and an internet café.

== Accidents and incidents ==
=== 2008 bow damage ===
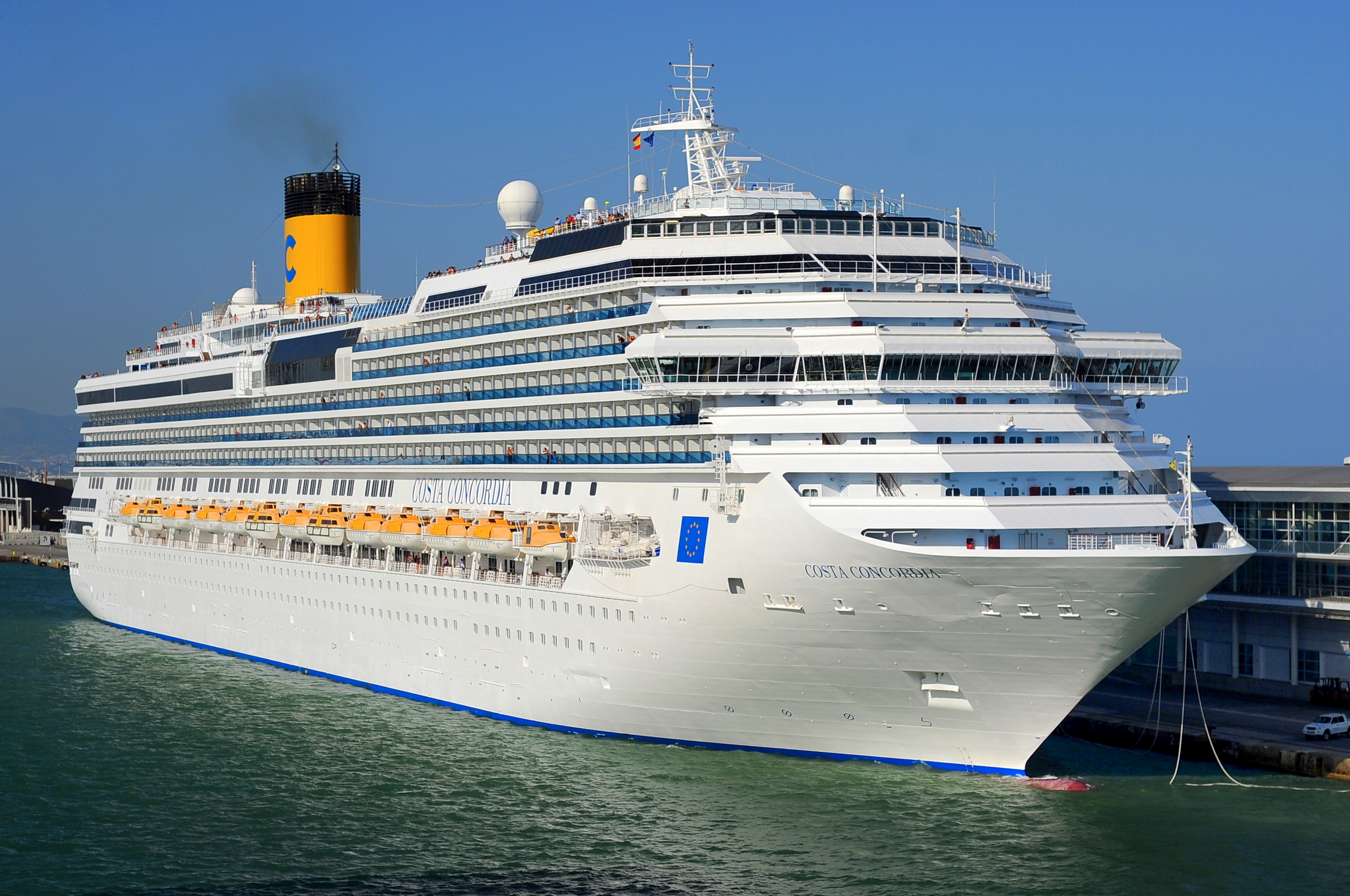
Costa Concordia in July 2009, featuring the initial repairs to her bow.

On 22 November 2008, Costa Concordia suffered damage to her bow when high winds over the Sicilian city of Palermo pushed the ship against its dock. There were no injuries and repairs started soon after. Initial repairs were completed by the December following the incident, but dents were still visible. The area was later fully repaired in 2011 during the ship's refurbishment.

=== 2012 grounding and partial sinking ===
On 13 January 2012, under the command of Captain Francesco Schettino, Costa Concordia departed Civitavecchia, the port that serves Rome, Italy, for a seven-night cruise. At 21:45 local time (UTC+1), in calm seas and overcast weather, she collided with a rock off Isola del Giglio, on the western coast of Italy approximately 54 nautical miles (100 km; 62 mi) northwest of Rome. A 53-metre (174 ft) long gash was made in the port-side hull, along three compartments of the engine room (deck 0). This resulted in loss of propulsion and loss of electrical systems, which crippled the ship. Taking on water, the vessel listed to the starboard (right) side. Twenty-four minutes later, strong winds pushed the vessel back to Giglio Island, where she grounded 500 metres (550 yards) north of the village of Giglio Porto, resting on her starboard side in shallow waters, with most of her starboard side underwater.

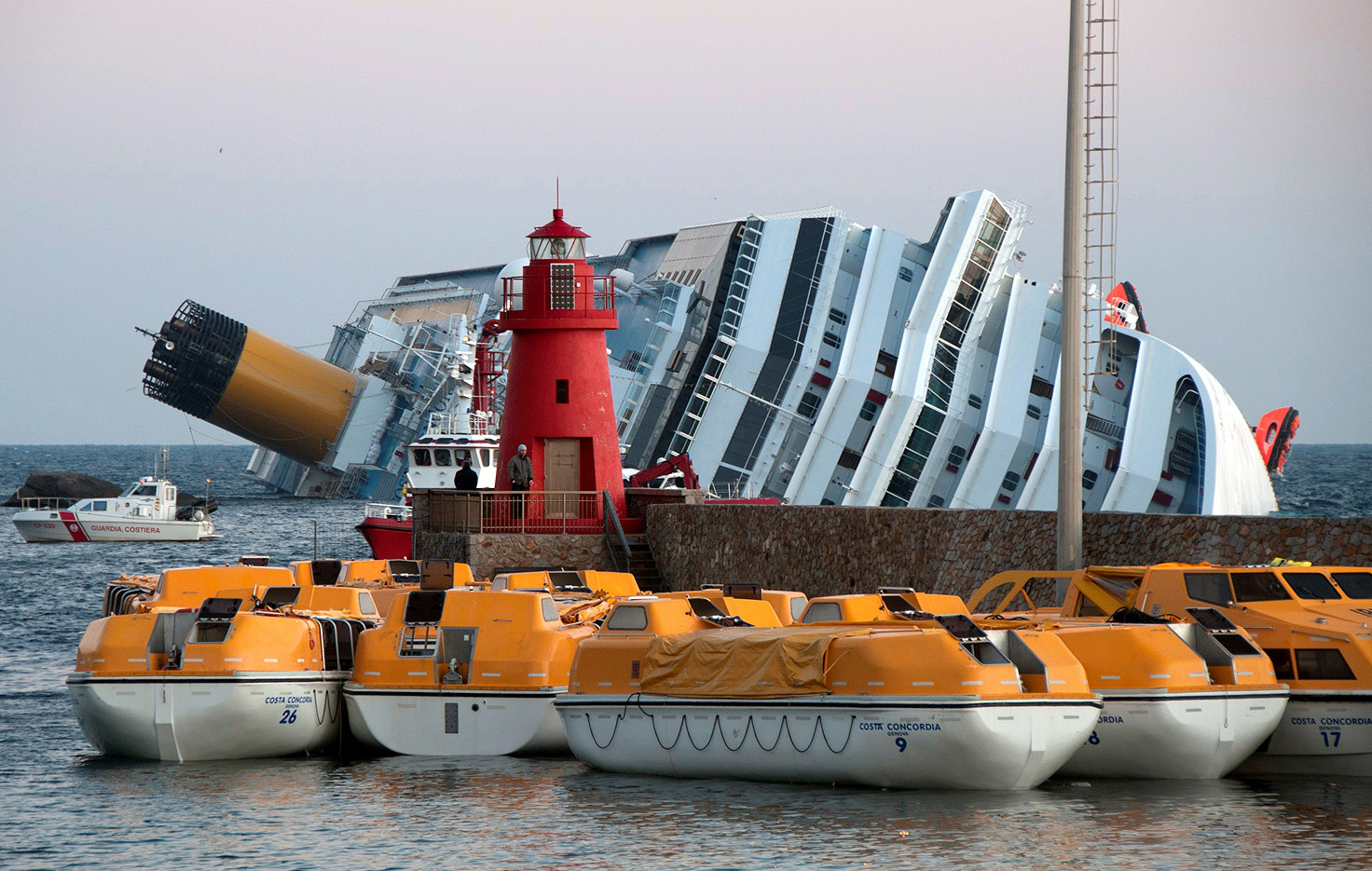
Costa Concordia after dawn with lifeboats at shore

Almost half of the ship remained above water, but it was in danger of sinking completely into a trough 70 metres (230 ft) deep. Despite the gradual sinking of the ship, its complete loss of power, and its proximity to shore in calm seas, an order to abandon ship was not issued until over an hour after the initial impact. Although international maritime law requires all passengers to be evacuated within 30 minutes of an order to abandon ship, the evacuation of Costa Concordia took over six hours. At the time, she was carrying 3,206 passengers and 1,023 crew members. The accident resulted in 32 fatalities. The body of the last missing person, Indian crew member Russel Rebello, was recovered on 3 November 2014. It appears that Rebello died while saving other passengers.

Schettino was found guilty of manslaughter, causing a maritime accident, and abandoning his ship. He was sentenced to sixteen years in prison in 2015.

==== Salvage ====
An initial assessment by salvage expert company Smit International estimated that the removal of Costa Concordia and her 2,380 tonnes of fuel could take up to 10 months. Smit advised that the ship had been damaged beyond the hope of economic repair and recommended it be written off as a constructive total loss. Smit was soon contracted to initially remove only Concordia's fuel.

During the fuel removal operation, Smit reported that the ship had shifted 60 centimetres (24 in) in the three weeks since her grounding, but that there was no immediate prospect of her breaking up or sinking deeper. Removal of the fuel from the various fuel tanks distributed throughout the ship was completed in March 2012, later than Smit's initial estimates. This cleared the way to arrange for the ultimate salvaging and scrapping of the ship.

On 17 September 2013, Costa Concordia was brought to a vertical position through a parbuckling procedure. The cost for salvaging the ship increased to $799 million. In addition, the ship had suffered severe hull deformations in two places. Titan Salvage, the company directing the salvage operations, estimated that the next phase of the salvage operation would be completed by early-to-mid-2014. After this "floating" operation, the ship would be towed to a salvage yard on the Italian mainland for scrapping or "breaking".

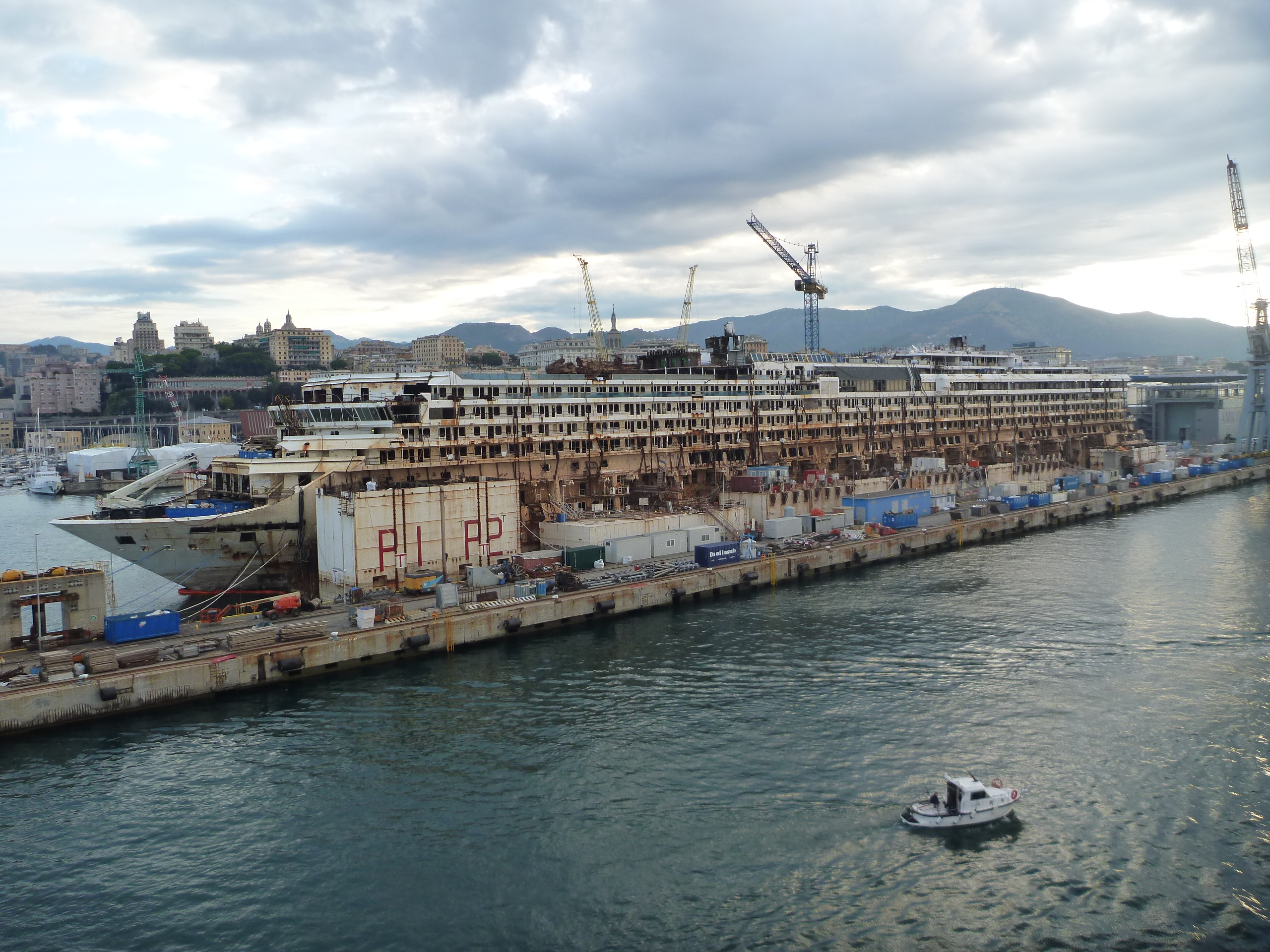
Costa Concordia on 12 September 2015, being scrapped in the Superbacino dock in Genoa, Italy

On 14 July 2014, work commenced to refloat Costa Concordia in preparation for towing. At this point, the costs had risen to €1 billion. Including tow cost, €100 million for the ship to be broken up for scrap and the cost of repairing damage to Giglio island, the estimated final cost was expected to be €1.5 billion ($2 billion). On 23 July, having been refloated, the ship commenced its final journey under tow at a speed of 2 knots (3.7 km/h; 2.3 mph), with a 14-ship escort, to be scrapped in Genoa. It arrived at port on 27 July, after a four-day journey. It was moored to a seawall at the port, awaiting dismantling processes.

On 11 May 2015, following initial dismantling, but still kept afloat by the salvage sponsons, the hull was towed 10 miles (16 km) to the Superbacino dock in Genoa for removal of the upper decks. The last of the sponsons were removed in August 2016 and the hull was taken in to a drydock on 1 September for final dismantling. Scrapping of the ship was completed on 7 July 2017.

== Aftermath ==
On 11 April 2012, a documentary broadcast in the United Kingdom, titled Terror at Sea: The Sinking of the Costa Concordia, and another first broadcast on Channel 4, titled The Sinking of the Concordia: Caught on Camera, featured footage recorded by the passengers and crew.

On 14 July 2012, a documentary titled Cruise Ship Disaster: Inside the Concordia, was first broadcast on the Discovery Channel, CNN Presents: Cruise to Disaster, first broadcast by CNN and another, titled Inside Costa Concordia: Voices of Disaster, was first broadcast by the National Geographic Channel. The season 39 Nova episode "Why Ships Sink" discusses the sinking of Costa Concordia. A later Nova season 42 episode "Sunken Ship Rescue" featured the salvage effort and race to refloat and remove the badly damaged Costa Concordia from the accident scene before the ship could break apart, risking an environmental catastrophe.

On 15 February 2013, ABC's 20/20 aired a special on the sinking and interviews with the survivors following the engine fire on Carnival Triumph.

On 1 September 2025, NBC's Survival Mode aired a special on the sinking of the Costa Concordia. The episode featured interviews and footage recorded inside the vessel as it struck the sea floor and began taking on water. The special included a detailed reconstruction of events and firsthand accounts from survivors and rescue personnel.

On 10 July 2026, the Netflix documentary Shipwrecked: Nightmare at Sea featured interviews, videos, and recounts from several survivors of the sinking of Costa Concordia. It also explored the actions of Franceso Schettino, and the accountability of the cruise ship company, Carnival Corporation.

Captain Schettino was released after serving nine and a half years out of his sixteen year sentence, in 2026.

== See also ==
- Costa Concordia disaster
- Socialisme
- The Great Beauty
- Teens Of Denial
