= Costa Serena =

Concordia-class cruise ship

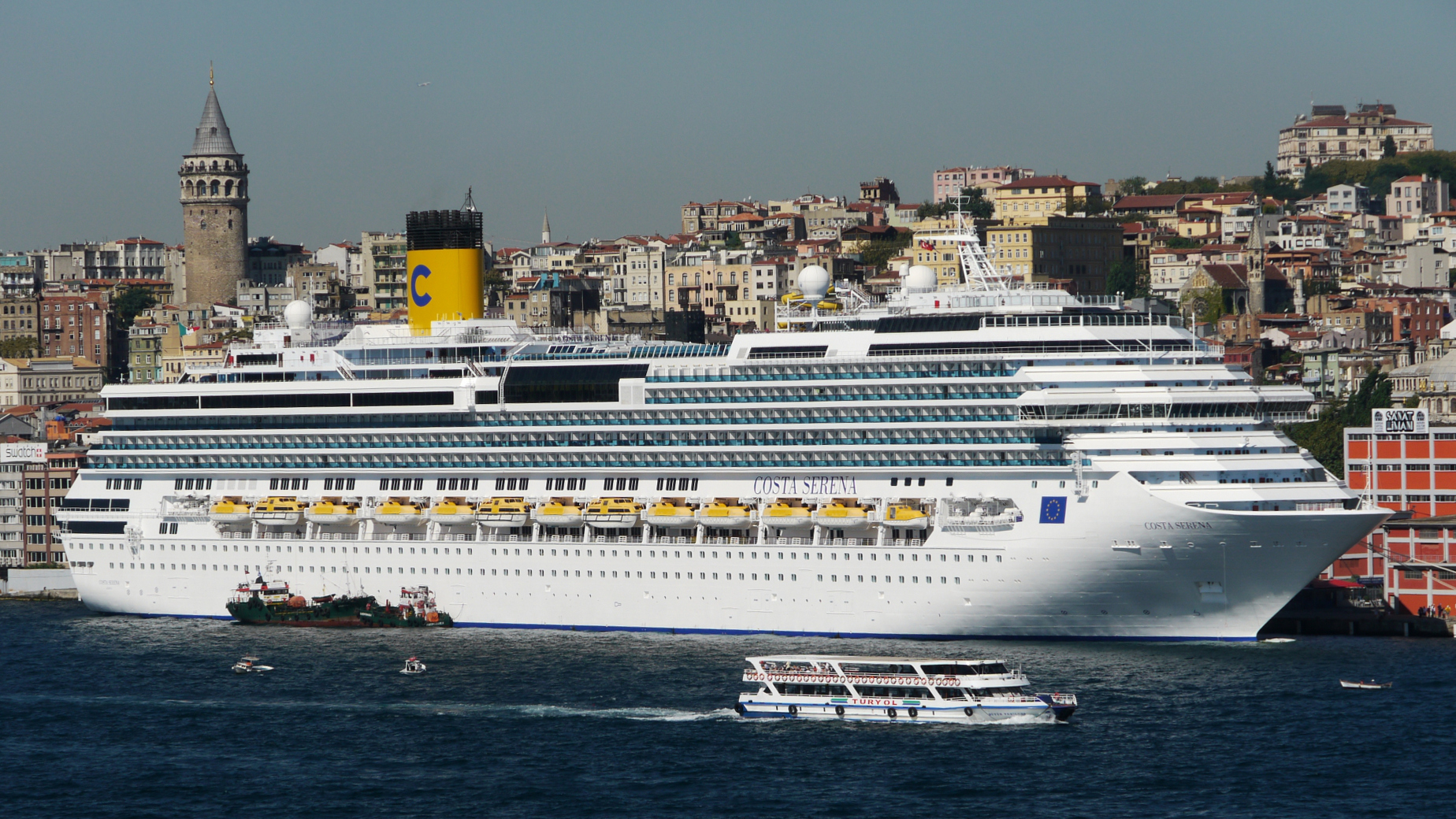
- Costa Serena at Istanbul in 2010

History
- Name: Costa Serena
- Owner: Carnival Corporation & plc
- Operator: Costa Crociere
- Port of registry: Italy, Genoa
- Ordered: 1 October 2004
- Cost: €450 million (£372 million, US$570 million)
- Yard number: 6130
- Laid down: 1 February 2005
- Launched: 4 August 2006
- Completed: 9 March 2007
- In service: 2007–present
- Identification: Call sign: ICAZ; IMO number: 9343132; MMSI number: 247187600
- Status: In service

General characteristics
- Class & type: Concordia-class cruise ship
- Tonnage: 114,147 GT; 87,196 NT; 10,000 DWT
- Length: 289.59 m (950 ft 1 in)
- Beam: 35.5 m (116 ft 6 in)
- Draught: 8.30 m (27 ft 3 in)
- Depth: 14.18 m (46 ft 6 in)
- Deck clearance: 2,908 mm (114.5 in)
- Propulsion: Two shafts; fixed-pitch propellers
- Speed: 20 knots (37 km/h; 23 mph)
- Capacity: 3,700 passengers
- Crew: 1,100

Costa Serena is a Concordia-class cruise ship for the Italian cruise line, Costa Crociere. The name Serena was intended to symbolize harmony and serenity.

Costa Serena was constructed by Fincantieri at Sestri Ponente. She had an older sister ship, Costa Concordia, launched in 2005. The ship, along with her three active sisters, was the largest and longest in the Costa Crociere fleet until being surpassed by the Costa Diadema in 2014. Two sister ships Costa Pacifica and Costa Favolosa were launched in 2009 and 2011 with Costa Fascinosa launched in 2012. Costa Serena's godmother is Marion Cotillard. She is the oldest surviving ship of Concordia class after the Costa Concordia disaster.

== Construction and career ==
19 May 2007 marked the day of Costa Serena's inaugural event. The event was held in Marseille, France, and featured fireworks and a laser show. At the same time as the actual inauguration, Costa held an inaugural event in the virtual world of Second Life.

In 2015, she re-positioned to Shanghai to sail year-round cruises from China visiting ports in Japan and South Korea. These sailings are catered for Chinese guests and are only bookable through Chinese travel agencies. Costa Serena currently sails in Asia Shanghai year-round from various homeports, ranging from Malaysia, Taiwan, Hong Kong and South Korea.

=== 2020 COVID-19 outbreak ===
Fifteen passengers aboard Costa Serena on 24 January were suspected to have SARS-CoV-2. The ship arrived at its destination, Tianjin, China, on 25 January. Quarantine officials boarded the ship to screen all passengers and crew member, and found 17 people with fever. All tests returned negative later that day, and everyone was ordered to disembark and have their photographs and temperatures taken as an additional precaution.

=== 2023 ship restarting ===
Chartered for the entire 2023/2024 season, Costa Serena set sail from the port of Leam Chabang for a series of 4/5 day cruises, before moving on to Japan and South Korea in June 2023, offering a series of short cruises dedicated to the local market.

Costa Serena was scheduled to debut in the Indian market on November 4, 2023, and was then the largest ship in Indian waters.

On 15 September 2026, she docked at Nagoya to act as temporary accommodation for up to 5,000 participants in the Asian Games hosted by Japan.

== In popular culture ==
In 2007 Costa Serena was used for the setting of the movie Natale in Crociera.

In 2009 Costa Serena and her crew was featured in the six-episode National Geographic Channel documentary series Cruise Ship Diaries.
