= Concordia-class cruise ship =

Class of Costa Cruise Line cruise ships

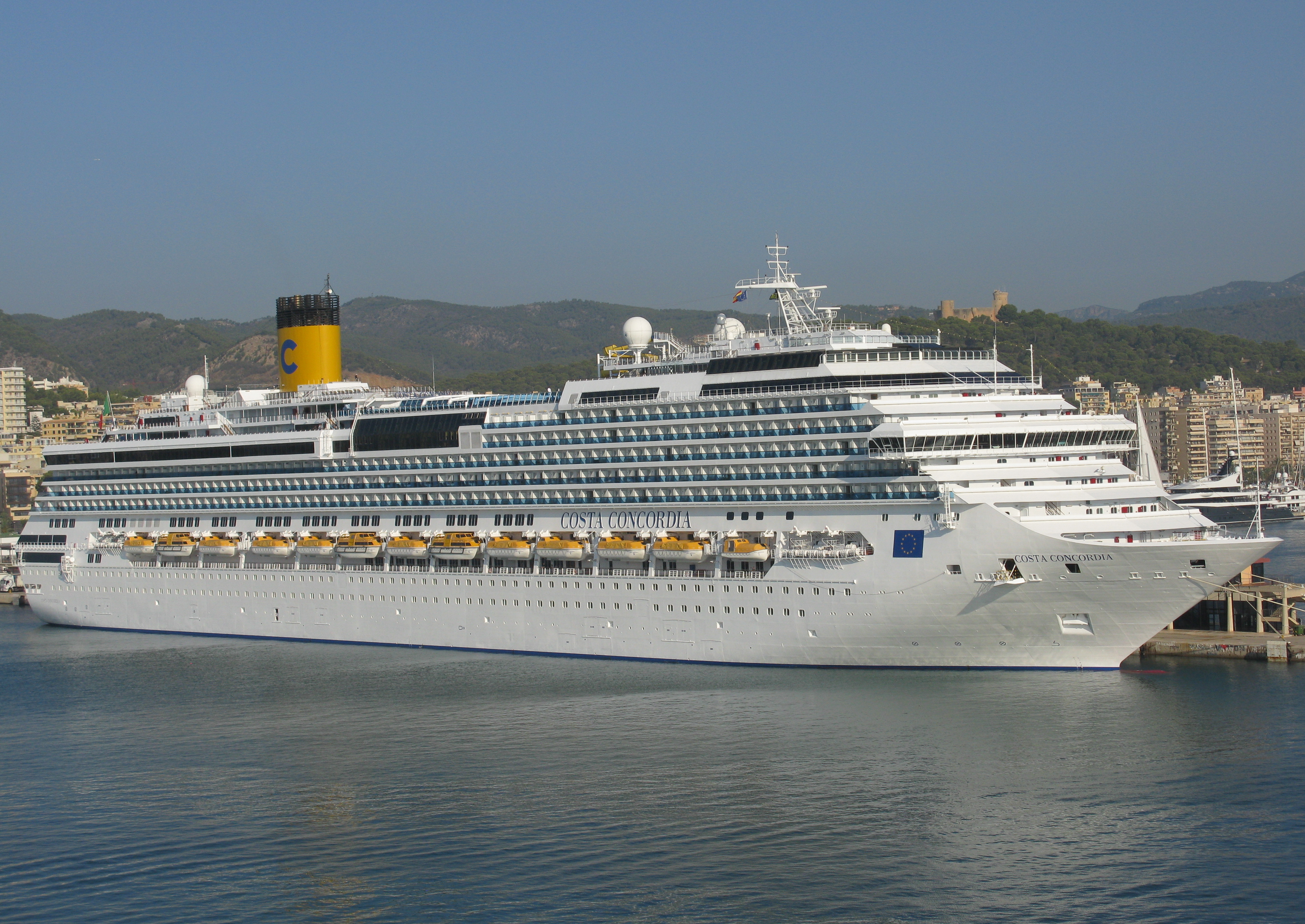
- Costa Concordia

Class overview
- Builders: Fincantieri
- Operators: Costa Cruises; Carnival Cruise Line
- Preceded by: Costa Cruises: Destiny class; Carnival Cruise Line: Conquest class
- Succeeded by: Dream class
- Built: 2006–2012
- In service: 2006–present
- Planned: 8
- Completed: 6
- Active: 5
- Lost: 1

General characteristics
- Type: Cruise ship
- Tonnage: 113,300– GT
- Length: 952 ft (290.2 m)
- Beam: 116 ft (35.4 m)
- Decks: 24
- Installed power: 76,640 kW (102,780 hp)
- Propulsion: Diesel-electric; two shafts Alstom propulsion motors (2 × 21 MW) Two fixed pitch propellers
- Speed: 22 kn (41 km/h; 25 mph)
- Capacity: 3,006 passengers
- Crew: 1,600

The Concordia class is a class of cruise ships that are operated by Costa Cruises and Carnival Cruise Line, subsidiaries of Carnival Corporation & plc.

The ship's design is based on the design of Carnival's Conquest class fleet of ships. However, their design from lido (pool) deck up to the top deck was enlarged and redesigned. The most notable difference is the structure around the main pool. The main pool features a glass exterior on both sides of the ship. A retractable magrodome was also added for the main pool. Another notable difference is the enlargement of its spa facilities. Each ship has a 21,000 ft^{2} (2,000 m^{2}) wellness facility. Additional spa cabins were also included into the Concordia class.

Carnival operates only a single vessel in this class, Carnival Splendor, which is marketed as a Splendor-class ship. Including Carnival Splendor, there are currently five ships sailing in the Concordia class.

The lead ship of the class was irreparably damaged in the January 2012 Costa Concordia disaster.

== Incidents and accidents ==
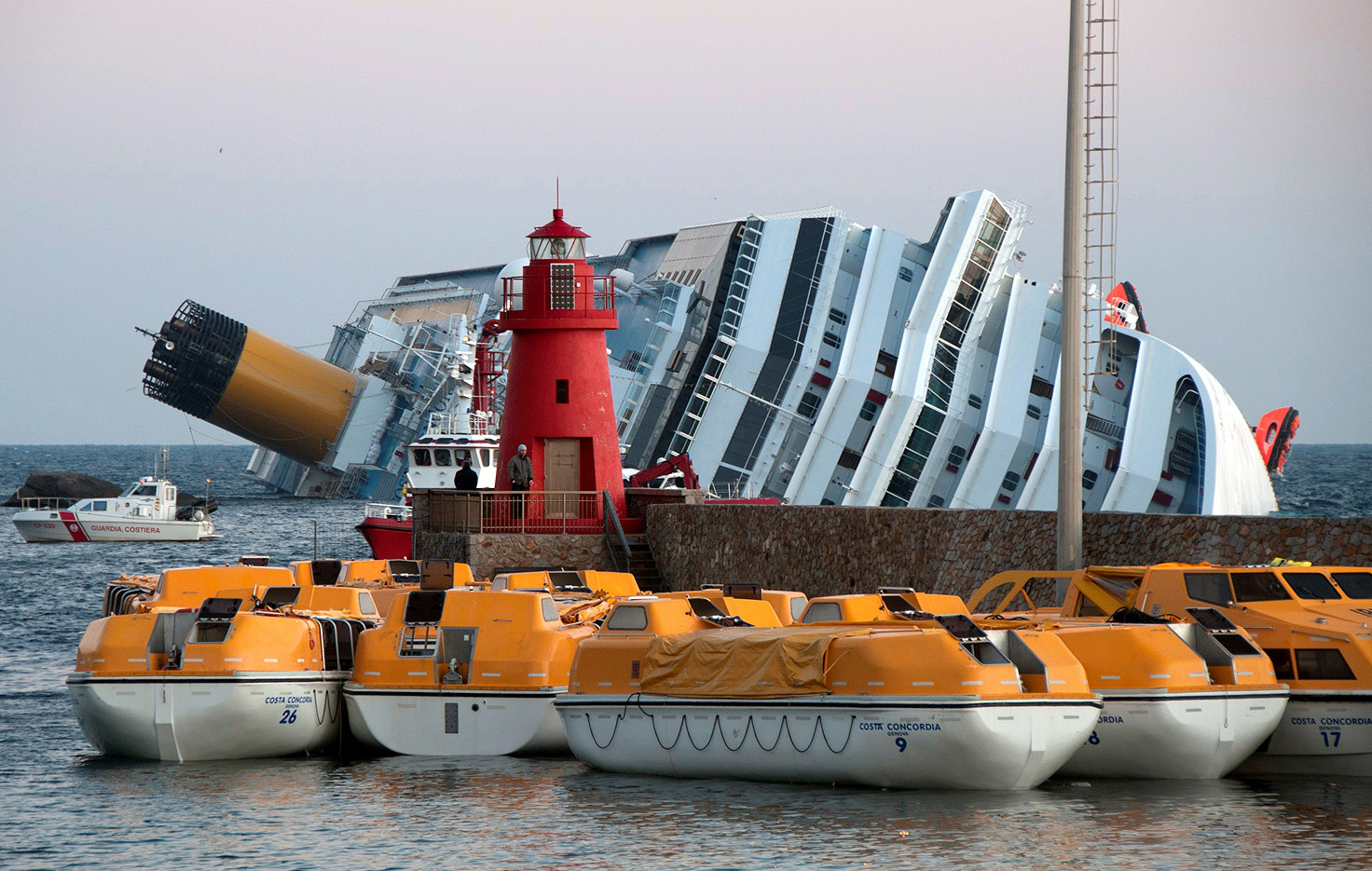
Costa Concordia capsized on January 13, 2012

Carnival Splendor experienced a fire in her engine room on November 8, 2010, resulting in a loss of all electrical power and stranding the vessel with almost 4,500 on board.

Costa Concordia sank on January 13, 2012, after running aground shortly off the coast of Tuscany, resulting in 32 fatalities (33 including the later death of a salvage worker). The ship had departed from Civitavecchia on a seven-day Mediterranean cruise with 3,229 passengers and a crew of 1,023. The grounding caused a 50-metre (160 ft) gash in the hull, flooding the ship, causing her to list and drift toward the shore, where she later capsized and sank. Although the ship had sunk only partially and next to the shore, the evacuation was chaotic and her captain was subsequently arrested on preliminary charges of multiple manslaughter in connection with not only causing a shipwreck, but also failing to assist 300 passengers and failing to be the last to leave the wreck.

== Vessels of the class ==
Built	Ship	Tonnage	Flag	Notes	Image
Costa Cruises
2007	Costa Serena	114,500 GT	Italy	First sister to Costa Concordia	
2009	Costa Pacifica	114,500 GT	Italy		
2011	Costa Favolosa	114,500 GT	Italy	Identical to Costa Fascinosa, modified Concordia class	
2012	Costa Fascinosa	114,500 GT	Italy	Identical to Costa Favolosa, modified Concordia class	
Carnival Cruise Line
2008	Carnival Splendor	113,323 GT	Panama	Referred to as a Splendor-class cruise ship. Originally designed and ordered for Costa Crociere but transferred to Carnival Cruise Lines during construction. Originally planned to be named Costa Splendor.	
Former ships
2006	Costa Concordia	114,500 GT	Italy	Capsized and sank in 2012; salvaged in 2014 and scrapped in 2017	

== See also ==
- List of cruise ship classes
