= Costa Cruises =

Italian cruise line

Costa Crociere S.p.A.
- Type: Subsidiary
- Industry: Transportation
- Founded: March 31, 1948; 78 years ago
- Headquarters: Genoa, Italy
- Area served: World
- Key people: Mario Zanetti, President
- Products: Cruises
- Revenue: $2.236 billion (2018)
- Parent: Carnival
- Website: www.costacruises.com

Costa Crociere S.p.A. (Italian pronunciation: [ˈkɔsta kroˈtʃɛːre]), operating as Costa Cruises, is an Italian cruise line founded in 1948 and organized as a wholly owned subsidiary of Carnival Corporation & plc since 2000. Based in Genoa, Italy, the cruise line primarily caters to the European cruise market, but the company's 10 ships, which all sail under the Italian flag, provide itineraries sailing to countries globally.

== History ==
=== Origins ===
Founded in Genoa in 1854 by Giacomo Costa (1836–1916) as Giacomo Costa fu Andrea, the company originally traded in olive oils and textiles, later establishing its own refinery and the brand "Dante". In 1924, the company was passed to the founder's sons (Federico, Eugenio and Enrico) and started shipping activities, buying its first cargo vessel, Ravenna. Seven more cargo ships were purchased before World War II, during which all but one were lost.

=== Costa Line ===
After the war, the company decided to rebuild its shipping business, but concentrating on passenger traffic, particularly across the Atlantic. In 1946–1947 they bought three American-owned cargo ships, refitting them with accommodation for 25 first class passengers, and in 1947 commenced a scheduled liner service between Genoa, Montevideo and Buenos Aires. At the same time, the name of the company was changed to Linea C. In March 1948, full passenger services were introduced on the South American route, operated by the ship Anna C, with her previous capacity increased from 100 to 500 passengers. The ship departed from Genoa and reached Buenos Aires 16 days after departure, the first ocean liner to cross the South Atlantic Ocean following World War II.

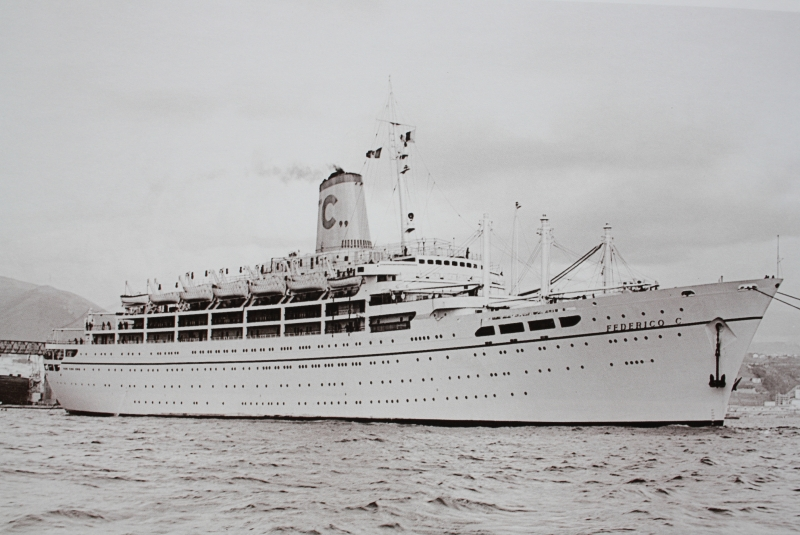
Federico C of 1958, Costa's first purpose-built passenger ship.

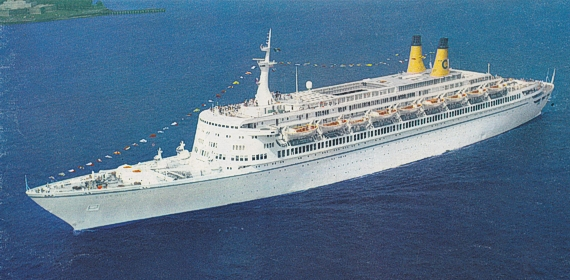
Eugenio C of 1966

In 1958, Costa commissioned their first purpose-built ship, Federico C, which provided a liner service between Genoa, Italy and Buenos Aires, Argentina via Rio de Janeiro, Brazil. In 1959, the company gradually transitioned into offering more pleasure holidays, with trips being offered in the Mediterranean and the Caribbean regions. The second purpose built ship, Eugenio C, debuted in 1966, designed by famous naval architect Nicolò Costanzi. Linea C went on to own 12 more ships by 1980, making the company the owner of the world's largest fleet of passenger ships. In 1986, Linea C changed its name to Costa Cruises and became a cruise-centered business.

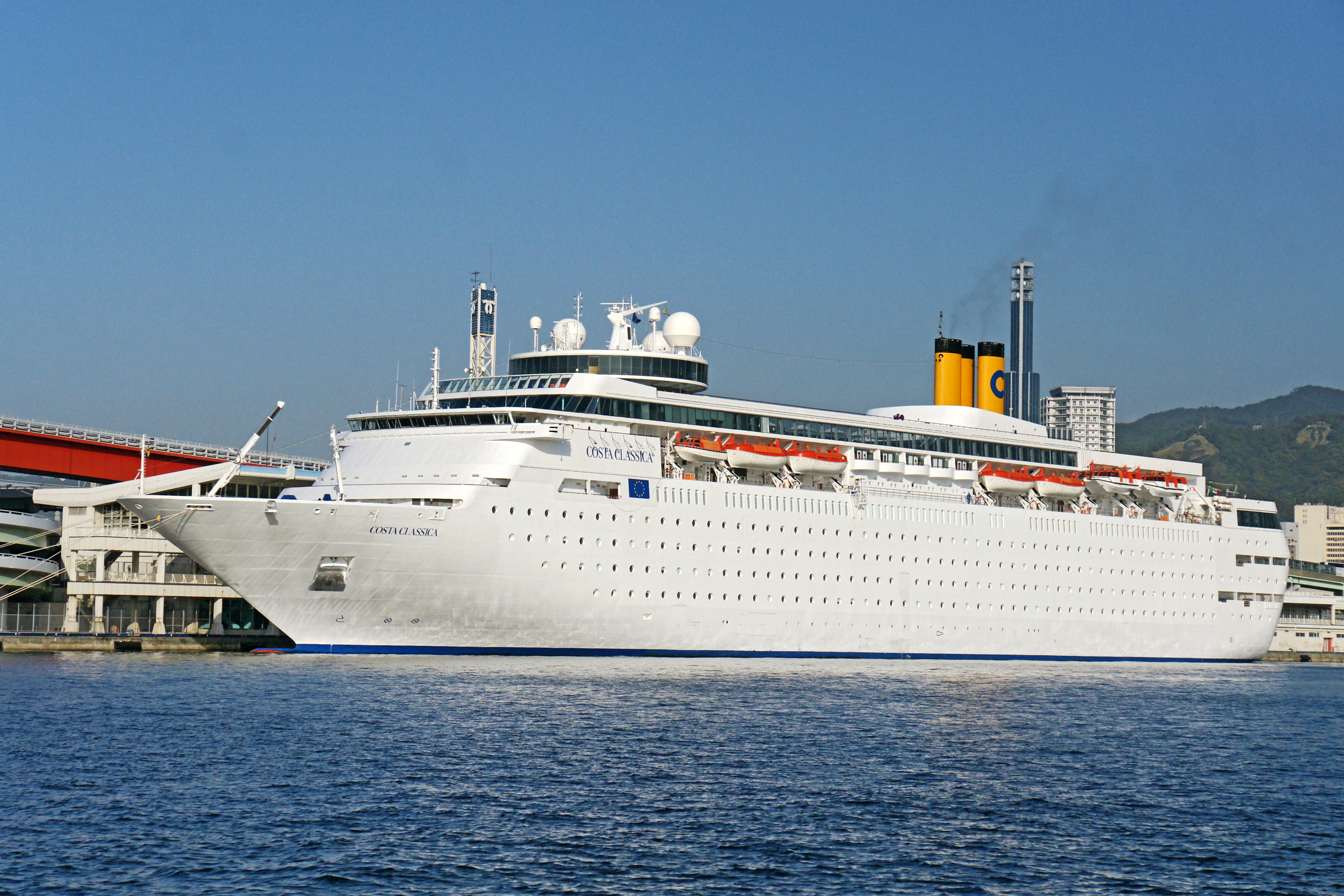
The Costa Classica, first new build for Costa in over 25 years

House flag of Costa Crociere

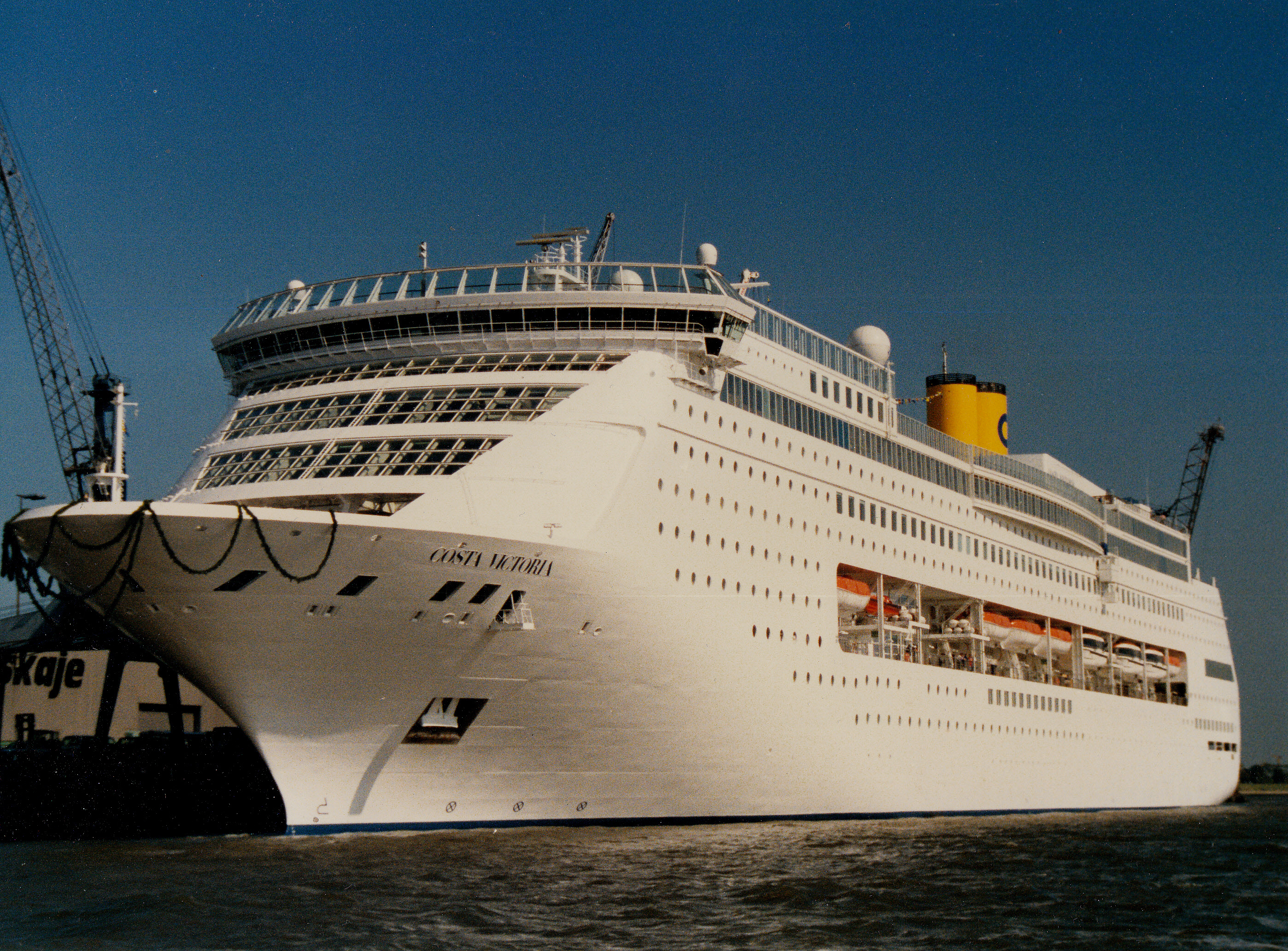
Costa Victoria, the final ship completed under the original Costa Cruises

The line had decided to modernize its fleet by the late 1980s, and ordered two new ships in 1987, which became Costa Classica and Costa Romantica entering service in 1991 and 1993 respectively. The line also converted and completely rebuilt two former container ships into Costa Marina and Costa Allegra around the same time as ordering the two new ships. Costa wanted to create a new upscale European brand for their new ships and launched the short-lived EuroLuxe brand.

The Costa Victoria debuted in 1996, and was the largest cruise ship ever built in Germany at the time, and largest for the Costa. Its completion cost was covered by selling the Eugenio Costa. The Costa Victoria would be the final ship completed under the Costa family brand before the line was taken over by Carnival Corporation & plc. The ship was scheduled to have a sister, the Costa Olympia, which was never completed for the line after the shipyards bankruptcy, and instead the uncompleted hull was sold to Norwegian Cruise Line.

In March 1997, Carnival and Airtours PLC purchased Costa Cruises for $300 million, on a 50:50 basis. At the time, Costa Cruises was the leading European cruise line, with an estimated market share of 19%.

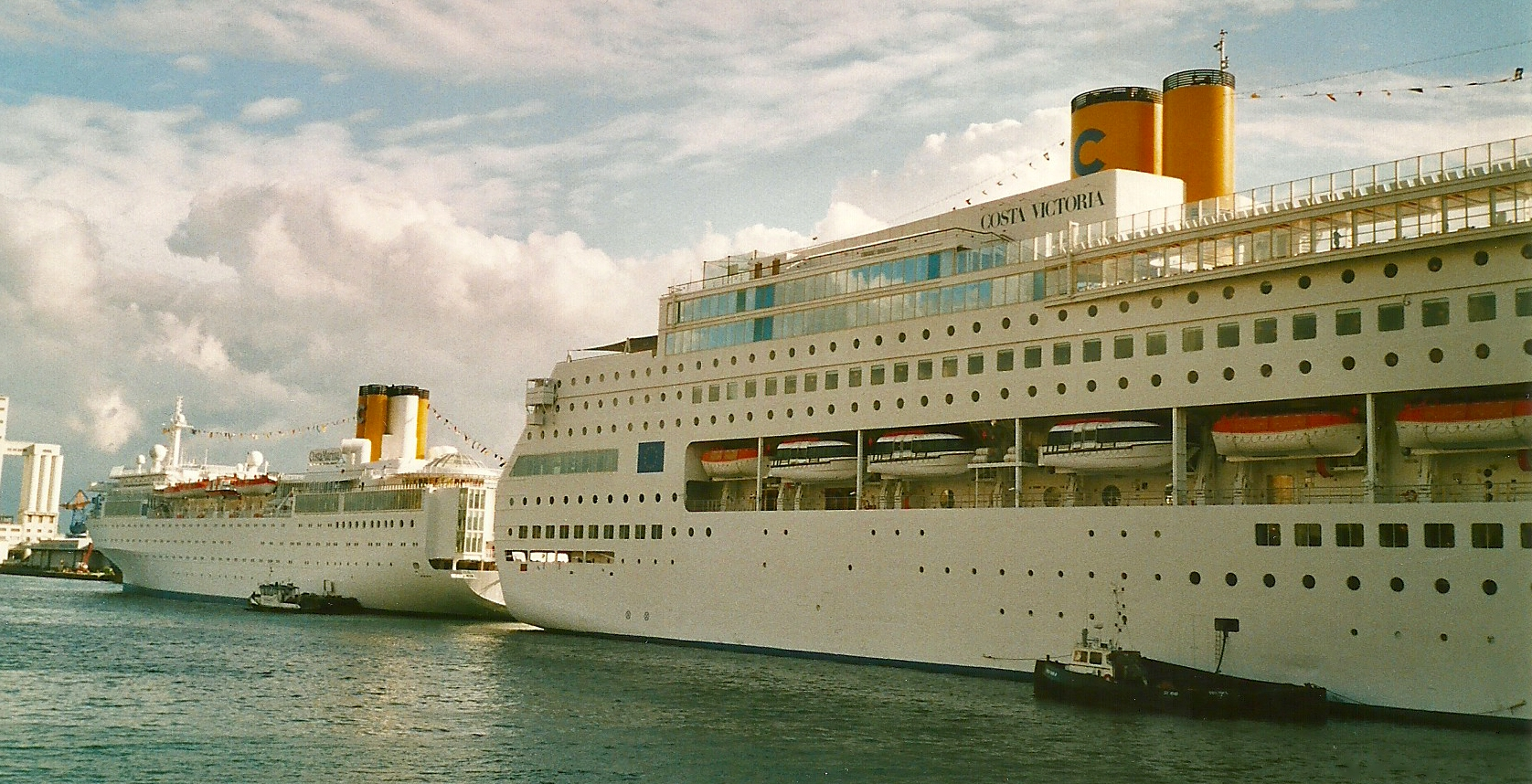
Costa Victoria and Costa Marina in port.

=== Carnival subsidiary ===
After Carnival's take over, a new-building program commenced for the line, utilizing Carnival Cruise Lines Spirit-class and Destiny-class design platforms for the new ships. The line would also utilize Carnival's designer Joe Farcus, who undertook the interior design, moving away from the contemporary Italian style of the previous ships to more themed public spaces similar to Carnival Cruise Line. The first ship delivered under Carnival Corp management, was Costa Atlantica in 2000.

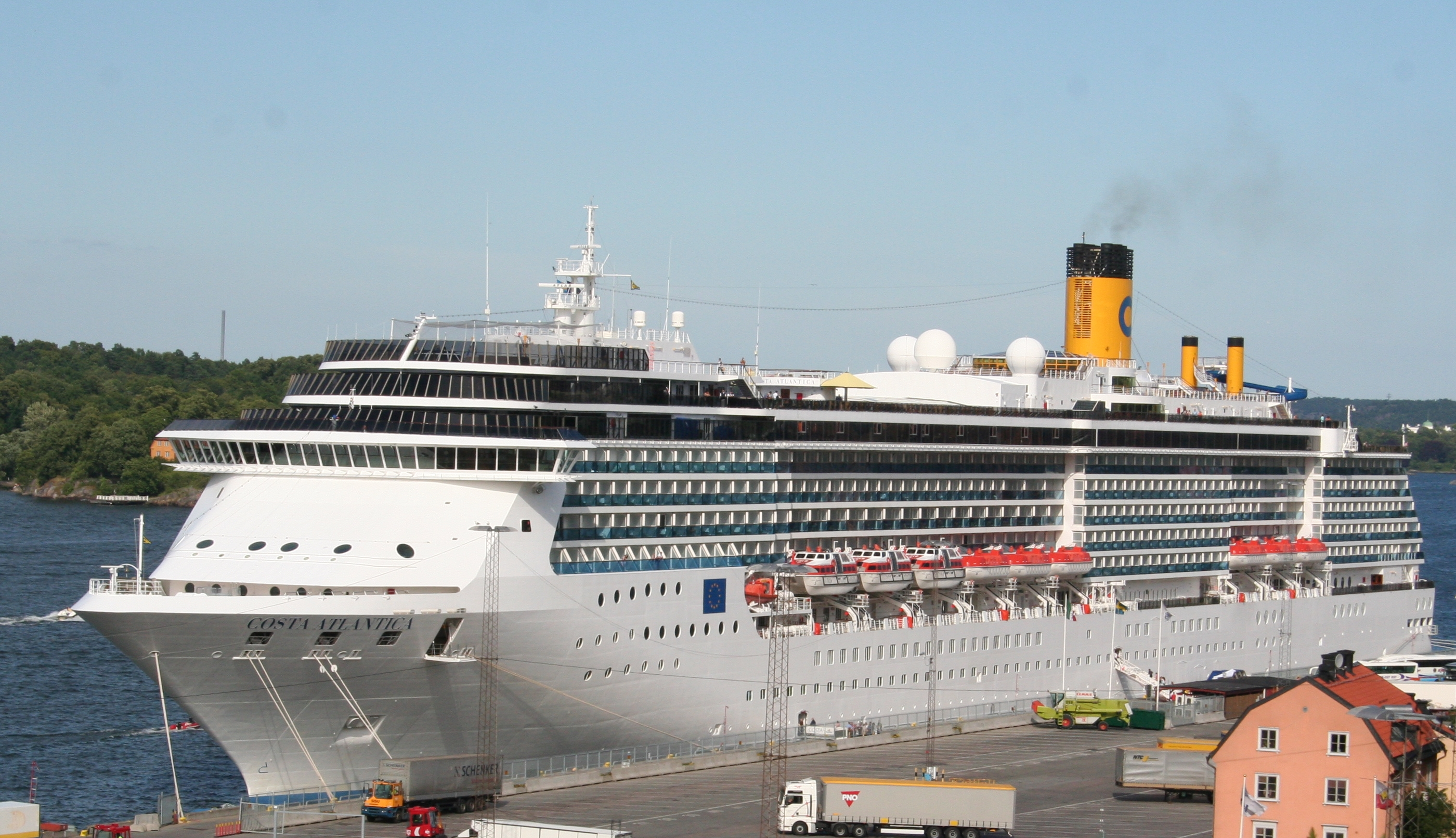
Costa Atlantica, first ship to debut under new Carnival Corp. ownership using Spirit-class design platform

In 2000, Carnival Corporation took full control of Costa Crociere after buying out Airtours' 50% interest for $525 million. Carnival Corporation would transfer older ships from their other brands to Costa, with the Costa Tropicale (former Carnival Cruise Line Tropicale) in 2001, and the Costa Europa (former Holland American Line Westerdam) in 2002.

In 2002, Carnival Corporation and P&O Princess Cruises merged to form Carnival Corporation & plc, bringing together both companies' assets under one corporation. As of 2018, Costa accounted for approximately 12% of Carnival Corporation & plc's revenue.

In 2004, Costa Crociere purchased control of AIDA Cruises of Germany. Carnival Corporation and the Spanish tour operator Orizonia Group created a joint venture in 2007, Ibero Cruises, which was absorbed into Costa Cruises in 2014.

The company attracted international attention when Costa Concordia ran aground and capsized off the coast of Italy on 13 January 2012. Thirty-two people died in the disaster. Six weeks later, the company made headlines again when a fire on Costa Allegra left it drifting without power for 13 hours in waters near Somalia frequented by pirates, before the ship was taken under tow.

In February 2018, Costa announced its partnership with the Italian football club, Juventus.

In December 2019, Costa debuted Costa Smeralda and became the second cruise line to operate a cruise ship fully powered by liquefied natural gas (LNG), following AIDA's AIDAnova one year earlier. Costa Smeralda was joined by her sister LNG ship, Costa Toscana, in 2021.

Owing to the Covid pandemic of 2020, Costa sold some of its ships, including the Costa Victoria and Costa neoRomantica to help cut costs. It also led to the continued long term layup of the Costa Magica and Costa Serena.

In 2022, parent company Carnival Corp. announced they would be transferring ships out of the fleet to help balance overall fleet capacities due to the pandemic and the selling of numerous ships. It was announced the Costa Luminosa would be transferred to Carnival Cruise Line, the Costa Venezia and the Costa Firenze will join Carnival Fleet under the new "Carnival Fun Italian Style" concept in 2023 and 2024 respectively.

In February 2023, it was announced that Costa Magica had been sold to Seajets, a Greek/Cypriot ferry company.

On 31 March 2023, Costa Cruises celebrated its 75th anniversary.

In May 2025, it was announced that Costa Fortuna had been sold to Margaritaville at Sea, leaving the fleet in September 2026.

== Fleet ==
=== Current fleet ===
Ship	Built	Builder	Entered service for Costa	Gross tonnage	Flag	Notes	Image
Concordia class
Costa Serena	2007	Fincantieri	2007	114,500	(Italy)	Concordia class	
Costa Pacifica	2009	Fincantieri	2009	114,500	(Italy)	Concordia class	
Costa Favolosa	2011	Fincantieri	2011	114,500	(Italy)	Modified Concordia class	
Costa Fascinosa	2012	Fincantieri	2012	114,500	(Italy)	Modified Concordia class	
Luminosa class (Hybrid Spirit/Vista class)
Costa Deliziosa	2010	Fincantieri	2010	92,720	(Italy)	Hybrid design between Atlantica- and Vista-class ships	
Diadema (Dream) class
Costa Diadema	2014	Fincantieri	2014	133,019	(Italy)	Modified Dream-class ship	
Excellence class
Costa Smeralda	2019	Meyer Turku	2019	185,010	(Italy)	Largest ship built for Costa Cruises. Powered by LNG.	
Costa Toscana	2021	Meyer Turku	2021	185,010	(Italy)	Powered by LNG.	

=== Former fleet ===
Costa's former fleet in chronological order:

Ship	In Costa service	Notes	Image
Maria C	1946–1953	Passenger-cargo; Built in 1913 in Bremen as Pommern, and later USS Rappahannock and William Luckenbach. Scrapped in 1953.	
Giovanna C	1947–1953	Passenger-cargo; Built in 1919 in Asano, Japan as Eastern Trader, later Horace Luckenbach. Scrapped in 1953.	
Luisa C	1947–1955	Passenger-cargo; Built in 1919 in Asano, Japan as Eastern Merchant, later Robert Luckenbach. Sold in 1955 and renamed Sula, then scrapped in 1959.	
Anna C	1948–1971	Formerly Prince Line's Southern Prince. Requisitioned as HMS Southern Prince in World War II. Scrapped after a serious fire in 1971.	
Andrea C	1948–1981	Built in 1942 as the Ocean ship, Ocean Virtue. Converted for passenger use in 1948. Scrapped in 1982.	
Franca C	1952–1977	Was one of the world's oldest active cruise ships (built in 1914) when finally retired from service in 2009. Laid up until 2015, then converted to a land locked hotel in Bintan, Indonesia from 2016 to 2019 and renamed Doulos Phos, The Ship Hotel	
Federico C	1958–1983	First purpose built passenger ship for Costa Line. Abandoned and sank in 2000 after engine room flooded.	
Bianca C.	1959–1961	Sank on 24 October 1961 following an explosion and fire in the engine room.	
Enrico C Enrico Costa	1965–1994	Sold to MSC Cruises in 1994 and renamed Symphony. Scrapped in 2001.	
Eugenio C	1966–1996	Sold in 1996 by Costa Cruises to Bremer Vulcan shipyard in part exchange for the construction of the Costa Victoria. Resold and saw further service as Edinburgh Castle for Direct Cruises and as The Big Red Boat II for Premier Cruises. Laid up from 2000 until 2005. Scrapped in Alang in 2005.	
Carla C Carla Costa	1967–1992	Scrapped in Aliaga in 1994 after a fire destroyed the ship.	
Flavia	1968–1982	Formerly the Cunard Line's RMS Media. Scrapped in 1989 in Kaohsiung after a fire.	
Fulvia C	1969–1970	Sank on 20 July 1970 following an explosion and fire in the engine room off Tenerife, Canary Islands.	
Italia	1974–1983	Scrapped in 2010 at Alang as Sapphire.	
Angelina Lauro	1977–1979	Chartered from Lauro Lines. The ship was destroyed by fire while docked in Saint Thomas, U.S. Virgin Islands on 30 March 1979. The ship later sank on 24 September 1979 while being towed to a scrapyard.	
World Renaissance	1977–1982	Chartered from Epirotiki from 1977 until the early 1980s. Scrapped in Alang in 2010.	
Danae C	1979–1992	Scrapped in Aliağa in 2015.	
Daphne C	1979–1997	Scrapped in Alang in 2014.	
Amerikanis	1980–1984	Chartered from the Chandris Line between 1980 and 1984. Scrapped in Alang in 2001.	
Columbus C	1981–1984	Formerly an ocean liner before being converted into cruise ship. Struck a breakwater in 1984 and partially sank, then scrapped.	
Costa Riviera	1981–1993; 1994–2002	Scrapped in Alang in 2002.	
Costa Marina	1988–2011	Converted container ship. Scrapped at Alang in 2014.	
Costa Allegra	1989–2012	Converted container ship. Withdrawn from service following an engine room fire on 27 February 2012 and scrapped in Aliaga.	
Costa Classica; Costa neoClassica	1991–2018	Originally Costa Classica, she received a €18 million refit in 2014 and renamed Costa neoClassica. Left the fleet in March 2018 after being sold to Bahamas Paradise Cruise Line and now operating as Margaritaville at Sea Paradise.	
Costa Romantica; Costa neoRomantica	1993–2020	Originally Costa Romantica, received a €90 million refit in 2012 adding two half decks and was renamed Costa neoRomantica. The ship was sold to Celestyal Cruises renamed Celestyal Experience and left the fleet in 2020. Celestyal Cruises resold her in 2021 after which she was sold to the Gadani Ship Breaking Yard in Pakistan for scrapping. It was beached for scrapping on 3 December 2021.	
Costa Playa	1995–1998	Scrapped in China in 2009.	
Costa Victoria	1996–2020	Sold to Genova Trasporti Marittimi in June 2020 in Piombino; thereafter resold and beached on 28 January 2021 in Aliağa for scrap.	
Costa Olympia	(1998) Never entered service	Originally ordered for Costa Cruises and was to be the sister ship of Costa Victoria. Its construction was halted following the financial collapse of Bremer Vulkan shipyard. The unfinished hull was sold to Norwegian Cruise Lines and was completed as Norwegian Sky.	
Costa Atlantica	2000–2020	Sold to Adora Cruises in November 2018 and transferred in January 2020.	
Costa Tropicale	2001–2005	Previously Tropicale for Carnival Cruise Line. Scrapped in Alang in 2021	
Costa Europa	2002–2010	Sold to Thomson Cruises in 2010. Retired from service in 2020. Scrapped in 2022	
Costa Mediterranea	2003–2020	Sold to Adora Cruises in November 2018 and laid up beginning in 2020.	
Costa Fortuna	2003-2026	Identical to Carnival Triumph and Carnival Victory. Sold to Margaritaville at Sea in 2026 and renamed Margaritaville at Sea Beachcomber.	
Costa Magica	2004–2023	Identical to Carnival Triumph and Carnival Victory; Sold to Seajets in February 2023 and renamed Mykonos Magic.	
Costa Concordia	2006–2012	Ran aground, capsized, and partially sunk on 13 January 2012. It was later deemed a constructive total loss and the wreck was later removed and scrapped in Genoa by 2017.	
Costa Splendor	(2008) Never entered service	Originally ordered for Costa Cruises but transferred during construction to Carnival Cruise Line and became Carnival Splendor in 2008.	
Costa Luminosa	2009–2022	Transferred to Carnival Cruise Line in September 2022 and renamed Carnival Luminosa sailing seasonally between Australia/South Pacific & Alaska.	
Costa Voyager	2011–2014	Previously sailed as Grand Voyager for Iberocruceros. Sold in 2014 to Bohai Ferry Company and now Chinese Taishan.	
Costa neoRiviera	2013–2019	Previously Mistral for Festival Cruises and Grand Mistral For Ibero Cruises. Transferred to AIDA Cruises and operating as AIDAmira from December 2019.	
Costa Celebration	(2014) Never entered service	Previously Celebration for Carnival Cruise Line and Grand Celebration for Iberocruceros. Inherited from Iberocruceros after its operations were discontinued and merged into Costa's. She underwent a refit and was renamed. However, on the day before the ship was scheduled to depart on her inaugural voyage with Costa, she was sold to Bahamas Paradise Cruise Line. She was scrapped in Alang in 2021.	
Costa Venezia	2019–2022	Modified Vista-class ship Originally planned to serve the Chinese market but later amended to the Mediterranean; Now it is sailing out of New York City for Carnival under the Carnival Fun Italian Style concept from June 2023, as Carnival Venezia.	
Costa Firenze	2020–2024	Modified Vista-class ship Originally planned to serve the Chinese market but later amended to the Mediterranean. Sails out of Long Beach for Carnival under the Carnival Fun Italian Style concept since 2024. Renamed Carnival Firenze.	

== Accidents and incidents ==
See also Carnival Cruise Line's accidents and incidents for incidents associated with the parent company's other cruise operations.

=== MV Bianca C. fire and sinking ===
On 22 October 1961, Bianca C. was off Grenada when an explosion occurred in the engine room. Two crew members died in the explosion and the ship subsequently caught on fire. Local fishermen helped rescue the passengers and crew, but as the local authorities did not have the equipment to extinguish the fire, the ship was left to burn until the British frigate HMS Londonderry arrived from Puerto Rico. The burning ship was in the main anchorage and would block the harbour if it sank there, so the Londonderry towed it to a different location where the Bianca C. sank on 24 October 1961.

=== Costa Europa collision with pier ===
On 25 February 2010, Costa Europa collided with a pier in Sharm El Sheikh in Egypt, killing 3 crew members and injuring 4. Costa blamed strong winds for the collision.

=== Costa Classica collision ===
On 18 October 2010, Costa Classica collided with the Belgian bulk carrier, Lowlands Longevity in the mouth of the Yangtze river. The collision caused a gash over 60 feet long in the side of the ship.

=== Costa Concordia capsizing ===
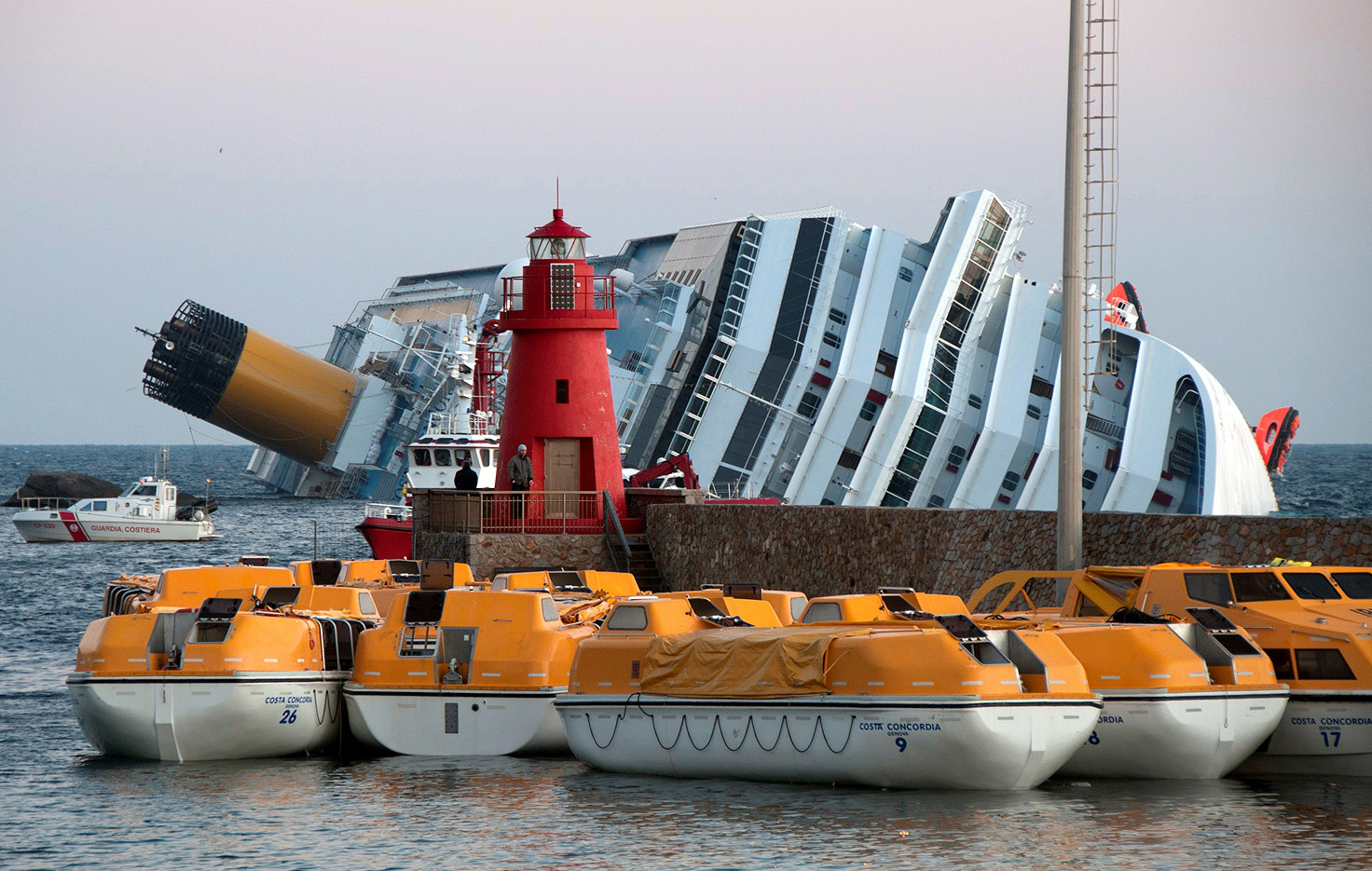
Costa Concordia capsized on reef

On 13 January 2012, Costa Concordia ran aground off Isola del Giglio in Tuscany. The ship capsized and partially sank, killing 32 people. In 2014, the ship was parbuckled and refloated with caissons, and in July 2014, she was towed to the Port of Genoa over a period of five days, where it was dismantled and eventually scrapped. The total cost of the disaster was estimated to be over $2 billion.

On 11 February 2015, the captain at the helm during the sinking, Francesco Schettino, was found guilty by an Italian court on multiple counts of manslaughter, causing the shipwreck, and abandoning his passengers. He was sentenced to 16 years in prison. An Italian appeals court on 31 May 2016 upheld the 16-year prison sentence.

=== Costa Allegra engine room fire ===
On 27 February 2012, Costa Allegra suffered an engine room fire and went adrift in the Indian Ocean. After several days adrift without power, the ship was towed to the Seychelles island of Desroches, but was unable to dock there. She was then towed to Mahé, Seychelles, where the passengers disembarked. No casualties were reported.

On 9 March 2012, it was announced that Costa Allegra would not return to service with Costa, and she was given to the shipping company, Themis Maritime Ltd. In late 2012, Costa Allegra was beached at Aliaga, Turkey, for scrapping.

=== Temporary shutdown due to the COVID-19 pandemic ===
Costa cruises around the world were cancelled in March 2020 due to the worldwide COVID-19 pandemic.

Costa began new sailings on 6 September in Italy, initially with two ships, Costa Deliziosa and Costa Diadema. At that time, the line required all passengers to be from Italy. By 27 September 2020, however, it was reported that, having implemented strict health protocols to protect its staff and guests, "Costa Cruises will be available for all European citizens who are residents in any of the countries listed in the most recent decree from the Prime Minister of Italy".

A report on 9 January 2021 stated that some cruise lines were hoping to resume some sailings in Europe in the near future but added that "it remains to be seen whether this will go ahead with much of the continent still in lockdown". Costa's Web site at that time was indicating no sailings in January but was hoping to start on 28 February with Costa Firenze, on 2 April with Costa Deliziosa, on 3 April with Costa Magica, and so on. Only Italian ports would be used initially, and the gradual restart would accept only guests from Italy.

== Gallery ==
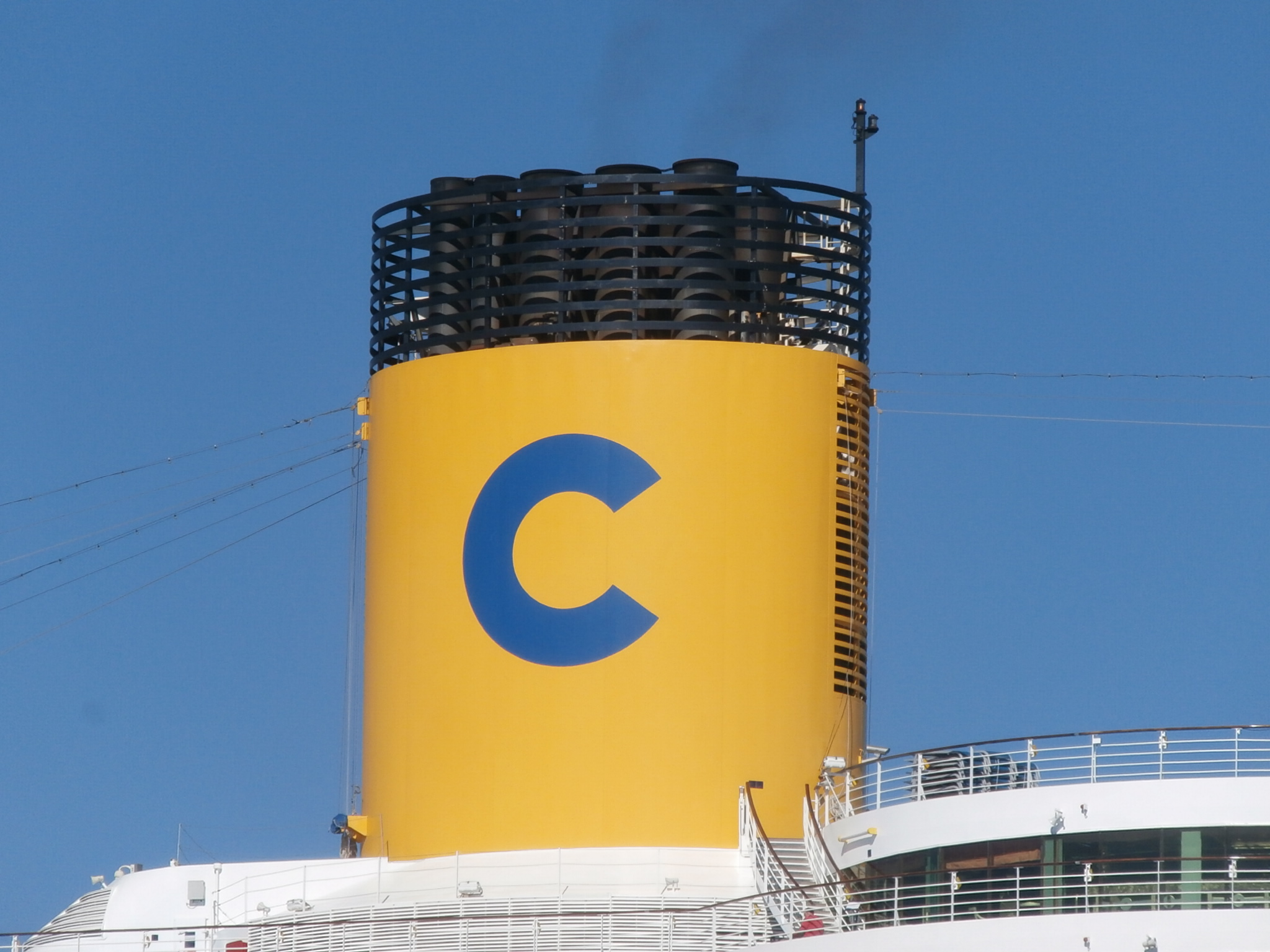
Funnel of Costa Mediterranea

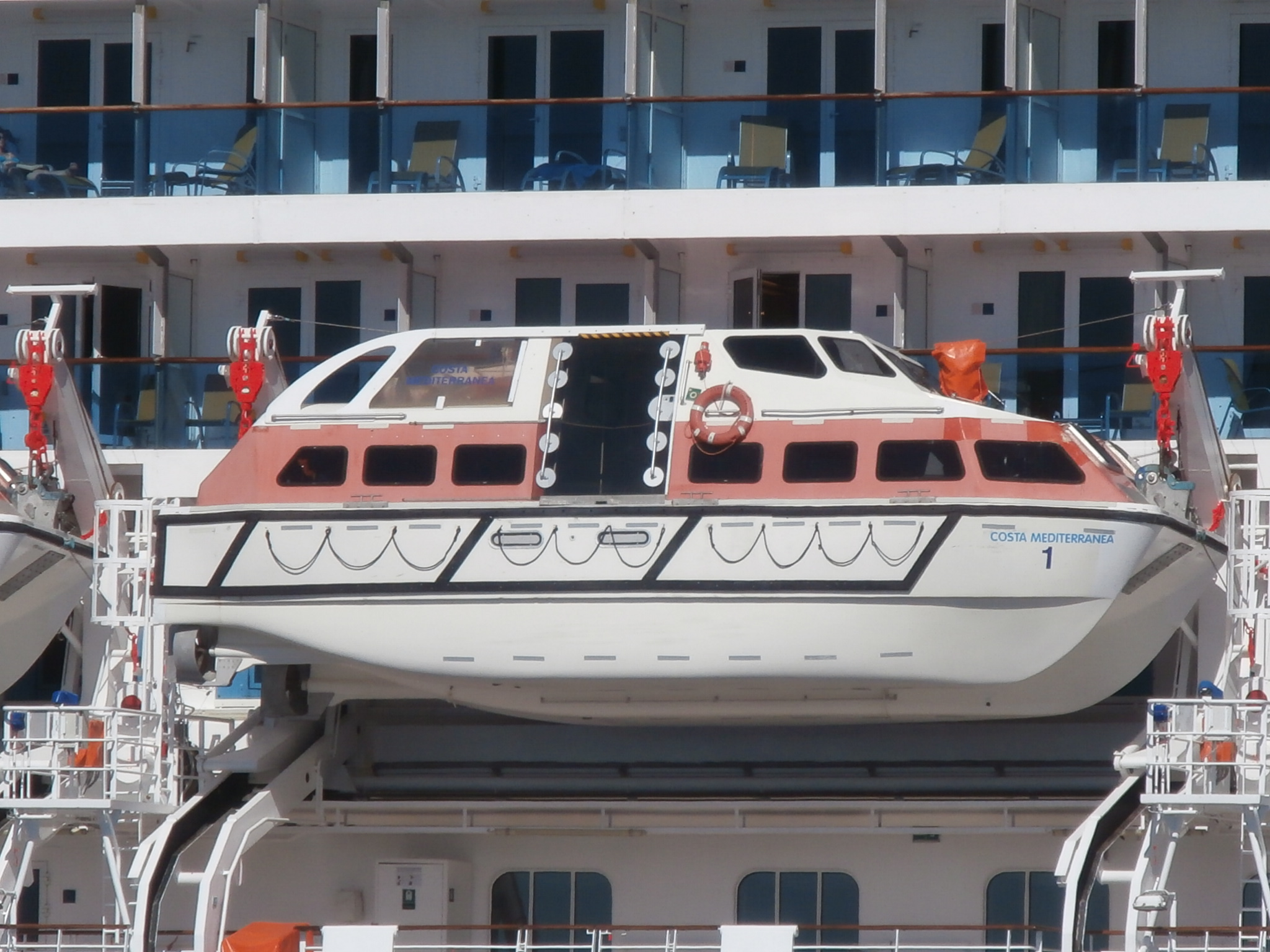
Lifeboat dually used as a tender boat on Costa Mediterranea

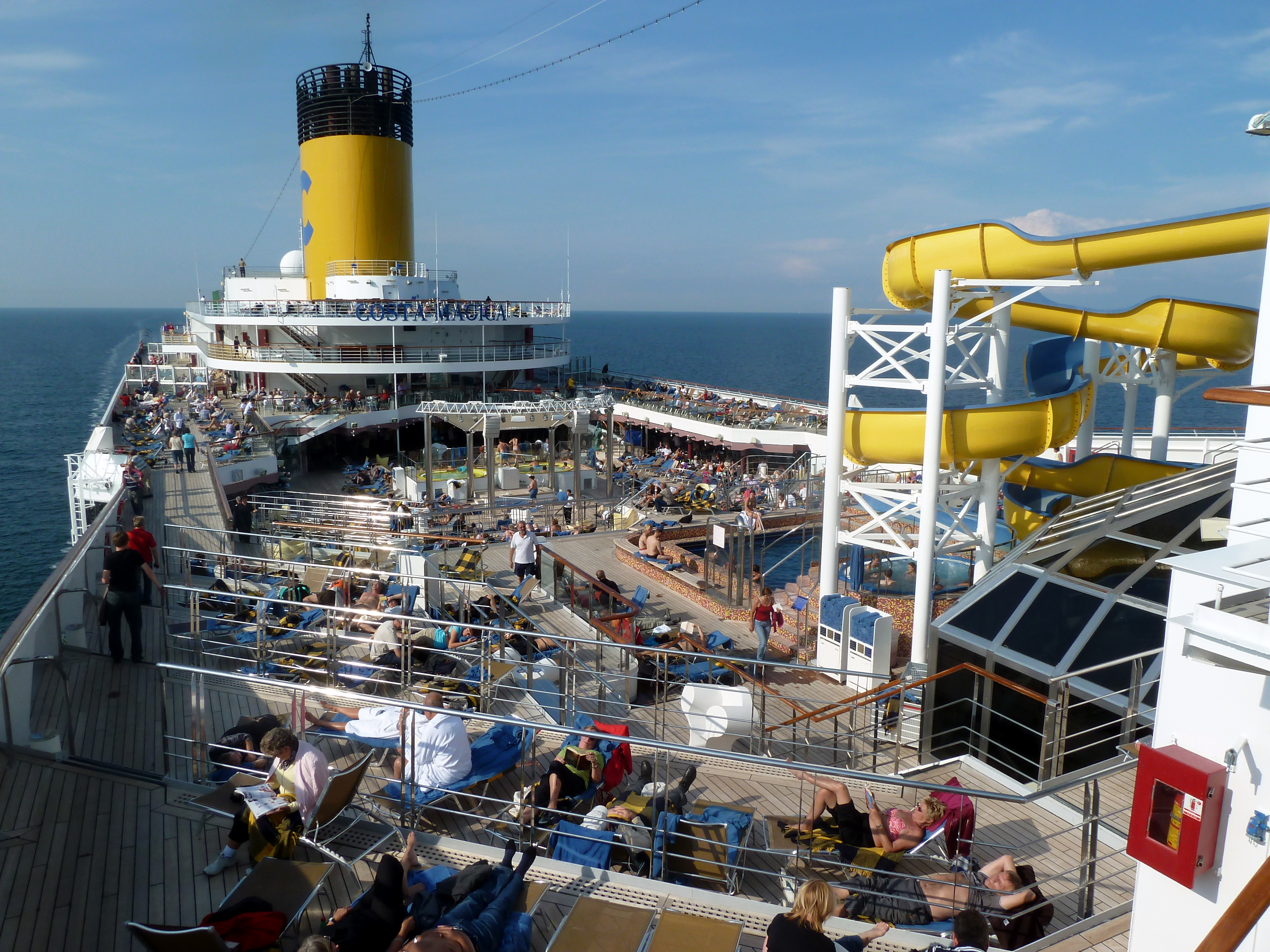
Pool deck space and water slide on Costa Magica

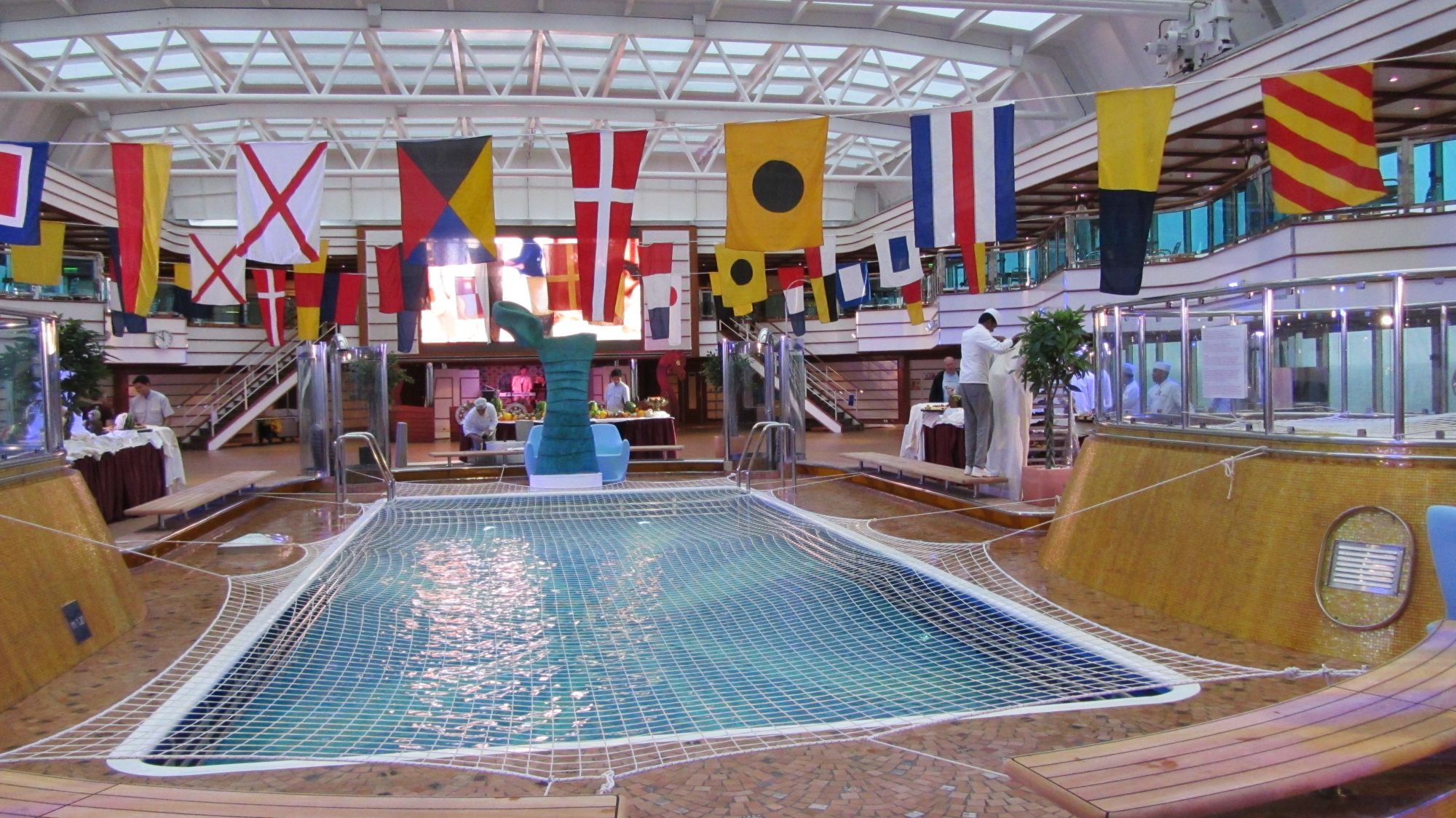
Central pool on Costa Luminosa

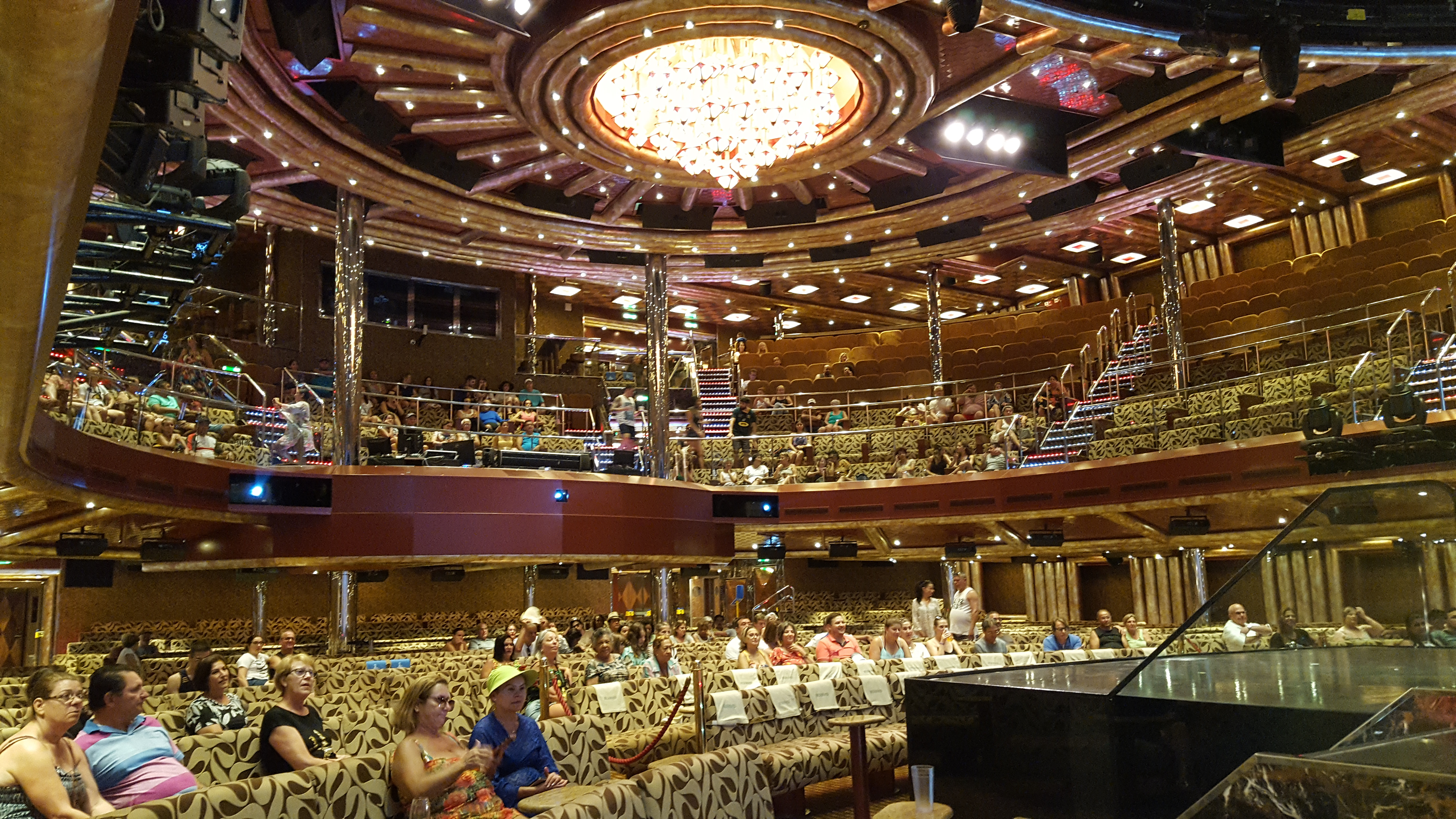
Theatre in Costa Favolosa

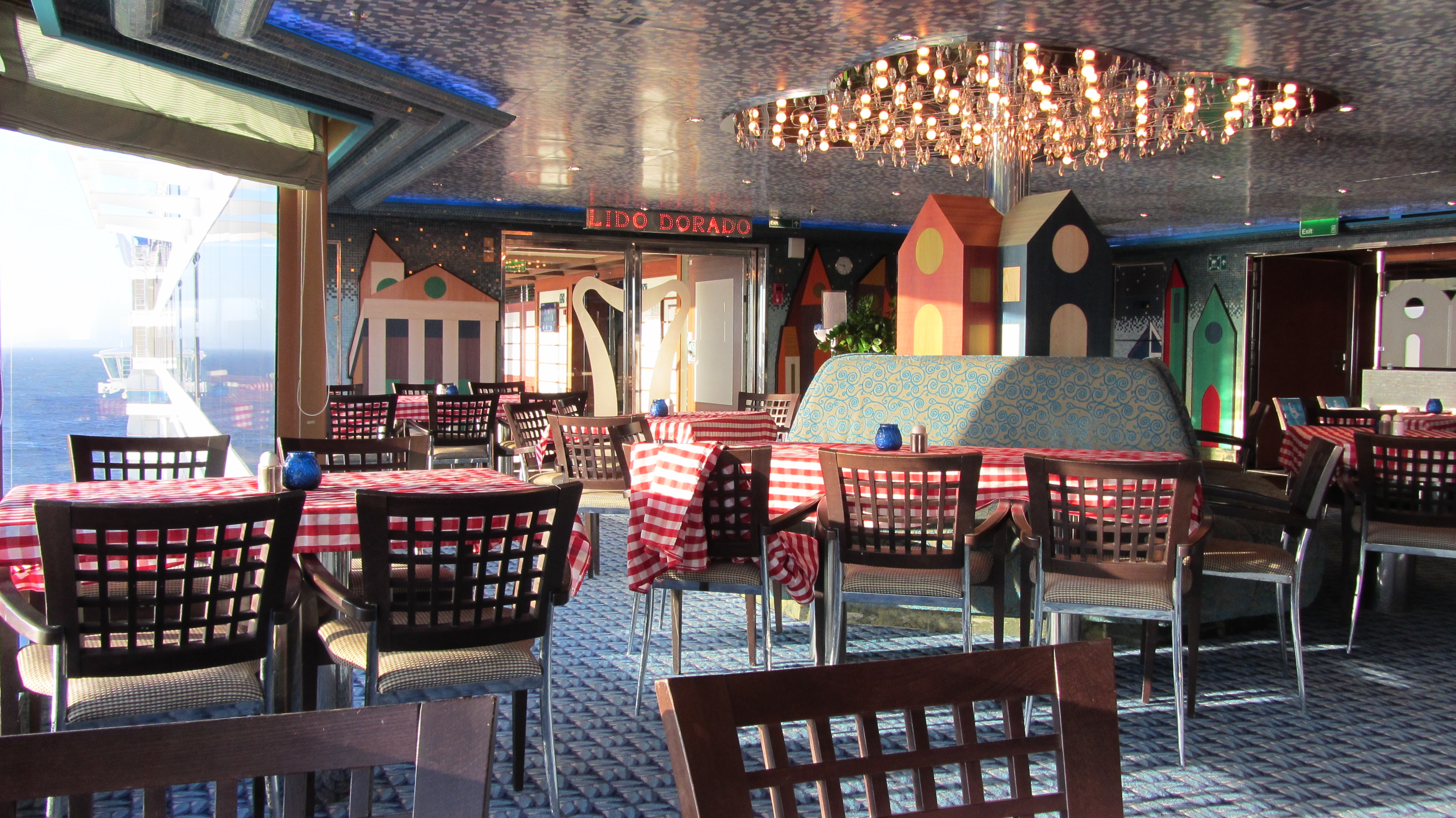
Buffet on Costa Luminosa
