= USS Rappahannock (AF-6) =

Cargo ship of the United States Navy

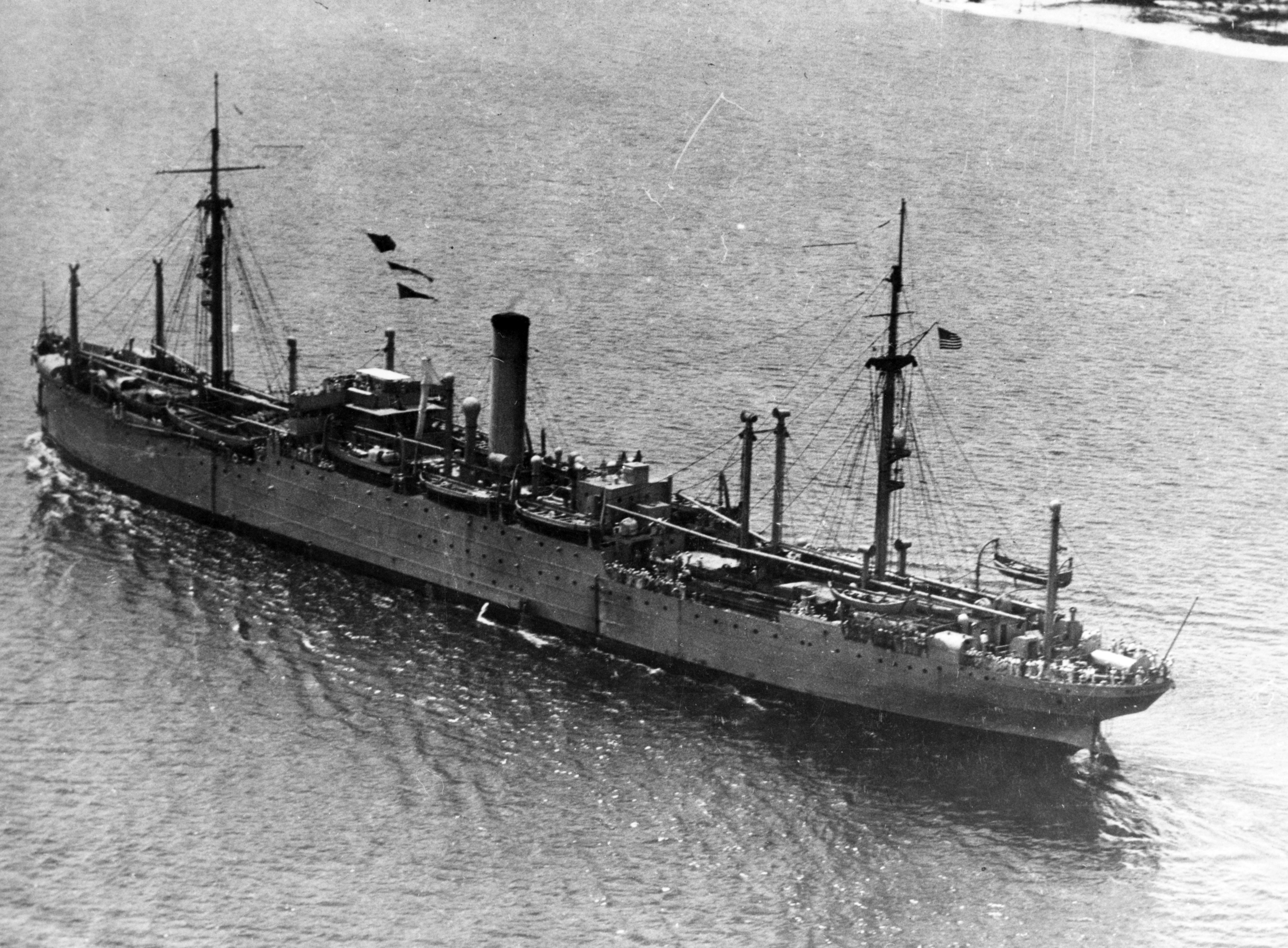

History

United States
- Laid down: 1913, as SS Pommern
- Launched: 1913
- Commissioned: as USS Rappahannock (ID-1854), 8 December 1917
- Decommissioned: 1919
- In service: as USS Rappahannock (AF-6), June 1922
- Out of service: 10 December 1924
- Stricken: 19 July 1933
- Fate: Sold to Luckenbach Steamship Co.

General characteristics
- Displacement: 17,000 long tons (17,300 t)
- Length: 471 ft 2 in (143.61 m)
- Beam: 59 ft 2 in (18.03 m)
- Draft: 26 ft 6 in (8.08 m)
- Speed: 11.5 knots (21.3 km/h)
- Complement: 155
- Armament: 1 × 5-inch gun; 1 × 3-inch gun

USS Rappahannock (AF-6) was a Rappahannock-class stores ship acquired by the U.S. Navy for use in World War I. She served in the North Atlantic Ocean, delivering animals, such as horses and steers on-the-hoof, to American Expeditionary Force troops in Europe.

== German service and seizure ==
The first Rappahannock (Id. No. 1854) was launched in 1913 as SS Pommern by the Bremer-Vulcan yards, Vegesack, Germany, for the North German Lloyd Line. She was the third freighter of the Rheinland class built for the company's Australia freight service line via the Cape of Good Hope. Pommern was voluntarily interned in Honolulu after the outbreak of World War I in Europe and was seized when the United States entered the war. She was then assigned to the US Navy by the U.S. Shipping Board; converted; delivered to the Navy 7 December 1917; renamed Rappahannock; and commissioned 8 December 1917.

== U.S. service ==
Assigned to the Naval Overseas Transportation Service as an animal transport, Rappahannock completed her fourth transatlantic run to France on 16 November 1918, five days after the Armistice. Remaining in NOTS until transferred to Train, Atlantic Fleet, on 4 February 1919, she completed one more round-trip from New York to Europe before being assigned temporary reserve status at Portsmouth in the summer of 1919. She was returned to active status in June 1922 with the designation AF-6 and, for the next 2½ years, carried cargo for both the Atlantic and Pacific Fleets.

== Merchant service ==
Rappahannock was decommissioned on 10 December 1924 and remained in reserve at Mare Island until struck from the Navy list on 19 July 1933. She was sold to the Luckenbach Steamship Co., New York City on 5 October 1933 and renamed William Luckenbach. She operated under that name through World War II. In November 1946, she was sold to the Italian company Giacomo Costa fu Andrea, becoming that company's first passenger carrier, Maria C., after being refitted with accommodation for 25 first class passengers. Together with the similar Giovanna C. and Luisa C., she established Costa Lines' liner service between Genoa, Montevideo and Buenos Aires in 1947. When ships with larger passenger capacity were placed on the South American route in 1948, the initial three ships were reassigned to a Genoa-Philadelphia-Baltimore-New York service. Withdrawn at the end of 1952, Maria C. was scrapped the following year at Savona.
