= Costa Fascinosa =

Cruise ship

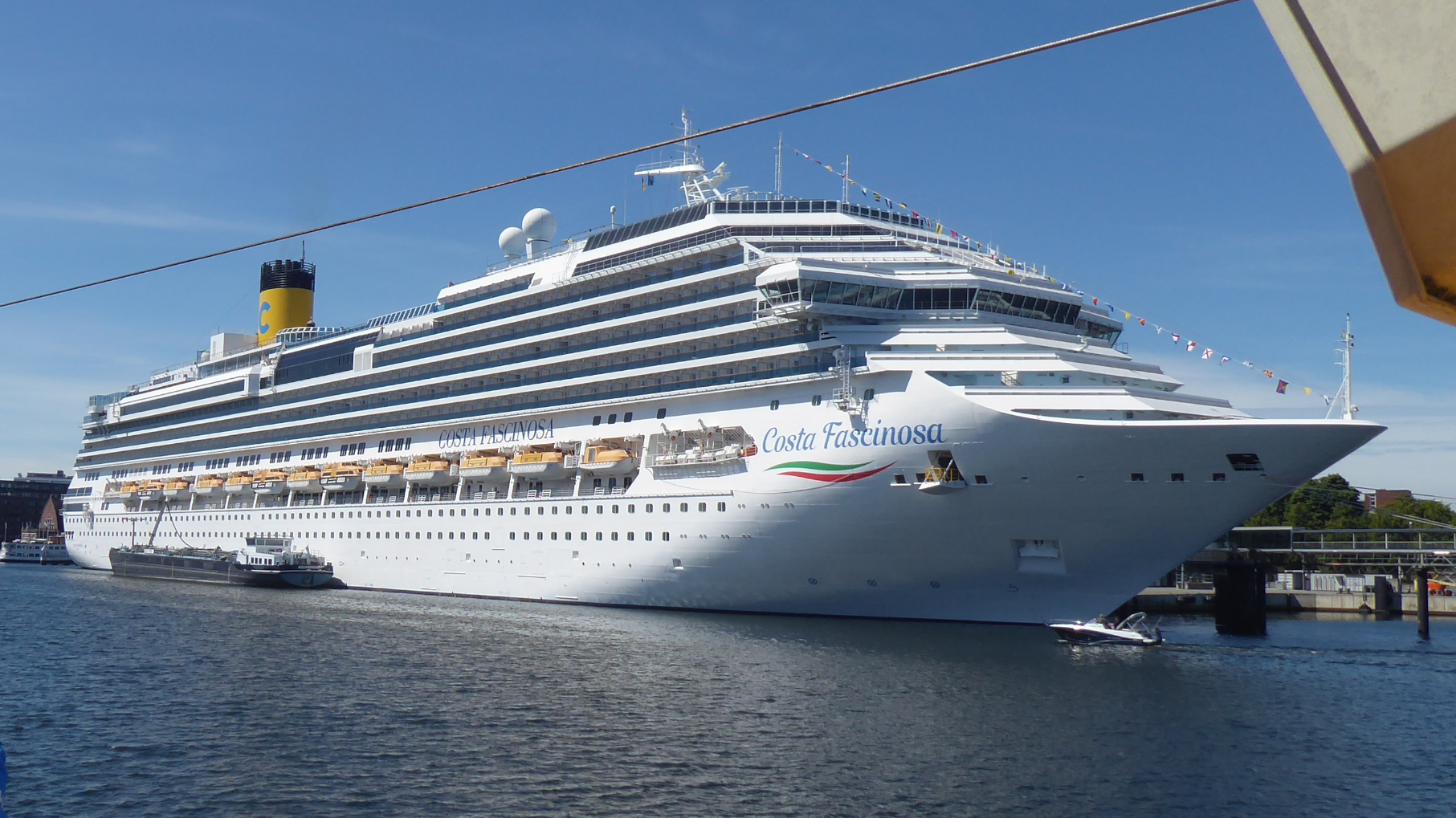
- Costa Fascinosa in 2022

History

Italy
- Name: Costa Fascinosa
- Owner: Carnival Corporation & plc
- Operator: Costa Crociere
- Ordered: October 2007
- Builder: Fincantieri, at Marghera, Venice
- Cost: 510 million euro
- Laid down: 3 September 2010
- Launched: 29 July 2011
- Christened: Elsa Gnudi
- Acquired: 27 April 2012
- Maiden voyage: 6 May 2012
- In service: 2012
- Home port: Genoa
- Identification: IMO number: 9479864; MMSI number: 247313500; Callsign: ICPO
- Status: Operational

General characteristics
- Class & type: Modified Concordia-class cruise ship
- Tonnage: 113,321 GT
- Length: 289 m (948 ft 2 in)
- Beam: 35.5 m (116 ft 6 in)
- Draught: 8.2 m (26 ft 11 in)
- Depth: 14.18 m (46 ft 6 in)
- Decks: 13
- Installed power: Wartsila, 56,323 hp (42,000 kW)
- Propulsion: 2 fixed propellers, 34,000 kW (46,000 hp) each at 146 rpm
- Speed: 23.2 knots (43.0 km/h; 26.7 mph) max
- Capacity: 3,780 passengers
- Crew: 1,100

Costa Fascinosa is a Concordia-class cruise ship that was ordered in October 2007 for Costa Crociere. Based on the Concordia-class design, Costa Fascinosa was constructed by Fincantieri's Marghera shipyard in Venice. Part of a five-ship expansion of the Costa Crociere fleet, the vessel entered service on 6 May 2012. She was Costa Crociere's flagship until Costa Diadema entered service in November 2014. She is the last ship to be built of the Concordia class, four months after the Costa Concordia disaster.

== Design and construction ==
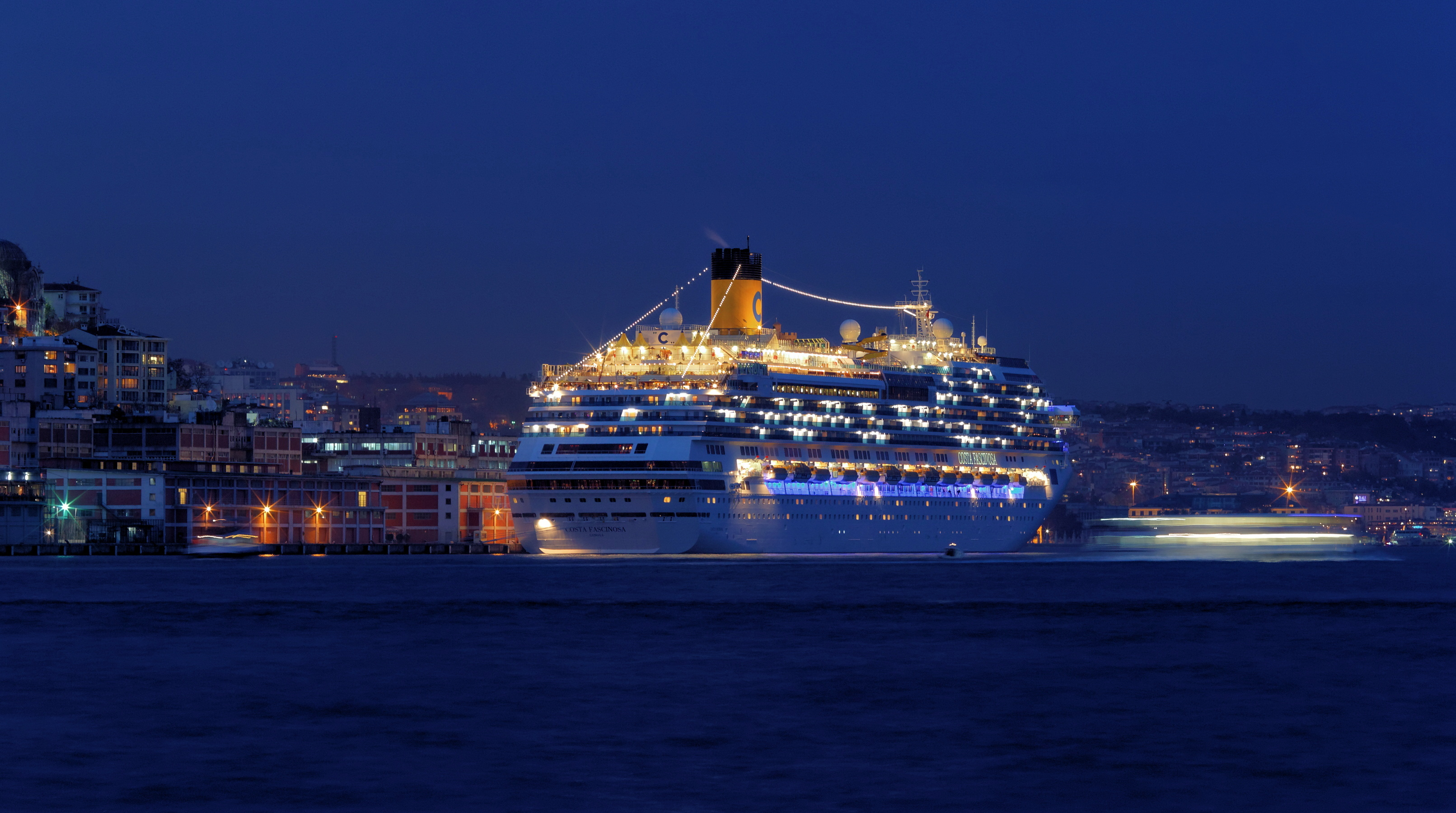
Costa Fascinosa at night in Istanbul

Costa Fascinosa and sister ship Costa Favolosa were ordered in October 2007 as part of a 2.4 billion euro expansion of the Costa Crociere fleet, with five ships entering service between 2009 and 2012 to increase the company's passenger capacity by 50%. Costa Fascinosa cost 510 million euro to build.

The names of the two ships were selected via competition. The first phase saw 16,000 pairs of names submitted by travel agents and their customers from around the world, after being asked to suggest names as part of the send us a sea of names project. These names were to evoke the idea that the ships were "magical" and "glamorous" places. 25 name pairs were shortlisted and placed on the company's website, where over 42,000 visitors voted on their favourite. Favolosa (Italian for "fabulous") and Fascinosa ("fascinating" or "glamorous") were selected as the winning name pair.

The vessel is based on the Concordia-class design already in service with Costa Crociere. Upon completion, the vessel measured 114,500 gross tons. She carries up to 3,780 passengers in 1,506 cabins; six more than previous Concordia-class ships.

Costa Fascinosa is the sixteenth ship in service with Costa Crociere. She was laid down on 3 September 2010 and was delivered to Costa Cruises on 5 May 2012.

== Operational history ==
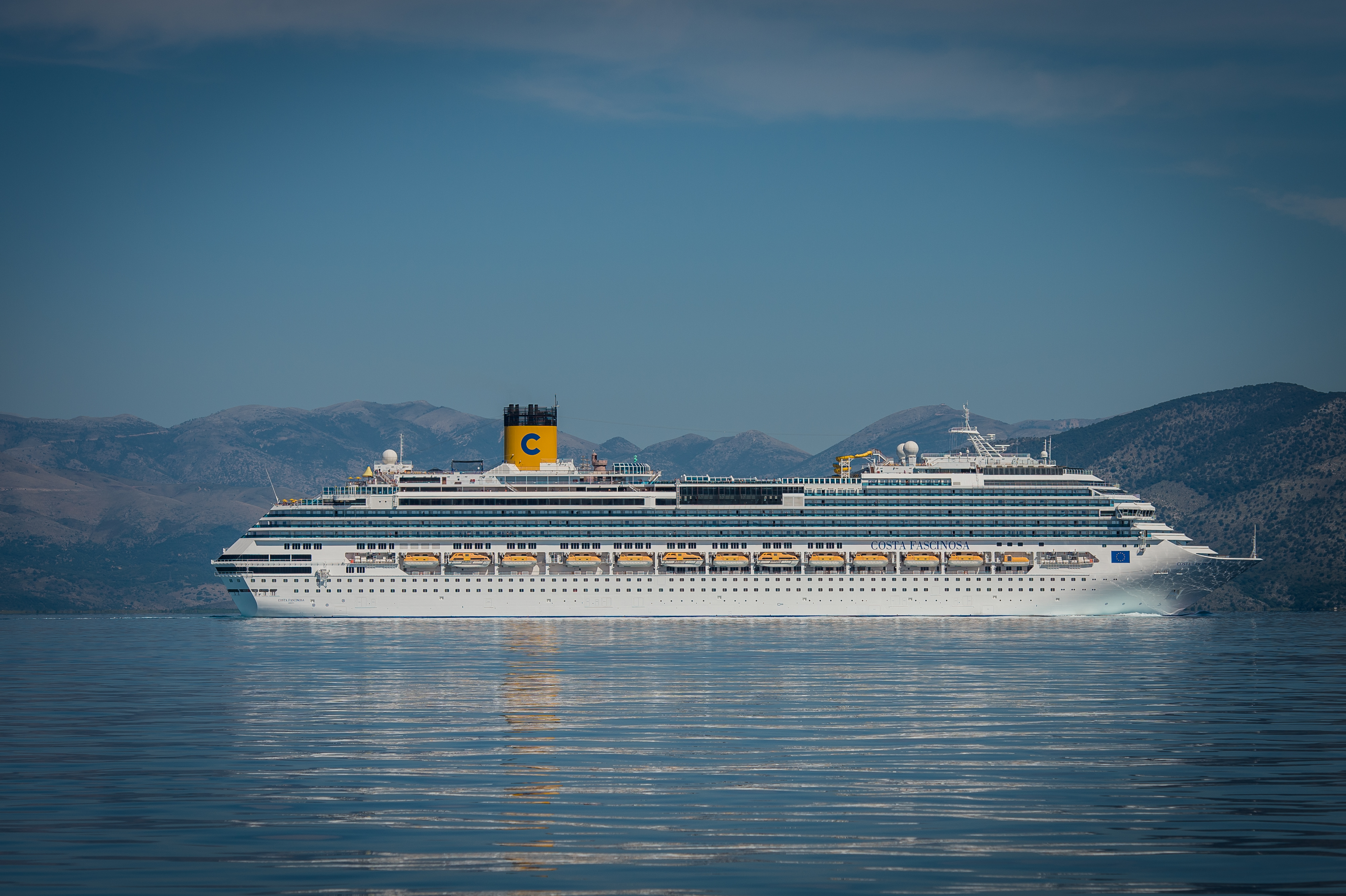
Costa Fascinosa close to Corfu.

Costa Fascinosa entered service on 6 May 2012, sailing on a preview cruise before entering regular service on 11 May, cruising to the eastern Mediterranean. She was transferred to South America in November 2012, before returning to the eastern Mediterranean for the summer 2013 season.

=== Bardo National Museum attack ===
On 18 March 2015, Costa Fascinosa was in port along with MSC Splendida in Tunis when gunmen opened fire on tourists at the Bardo National Museum, including several on a tour bus from Costa Fascinosa. Five passengers from the ship were killed, eight passengers were injured.

=== 2020 COVID-19 pandemic ===
On 11 April 2020, after the disembarkation of the ship, 19 crew members tested positive of COVID-19. On 16 April, the head doctor of the cruise ship died, and as of 21 April, a crew member also died in Brazil hospital.
