= Costa Favolosa =

Concordia-class cruise ship

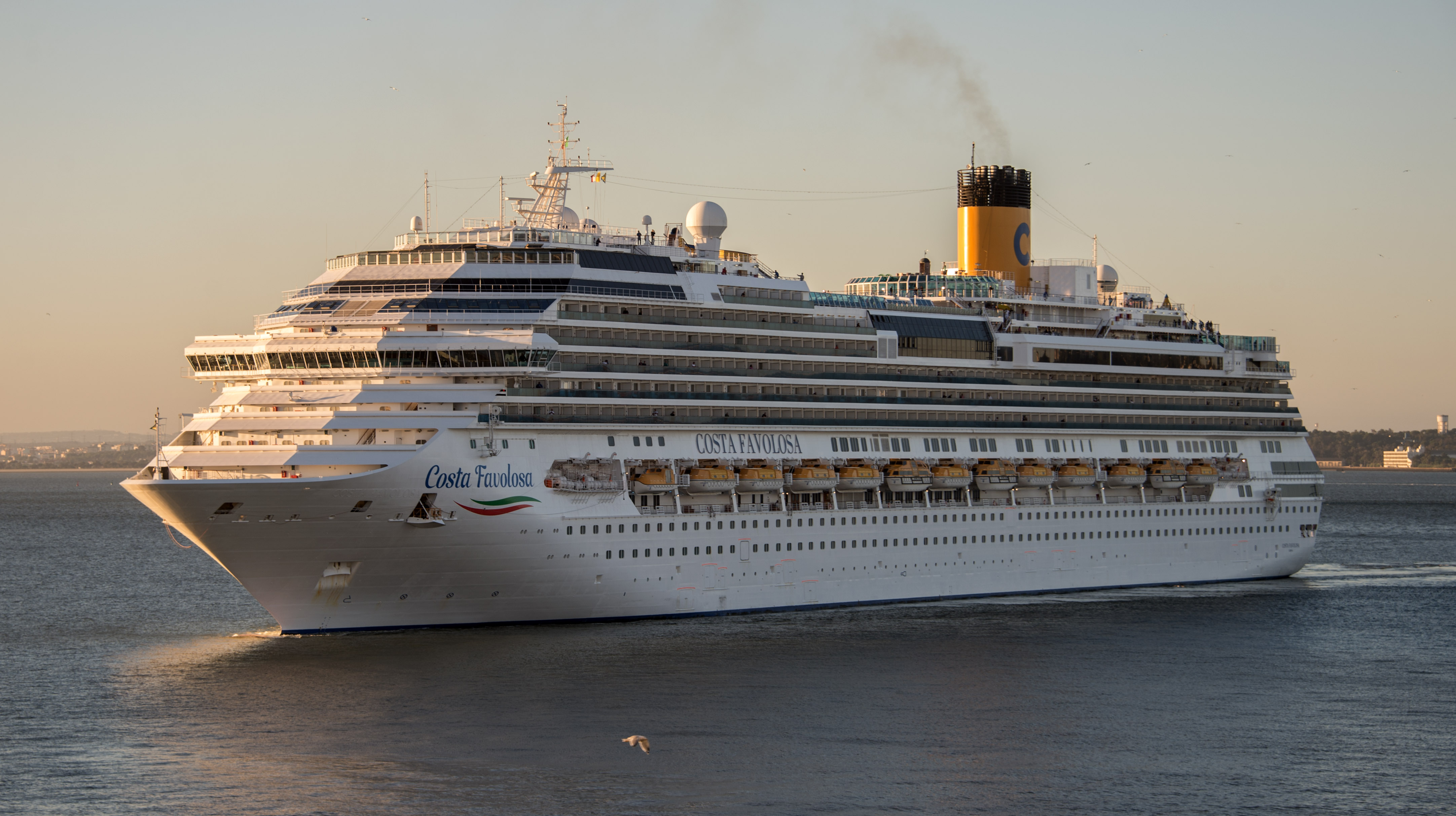
- Costa Favolosa at Barcelona

History
- Name: Costa Favolosa
- Owner: Carnival Corporation & plc
- Operator: Costa Crociere
- Port of registry: Savona, Italy
- Ordered: October 2007
- Builder: Fincantieri, Marghera, Venice
- Cost: €510 million
- Laid down: 5 November 2009
- Launched: 6 August 2010
- Christened: 2 July 2011
- Maiden voyage: 4 July 2011
- In service: 4 July 2011
- Identification: Call sign: ICPK; IMO number: 9479852; MMSI number: 247311100
- Status: In service

General characteristics
- Class & type: Modified Concordia-class cruise ship
- Tonnage: 113,216 GT
- Length: 290 m (951 ft 5 in)
- Beam: 40 m (131 ft 3 in)
- Draught: 8.5 m (27 ft 11 in)
- Depth: 14.18 m (46 ft 6 in)
- Decks: 13
- Propulsion: Diesel-electric: Two shafts: 2 fixed pitch propellers
- Speed: 24 knots (44 km/h; 28 mph)
- Capacity: 3,780 passengers
- Crew: 1,110

Costa Favolosa is a cruise ship operated by Italian cruise line Costa Crociere, ordered in October 2007. Based on the Concordia-class design, Costa Favolosa was laid down by Fincantieri's Marghera shipyard on 5 November 2009 and launched on 6 August 2010. Part of a five-ship expansion of the Costa Crociere fleet, the vessel entered service in July 2011.

== Design and description ==
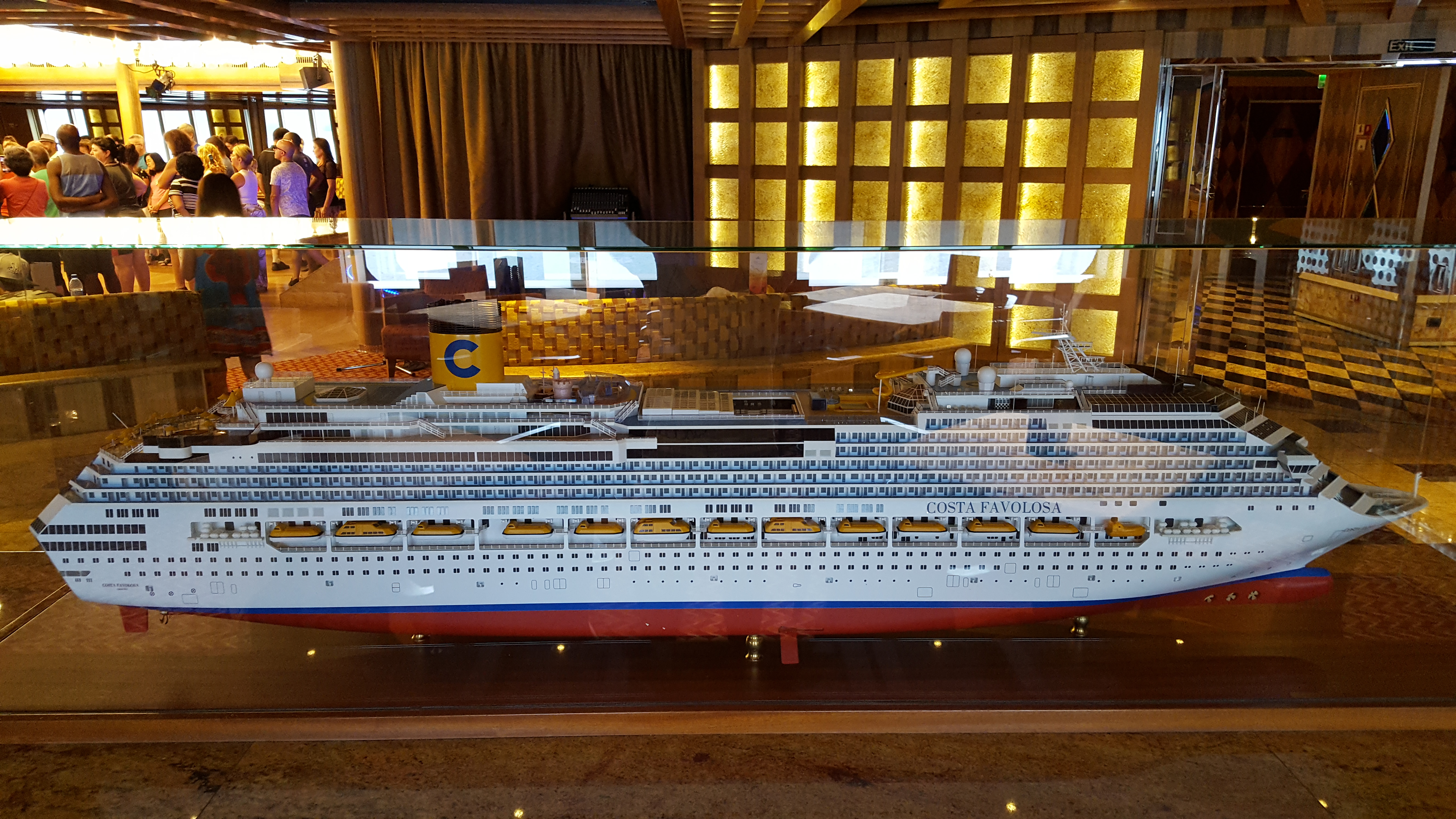
Model replica of Costa Favolosa

Costa Favolosa horn sound

The vessel is based on the Concordia-class design already in service with Costa Crociere. At 114,500 GT, she can carry up to 3,800 passengers in 1,506 cabins; six more than previous Concordia-class ships.

== Construction and career ==
Costa Favolosa and sister ship costa Fascinosa were ordered in October 2007 as part of a €2.4 billion expansion of the Costa Crociere fleet, with five ships entering service between 2009 and 2012 to increase the company's passenger capacity by 50%. Costa Favolosa cost €510 million to build.

The names of the two ships were selected via competition. The first phase saw 16,000 pairs of names submitted by travel agents and their customers from around the world, after being asked to suggest names. These names were to evoke the idea that the ships were magical and glamorous places. 25 name pairs were shortlisted and placed on the company's website, where over 42,000 visitors voted on their favourite. Favolosa (Italian for "fabulous") and Fascinosa ("fascinating" or "glamorous") were selected as the winning name pair.

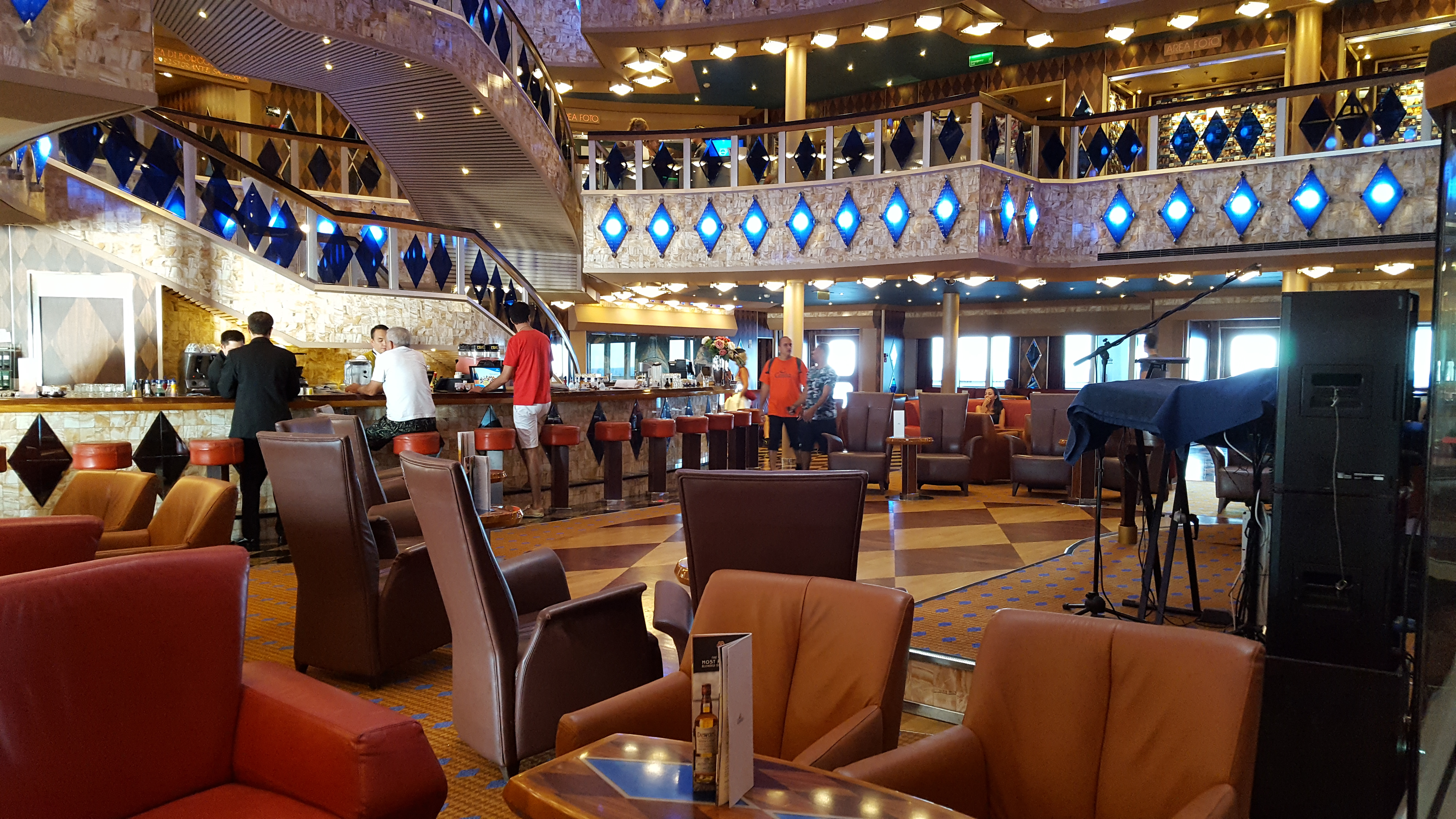
The Costa Favolosa Diamanti Bar

The first section of the cruise ship was laid down at Fincantieri's Marghera shipyard on 5 November 2009. The ship was launched from the builder's dry dock on 6 August 2010. Costa Favolosa is the fifteenth ship in service with Costa Crociere.

=== COVID-19 pandemic ===
In March 2020 during the COVID-19 pandemic, the ship departed from Guadeloupe. Six of the disembarked occupants of the ship tested positive for COVID-19. On 26 March, as the ship stopped three miles (4.8 km) offshore from Miami, Florida, the United States Coast Guard reported the evacuation of seven sick crew members, out of the 1,009 who stayed aboard.

An update by CNN on 3 April stated that the ship was then docked near Miami. Seven crew members and the sick passengers had been evacuated. Other passengers had disembarked in Guadeloupe. On 8 April an Indian crew member died from the disease after the ship was disembarked and was sent into Miami Hospital on 29 March. On 8 May it was reported that four of the 78 Belgian nationals who were vacationing on the ship had died.
