= HackMIT =

Hackathon at the Massachusetts Institute of Technology

- 2021 wordmark

- 2021 logo
- Genre: Hackathon
- Locations: Massachusetts Institute of Technology, Cambridge, Massachusetts, USA
- Founded: 2012
- Website: www.hackmit.org

HackMIT is an annual student-run hackathon held in the fall at the Massachusetts Institute of Technology.

== History ==
=== HackMIT ===
The first HackMIT had around 150 attendees and took place in February 2013 at the Stata Center as part of MIT's Techfair, a technology fair and corporate expo for MIT students. The event was open to college students of the Northeastern United States and had Techfair and Palantir as its title sponsors.

=== HackMIT 2013 ===
HackMIT was also held in September 2013 with 1000 attendees. The event featured Tom Lehman of Genius (formerly Rap Genius) as a keynote speaker and Sequoia Capital as the event's title sponsor.

=== HackMIT 2014 ===
In October, HackMIT 2014 invited 1000 undergraduates as well as Adora Cheung, then-CEO of Homejoy, and Alexis Ohanian, co-founder of Reddit, as keynotes. Highlighted sponsors of HackMIT 2014 were Amadeus, Google, and Uber.

=== HackMIT 2015 ===
HackMIT 2015's theme was experimentation, and teams built projects ranging from an Apple Watch air guitar to computer vision analysis tools for security camera footage. Keynote speakers this year included Liz Fosslien, author of webcomic Out of the Office, and Jack Conte, musician and co-founder of Patreon.

=== HackMIT 2016 ===
The 2016 event focused on inclusivity and featured a random lottery admissions process combined with selected application reading. Keynote speakers included Sanjit Biswas, co-founder of Samsara and Meraki, Inc., and Dina Katabi, MIT professor and director of the MIT Center for Wireless Networks and Mobile Computing.

=== HackMIT 2017 ===
HackMIT was held in September 2017, and over 1200 hackers came together from all around the world. Keynote speakers included Steve Huffman, co-founder and CEO of Reddit and Kyle Vogt, Founder and CEO of Cruise Automation.

== Projects ==
Over the years, HackMIT has seen a wide variety of hacks, ranging from new web and mobile app concepts to novel hardware/software interfaces to machine learning and computer vision projects. In particular, HackMIT emphasizes building working prototypes rather than business plans or ideas, and participants are encouraged to be open about the technical challenges they faced in the judging process.

Some notable projects from past HackMIT events include:

- Lean On Me, a mental health platform which matches users to peer supporters
- Controlio, an app that allows users to control their computer via SMS and voice control
- Project Naptha, a browser extension software for Google Chrome that allows users to highlight, copy, edit and translate text from within images.

== Blueprint ==
The HackMIT organizing team also hosts a high school hackathon, called Blueprint, on MIT's campus in the winter. In past years, this event has featured separate learning and hacking days, with students at MIT volunteering to teach classes on introductory web and mobile app development.

== Open Source ==
HackMIT has developed open-source software for the hackathon community, releasing all of their internal and external tools on code.hackmit.org. HackMIT software like HELPq and Gavel has been used by dozens of events.

== Puzzles ==
Since 2014, HackMIT has released an annual admissions puzzle, similar to an online puzzlehunt that guarantees admission to the first 50 teams.
