= Adora =

Adora may refer to:

- Adora (given name)
- Adora (Apocrypha), a town mentioned in the Apocrypha
- Adora, Har Hevron, an Israeli settlement on the West Bank
- Adora (singer), South Korean singer-songwriter
- Adora, a novel by Bertrice Small
- Princess Adora, the alter ego of the superheroine She-Ra
- "Adora", a song by Indochine from the album Alice & June
- Adora Magic City, a ship of Carnival China Adora Cruises
- Adora, a hero monkey from the Bloons Tower Defense franchise.
