= SPP =

SPP or spp may refer to:

== Businesses ==
- ShowBiz Pizza Place, a former chain of pizza restaurants
- Sigmund Pulsometer Pumps, a British engineering company
- Slovenský plynárenský priemysel, a Slovak natural gas company
- Sumitomo Precision Products, an aerospace and sensor manufacturer

== Gaming ==
- Sucker Punch Productions, an American video game developer
- SuperPoke! Pets, an online game app
- Super Princess Peach, a 2006 video game

== Organizations ==
=== Government bodies ===
- Saskatchewan Pension Plan, a government-run pension plan in Canada
- Security and Prosperity Partnership of North America, between Canada, Mexico and the United States
- Protection and Guard Service (Romanian: Serviciul de Protecţie şi Pază), Romania

=== Learned societies ===
- Paris Psychoanalytic Society, France
- Society for Philosophy and Psychology, North America

=== Political parties ===
- Justice and Reconciliation Party (Stranka pravde i pomirenja), a political party in Serbia and Montenegro
- Party of Justice and Trust (Serbo-Croatian: Stranka pravde i povjerenja), Bosnia and Herzegovina
- Singapore People's Party, Singapore
- Socialist People's Party (disambiguation)
- Stonoga Polish Party, Poland
- Swaziland Progressive Party, Eswatini
- Swedish People's Party of Finland, Finland

=== Other organizations ===
- Southwest Power Pool, an American power-grid non-profit
- Stowarzyszenie Pisarzy Polskich, a Polish cultural institute for writers

== Policies, protocols, processes, and programs ==
- Screening Partnership Program, a program where airports in the United States can use private screening agencies instead of the TSA
- Share purchase plan, a means of buying shares in a company
- Specific physical preparedness, the status of being prepared for the movements in a specific activity
- State Partnership Program, protocol used by the National Guard of the United States
- Street Performer Protocol, a way of encouraging the creation of creative works in the public domain

== Science and technology ==
=== Computing and networking ===
- Sequenced Packet Protocol, a network transport-layer protocol promulgated by Xerox
- Serial Port Profile, a Bluetooth wireless-interface profile
- Software Protection Platform, a Microsoft Windows license-validation module
- Standard parallel port, a back-formed name for the original Centronics mode of parallel port after introduction of EPP and ECP modes

=== Physics ===
- Self-propelled particles, a concept used in statistical physics to describe swarm behaviour
- Spiral Phase Plate, regarding angular momentum and light
- Surface plasmon polariton, a type of polariton from strong coupling of plasmons to electromagnetic waves

=== Other uses in science and technology ===
- Science Power Platform, a planned Russian module of the International Space Station
- spp. (from Latin: species pluralis), in biological taxonomy
- Single Point Positioning, a method used in GPS systems
- Solar power plant, a large-scale power generating system

== Other uses ==
- Steyr SPP, a model of pistol
- Sam Powell-Pepper, an Australian rules football player

== See also ==
- SPP1 (disambiguation)
