= Margaritaville at Sea Islander =

Cruise ship, launched 1999

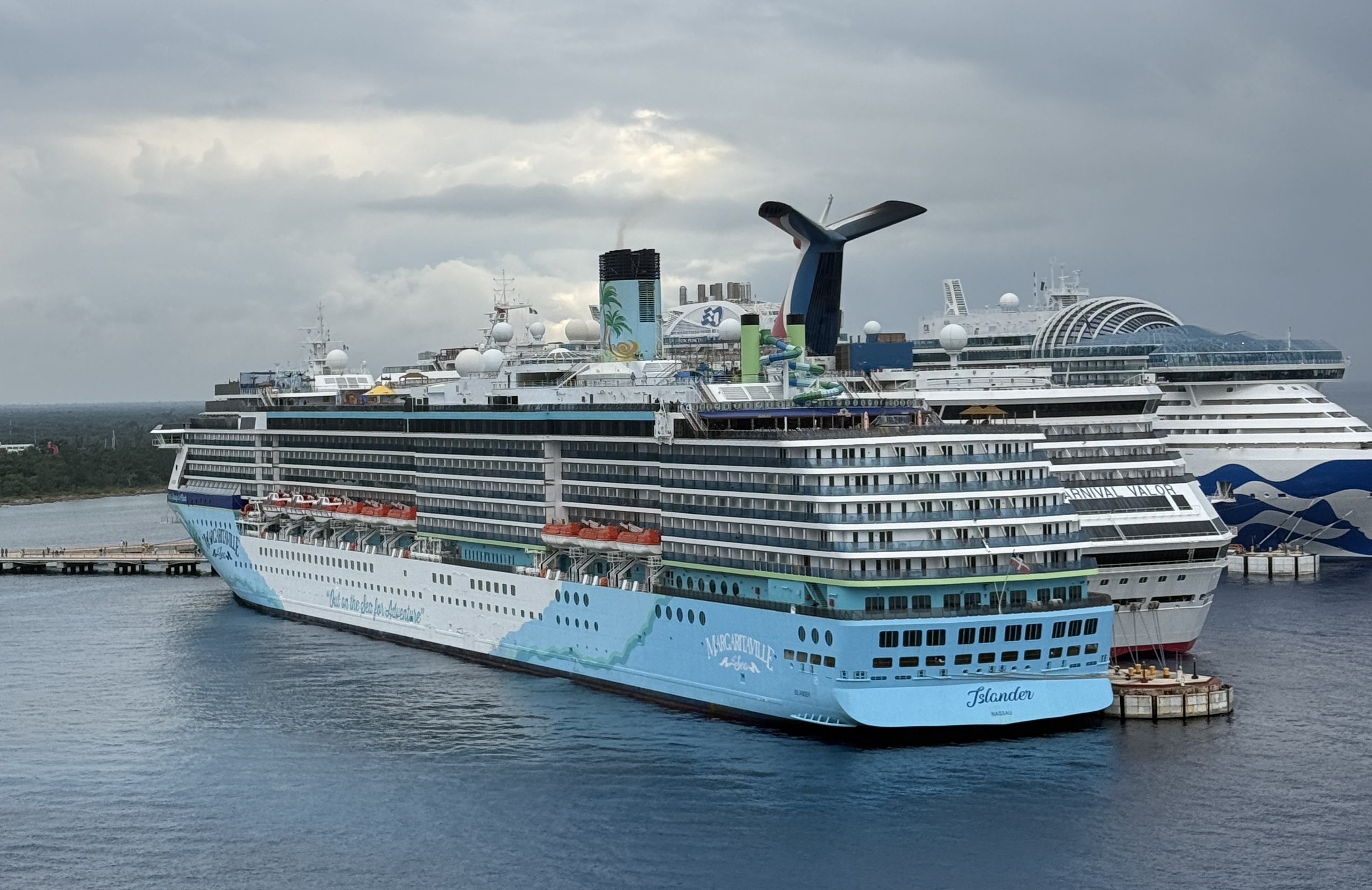
- Margaritaville at Sea Islander in Cozumel, 2024

History

Bahamas
- Name: Costa Atlantica (2000–2023); Margaritaville at Sea Islander (2023–present)
- Owner: Carnival Corporation (2000–2023); Paradise Cruise Line Operator Ltd (2023–present)
- Operator: Costa Cruises (2000–2019); Adora Cruises (never operated); Margaritaville at Sea (2024–present)
- Port of registry: Italy, Genoa (2000–2021); Bahamas, Nassau (2021–present)
- Builder: Helsinki New Shipyard, Finland
- Yard number: 498
- Launched: 11 November 1999
- Sponsored by: Claudia Cardinale (Costa Atlantica); Savannah Buffett (Margaritaville at Sea Islander)
- Christened: 17 July 2000 (as Costa Atlantica); 10 June 2024 (as Margaritaville at Sea Islander)
- Acquired: 30 June 2000
- Maiden voyage: 17 July 2000 (as Costa Atlantica); 14 June 2024 (as Margaritaville at Sea Islander)
- In service: 17 July 2000 (Costa Cruises); 14 June 2024 (Margaritaville at Sea)
- Identification: IMO number: 9187796; Call sign: C6FB7; MMSI no.: 311001063
- Status: In service

General characteristics
- Class & type: Spirit-class cruise ship
- Tonnage: 85,619 GT; 53,437 NT; 7,500 DWT
- Length: 292.56 m (959 ft 10 in)
- Beam: 32.2 m (105 ft 8 in)
- Draught: 7.8 m (25 ft 7 in)
- Installed power: 6 × Wärtsilä 9R46; 63,370 kW (combined)
- Speed: 22 knots (41 km/h; 25 mph)
- Capacity: 2,114 passengers; 2,680 at full occupancy
- Crew: 897

Margaritaville at Sea Islander is a Spirit-class cruise ship operated by Margaritaville at Sea. Previously sailing for Costa Cruises as Costa Atlantica, she was built in 2000 by the Kvaerner Masa-Yards Helsinki New Shipyard in Helsinki and delivered in 2000. Costa Atlantica was sold to CSSC Carnival Cruise Shipping in 2019, but the ship never entered service with the line. She was later sold to Margaritaville at Sea and began service in June 2024.

== Design and construction ==
Costa Atlantica, unveiled in 2000, was one of four Costa ships built during the 2000s that were designed with magrodome-covered pool areas and other features that would allow travel to a wide array of destinations. The ship also had the same platform as sister line Carnival's four Spirit-class ships. The ship is 85,619 tons with a capacity for 2,114 passengers with a length of 292.5 m (959 ft 8 in) and a 38.8 m (127 ft 4 in) maximum breadth. Each passenger deck on Costa Atlantica was named after a movie by the Italian director Federico Fellini. She was decorated with Carrara marble, Murano glass accents, and in-laid mosaic tiling, as with Costa Luminosa. She also replicated Venice's Caffè Florian.

== Costa Cruises ==
The ship entered service with Costa in 2000, with Caribbean itineraries during the northern winter, European cruises in the summer, and in the East Coast United States and Canada area during spring and fall. Costa Atlantica sailed on 46-day voyage from Tianjin International Cruise Terminal on 30 November 2016, with more than 2,000 passengers across the two continents, and visiting 12 islands in nine countries, the first cruise from China to the South Pacific Islands.

In November 2018 the intention to sell Costa Atlantica in late 2019 to CSSC Carnival Cruise Shipping was announced, a new joint venture to provide Chinese cruise travelers with their own cruise line. The transfer to the new company was on 12 January 2020 but the ship never entered service and was resold in 2023. Her sister ship Costa Mediterranea did, however, enter service as Mediterranea for the new company, by then named Adora Cruises.

== Margaritaville at Sea ==
The sale of Costa Atlantica to Margaritaville at Sea was confirmed on 16 October 2023 by Carnival Corporation. On 4 December, Margaritaville at Sea revealed that the ship would receive a total makeover before entering service in June 2024. All 1,100 staterooms would be refurbished, as well as the ship's atrium, lido deck and restaurants. Familiar features that debuted on Margaritaville at Sea Paradise would also be featured. Renamed Margaritaville at Sea Islander, the ship began a four-month refit in January 2024 at the Harland & Wolff shipyard, Belfast.

Margaritaville at Sea Islander left Belfast on 19 May 2024 for Tampa, Florida, and commenced her first cruise on 14 June, starting her programme of alternating 4- and 5-night cruises from Tampa to Key West, then Cozumel and Progreso, Yucatán in Mexico. The ship's godmother is Savannah Buffett, daughter of Margaritaville founder Jimmy Buffett.

== Incidents ==
In 2010 Francesco Schettino, later the captain of the Costa Concordia, was the captain of Costa Atlantica as it entered the port of Warnemünde, Germany, at too high a speed, allegedly causing damage to AIDAblu, also a Carnival Corporation ship.

=== Coronavirus pandemic ===
During the coronavirus pandemic, on 20 April 2020, a positive case was reported aboard Costa Atlantica when it was docked at Koyagi Factory of Mitsubishi Heavy Industries' Nagasaki Shipyard in Nagasaki, where it was under repairs from 20 February to 25 March. (Note: The ship was originally scheduled for repairs in China, but the repair order was transferred to Mitsubishi Heavy Industries after the pandemic began in China.) A doctor had collected samples from four suspected cases and conducted PCR tests, with three negative results and one positive. The positive case had suffered a fever beginning on 14 April. About 20 other crew members had started developing fevers in the week before the first case was reported.

Costa Atlantica had 623 crew members of 36 different nationalities, including a Japanese translator and no passengers at the time the first positive case was first reported. There were a total of 56 crew members that have had heavy contact with the positive case. They have all been quarantined, and PCR tests have been planned for all of them. The prefecture has considered requesting assistance from the Self-Defense Forces to help manage the situation.

On 22 April 2020, officials of the prefecture announced that, of the 56 additional tests conducted, an additional 33 crew members had tested positive, bringing the total number of positive cases to 34. The other 23 tests returned negative. On 23 April, it was announced that 48 tests in total have returned positive, with 14 of the positive cases being cooks or people serving food. On 24 April, officials stated that 91 people had tested positive, with one patient being hospitalized. Officials also noted that even though Costa Atlantica had been quarantined upon its arrival in Japan, with its crew ordered not to leave the quay unless they needed to visit a hospital, some crew members had left without informing the officials. On 25 April, Television Nagasaki announced that 57 new cases had been discovered, bringing the total number of positive cases to 148. With the latest cases count at 149, the ship left Nagasaki port on 31 May, bound for Manila.
