= Gran Caffè Schenardi =

Cafè in Naples

Coordinates: 42.41813°N 12.10620°E

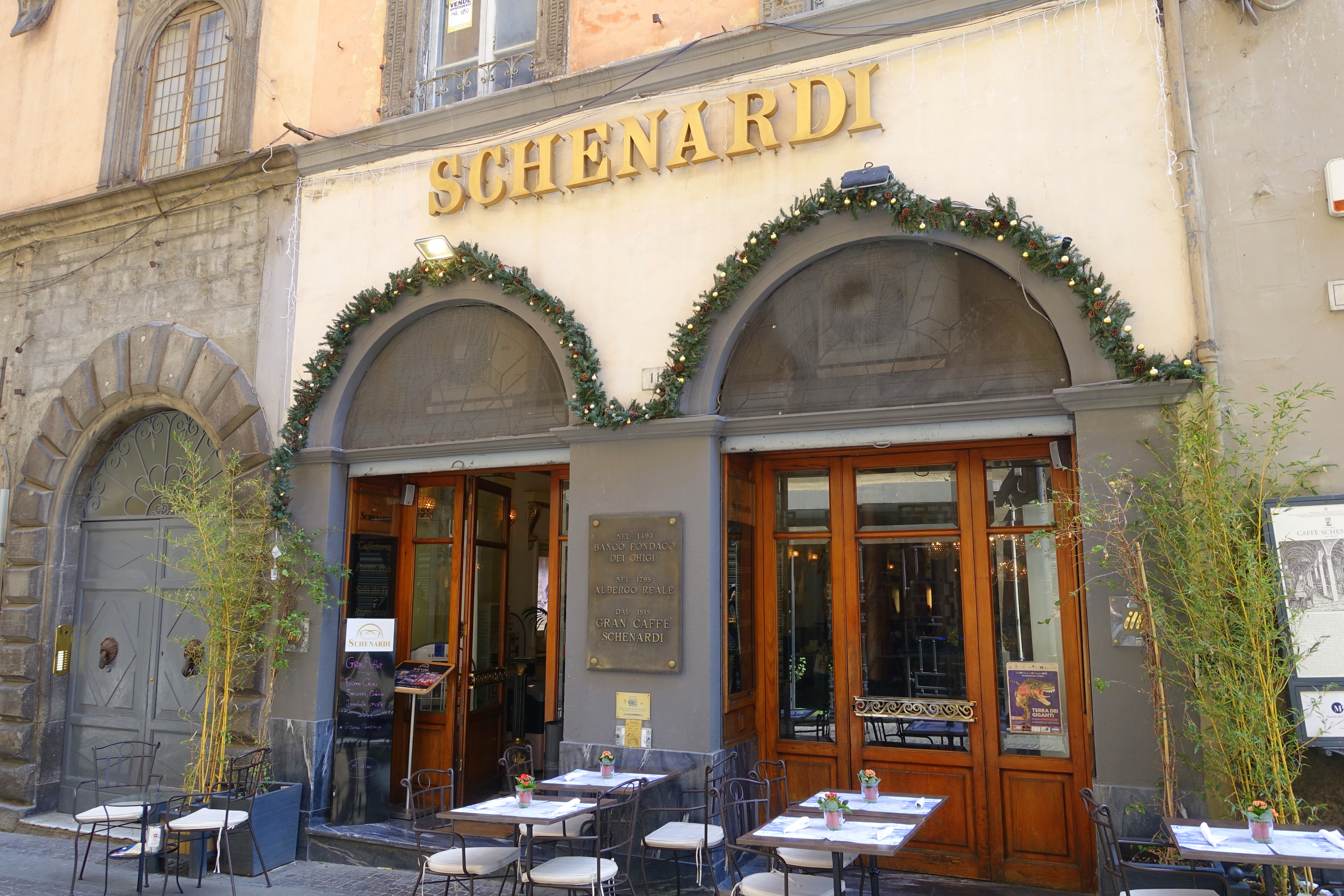
Facade of Coffeehouse

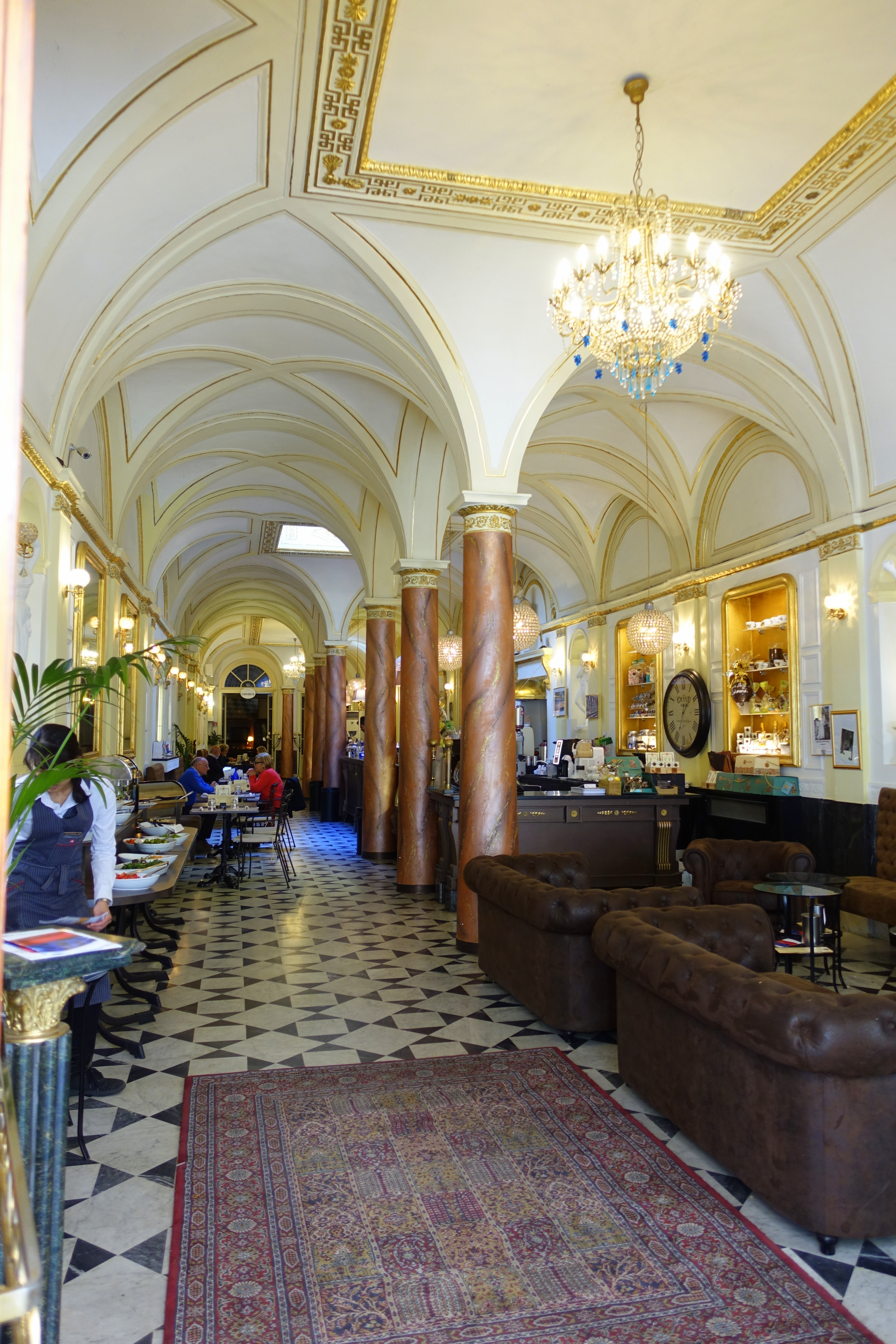
Interior of coffeehouse

The Gran Caffè Schenardi is a historic, private cafe or coffeehouse located on Corso Italia #11 in Central Viterbo, Italy on via Chiaia. It is located just off Piazza delle Erbe with its Fountain of the Lions.

== History ==
The facade has a plaque stating the site was a bank and trading house in 1493, and later an inn, and finally in 1818, the coffeehouse was opened by Raffaele Schenardi after he bought the hotel. The 15th-century building had belonged to Girolamo da Carbognano, secretary of the comune, from 1489 al 1493, when it became a warehouse and bank (a trading house) for the prominent Chigi family until 1528. Subsequent owners included the Boninsegna and Bonelli, whose families' coat of arms share a shield over the adjacent portals. By 1798, it was purchased by Giuseppe Cassani, a merchant of postal services, who converted the site into the Albergo Reale (Royal Inn).

Raffaele Schenardi created the coffeehouse that became a prominent and fashionable meeting-place in town. By the mid-19th-century, this became a site for discussion of the republican and patriotic Italian ambitions. It sponsored meetings of the Circolo popolare di Viterbo, which discussed political events, by discussing recent publications and journal articles. However, the clientele of the Caffè was not solely revolutionary, but it appeared to be also frequented by Papal and French troops. Over time, it augmented its food service. An advertisement in 1851 offered for the price of 13 Baiocchi (approximately equivalent to shillings) a complete menu consisting of a good soup, boiled meat, and two other dishes with bread, wine, fruit and cheese. It appears the premises were regularly raided by the authorities to enforce a curfew at midnight. In 1855, the interiors we still see, were commissioned by Vincenzo Schenardi with a renovation directed by the architect Virginio Vespignani.

The Caffè was renown for its pastries and ice cream, and over the decades hosted prominent persons from Garibaldi, Guglielmo Marconi, the Savoyard monarchs, Mussolini, Orson Welles, and Federico Fellini. Since the second World War, it has changed ownership. Since the COVID epidemic circa 2020, the business has struggled to remain open.

In December 1980, the Ministry of Environmental Cultural Heritage declared the Gran Caffe Schenardi of particular historical and artistic interest; a status enjoyed by other such institutions such as the Caffè Gambrinus in Naples, Caffè Florian in Venice, Caffè Greco of Rome, Caffè Fiorio of Turin, Caffè Paszkowski of Florence, and Caffè Pedrocchi in Padua.
