= Adora Mediterranea =

Cruise ship built in 2003

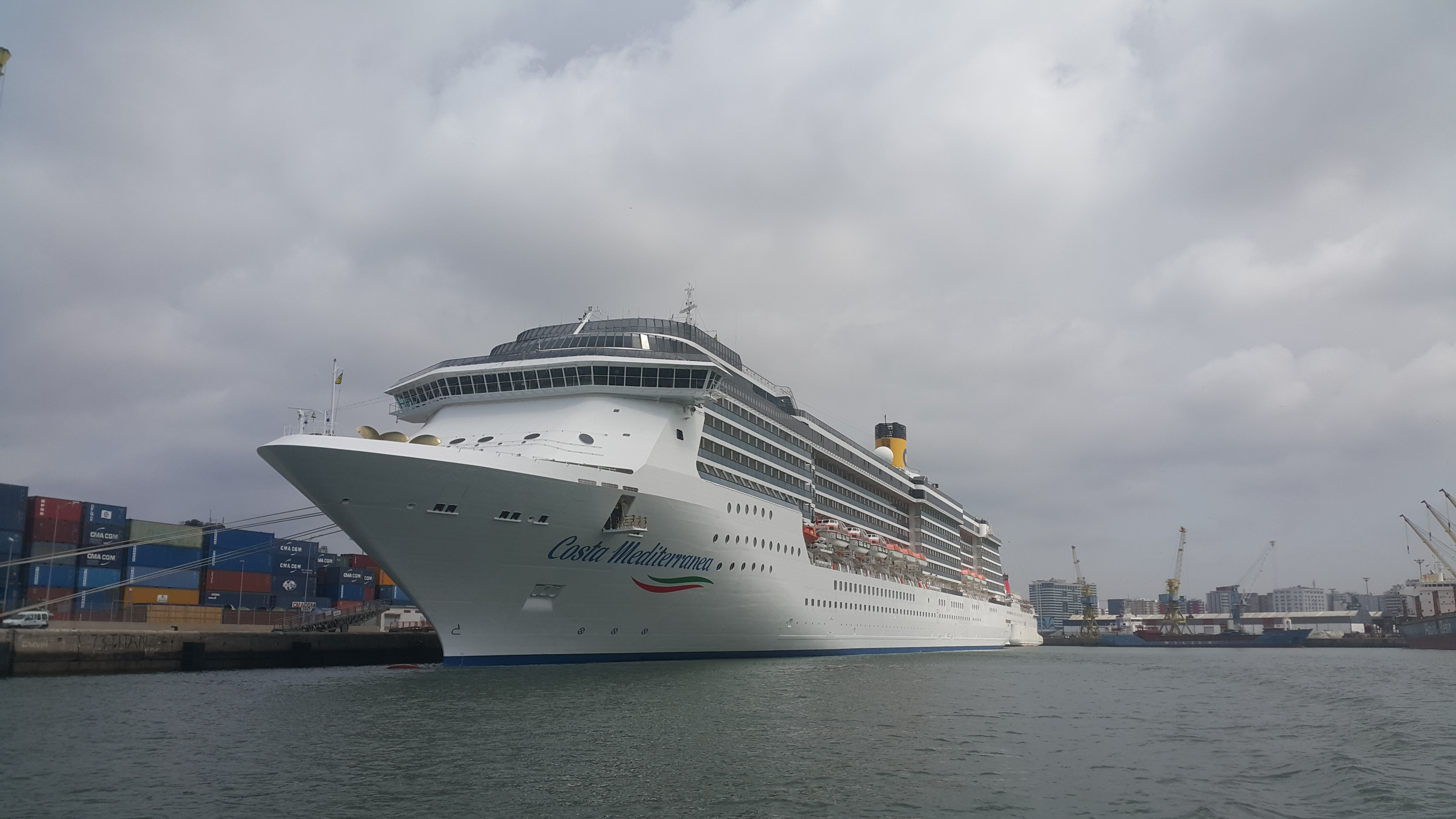
- Adora Mediterranea as Costa Mediterranea in Port of Casablanca, Morocco on May 6, 2018

History

Bahamas
- Name: Costa Mediterranea (2003–2023); Mediterranea (2023–2024); Adora Mediterranea (2024–present)
- Owner: Carnival Corporation & plc (2003-2023); Adora Cruises (2023-present)
- Operator: Costa Cruises (2003-2021); Adora Cruises (2023-present)
- Port of registry: Italy, Genoa (2003-2021); Bahamas, Nassau (2021-present)
- Route: Cruising from Tianjin, China on international routes (2023-present)
- Builder: Kværner Masa-Yards; Helsinki New Shipyard, Finland
- Yard number: 502
- Laid down: 1 October 2000
- Completed: 27 May 2003
- Maiden voyage: 16 June 2003
- In service: 2003-Present
- Identification: IMO number: 9237345; Call sign: IBCF (2003), C6FE7 (2023); MMSI number: 311001086 (2023)
- Status: In active service

General characteristics
- Class & type: Spirit-class cruise ship
- Tonnage: 85,619 GT; 53,437 NT; 7,500 DWT
- Length: 292.5 m (959 ft 8 in)
- Beam: 32.2 m (105 ft 8 in)
- Draught: 8 m (26 ft 3 in)
- Depth: 13.6 m (44 ft 7 in)
- Decks: 12
- Propulsion: Twin propellers
- Speed: 24 knots (44 km/h; 28 mph)
- Capacity: 2,114 passengers (normal); 2,680 passengers (maximum)
- Crew: 912

Adora Mediterranea is a Spirit-class cruise ship operated by Adora Cruises in the Chinese market. She was built in 2003 in Finland as Costa Mediterranea for Carnival Corporation & plc's Costa Cruises brand, and began operating with Adora Cruises in 2023 as Mediterranea, then as Adora Mediterranea beginning in 2024.

== Costa Line ==
Costa Mediterranea was launched on 24 September 2002, and completed on 22 May 2003 at the Kvaerner Masa-Yards' Helsinki New Shipyard, Finland at a cost of over €400 million. Like sister ship Costa Atlantica, her design was derived from Carnival Cruise Line's Spirit-class ships. She was christened by Spanish model and actress Inés Sastre, and on 16 June 2003 departed on her maiden voyage from Genoa to Spain and Portugal. The twelve decks were named after mythological and historical characters: Circe, Tersicore, Bacco, Teseo, Orfeo, Narciso, Prometeo, Pegaso, Armonia, Cleopatra, Pandora and Medea.

On 10 September 2008, Costa Mediterranea was the first ship to call at the new passenger port in Saint Petersburg, Russia.

Costa Mediterranea was dry docked for a €4 million refurbishment at the Fincantieri shipyard in Palermo from 21 November to 4 December 2013.

== Adora Cruises ==
In 2021, Costa Mediterranea was transferred to CSSC Carnival Cruise Shipping. Renamed Mediterranea in 2023, the ship entered service in September that year under CSSC Carnival's brand Adora Cruises, sailing short international itineraries based at Tianjin. Renamed Adora Mediterranea in July 2024, the ship is scheduled to transfer to Nansha, Guangzhou as home port in December.

On 14 August 2024, in the port of Jeju, South Korea, the ship suffered a fire in a mechanical space, and three crewmembers were injured by smoke inhalation. After the fire was extinguished, inspections delayed the departure until the following day, and the scheduled call at Fukuoka, Japan was cancelled.
