= Adora (given name) =

Adora is a feminine given name.

== People ==
- Adora Andrews (1872–1956), American actress
- Adora Cheung, American software developer
- Adora Dei, keyboardist in the house band for The Eric Andre Show
- Adora Oleh, British-born Nigerian television presenter
- Adora Svitak (b. 1997), American writer

== Fictional characters ==
- Adora (1980), a novel by Bertrice Small
- Adora Belle Dearheart, a character in Terry Pratchett's Discworld series (1983–2015)
- Adora Crellin, a character in Gillian Flynn's book Sharp Objects (2006)
- Princess Adora, real name of She-Ra, the title character from the 1985 series She-Ra: Princess of Power and its 2018 reboot She-Ra and the Princesses of Power
