= Adora Magic City =

Cruise ship

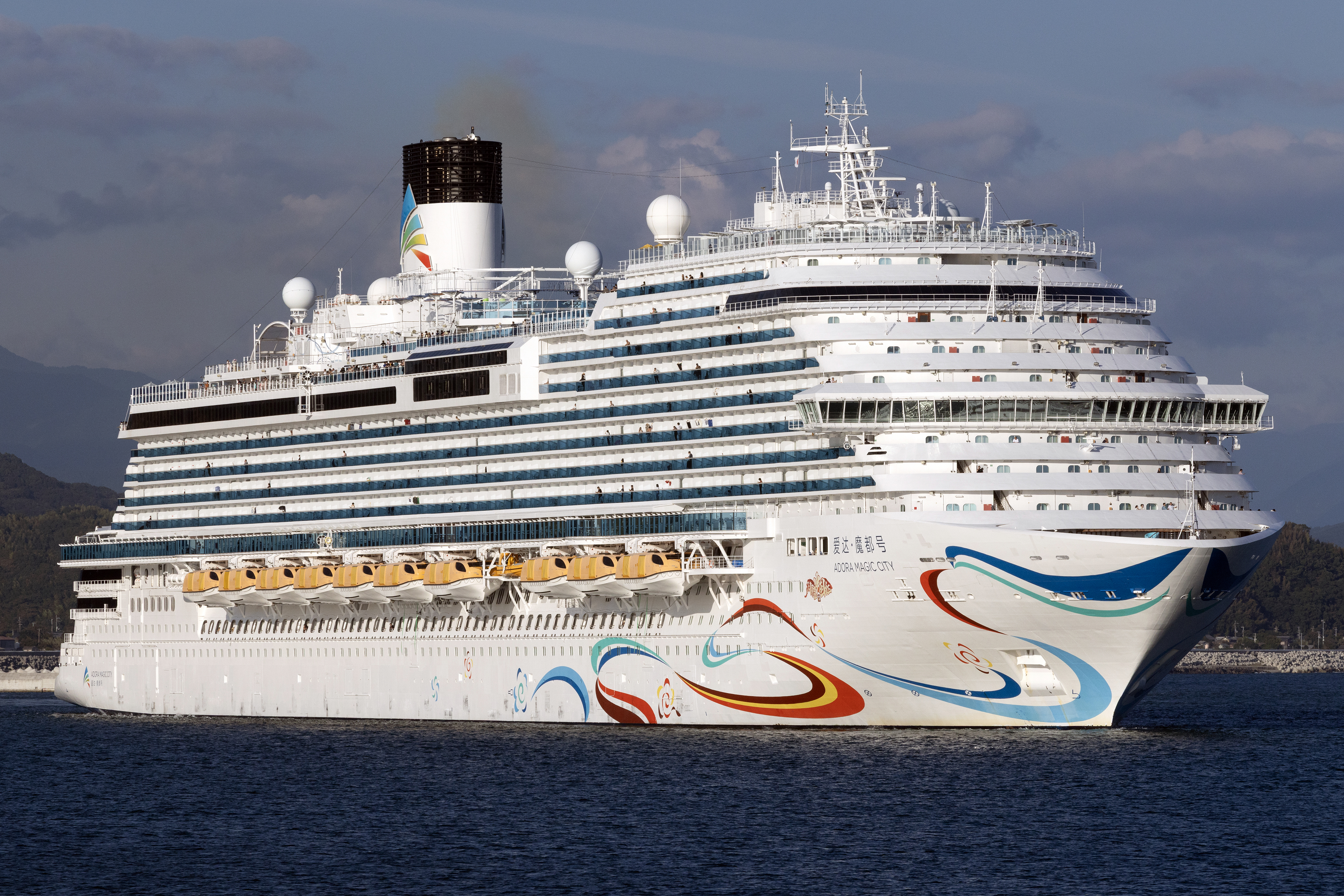
- Adora Magic City in Kōchi Port, 2025

History
- Name: Adora Magic City
- Owner: Carnival Corporation & plc (2023); Adora Cruises (2023-present)
- Operator: Adora Cruises
- Port of registry: Panama City, Panama
- Builder: Shanghai Waigaoqiao Shipbuilding Co Ltd, Shanghai, China
- Cost: US$770 million
- Yard number: Shanghai Waigaoqiao H1508
- Laid down: 10 November 2020
- Launched: 17 December 2021
- Completed: 4 November 2023
- Maiden voyage: 1 January 2024
- Identification: Call sign: HOA2246; IMO number: 9871036; MMSI number: 352001180
- Status: In service

General characteristics
- Class & type: Vista-class cruise ship
- Tonnage: 136,201 GT
- Length: 323.6 m (1,061 ft 8 in) (overall); 287.1 m (941 ft 11 in) (LBP)
- Beam: 37.2 m (122 ft 1 in)
- Draught: 8.55 m (28 ft 1 in)
- Depth: 11.2 m (36 ft 9 in)
- Decks: 14 passenger
- Installed power: Diesel-electric 62,400 kW (83,700 hp)
- Propulsion: Two propellers
- Speed: 23 knots (43 km/h; 26 mph)
- Capacity: 5,246 passengers
- Crew: 1,200

Adora Magic City (Chinese: 愛達·魔都号) is a cruise ship operated by Asian cruise line Adora Cruises. It is a Vista-class cruise ship, the first built in China. It embarked on its first commercial voyage on 1 January 2024. At 136,201 gross tonnage (GT), it is the largest-cruise ship built in China as of 2025.
