= Homejoy =

Internet platform and company

Homejoy, Inc.
- Type: Private
- Industry: Cleaning services
- Founded: 2010; 16 years ago
- Headquarters: San Francisco, California, United States
- Key people: Adora Cheung (CEO); Aaron Cheung (VP of Growth)
- Services: Home services
- Number of employees: 100+

Homejoy, Inc. was an online platform which connected customers with home service providers, including house cleaners and handymen. The company was based in San Francisco. Homejoy served the United States, Canada, and United Kingdom for a total of over 31 major cities. It charged a variable rate of $25–$35 per hour (or £13 an hour in the UK). Homejoy shut down on July 31, 2015.

== History ==
Homejoy was founded in 2010 by siblings Adora and Aaron Cheung, who worked as CEO and VP of Growth, respectively. Originally, the company was named Pathjoy.

Co-founder Adora Cheung did the first few cleaning jobs herself, and until late 2013 continued to work at least one cleaning job per month.

Homejoy received an undisclosed amount of funding from Y Combinator in March 2010, but began operations in 2012. Paul Graham said Homejoy was the fastest growing Y Combinator company.

The company raised another $1.7 million in seed funding in early 2013. The seed investors included Andreessen Horowitz, First Round Capital, Resolute.VC, and other individuals and groups. Since then, there have been two other rounds of fundraising conducted by Homejoy (Series A and Series B). Series A was conducted in October 2013, and the amount invested during this round has not been publicly disclosed. After Series B, led by Google Ventures, completed in early December 2013, the total raised from both rounds was around $38 million.

In April 2014, Homejoy expanded into the United Kingdom, its first market outside North America. It charged £13 per hour, of which cleaners earned between £7 and £9.5.

On July 17, 2015, Homejoy announced that it would cease operations on July 31, 2015. The company cited difficulties in maintaining profitability, as well as lawsuits over whether its workers are contractors or employees. Google hired portions of the company's technical staff.

== Operations ==
Homejoy was run by a team of over 100 employees, and worked with thousands of independent professional cleaners in their cities of operation as of early 2014. They charged a uniform rate of $25 an hour for service. Cleanings were fully bonded, and cleaners contracting on the platform had to go through a screening process which involved third-party background checks and a certification process.

Homejoy's company culture focused on the use of technology to increase operating efficiency and offer on-demand services. Investors have also credited Homejoy for creating jobs in a slow job market by connecting their service to the demand and expanding their scope beyond traditional house cleaning companies.

== Homejoy Foundation ==
In December 2013, Homejoy announced the establishment of the Homejoy Foundation, a nonprofit organization that supports initiatives for veterans and their families.

== Controversies ==
A former employee claimed there were other reasons Homejoy shut down besides the worker classification lawsuits, including a costly international expansion and the leakage of its best workers to direct employment arrangements with its own (now former) clients. Some questioned growth of the customers by giving a steep $19 deal for the first cleaning, where other companies charge $85.

In October 2015, three months after Homejoy shut down, Aaron Cheung, the Co-Founder of Homejoy and brother of Adora Cheung, bought and used the Homejoy customer database to start a similar company, Fly Maids. Cheung admitted that he was behind the startup after a Homejoy user found his credit card and profile information on the Fly Maid site — without even signing up. Cheung decided to shut down Fly Maids after the news became public to avoid another lawsuits due to seemingly improper usage of Homejoy customer database.

== See also ==
- Handy (company)
- List of cleaning companies
- TaskRabbit
