= SPP1 =

SPP1 or SPP-1 may refer to:

- SPP-1 underwater pistol, a USSR firearm made for Soviet frogmen
- Secreted phosphoprotein 1, a human gene product
- Suppressor of Pericarp Pigmentation 1, a maize gene implied in the phlobaphene metabolic pathway
