= Adora Cheung =

American software developer

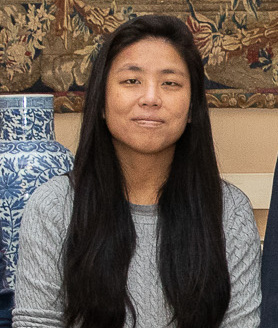
- Born: 1985 (age 40–41)
- Occupation: Founder at stealth startup
- Known for: Homejoy, Y Combinator
- Website: adoracheung.com

Adora Cheung (born 1985) is an American entrepreneur, investor, and programmer. She was the co-founder and CEO of house cleaning business Homejoy. After Homejoy shut down, Cheung continued working for Y Combinator as a partner, until February 2021.

== Early life and education ==
Cheung grew up in a small town in South Carolina and earned a bachelor's degree in Computer Science from Clemson University. She received a master's degree in Economics from the University of Rochester. While working on her PhD, a friend asked for programming help with his startup, so she left her PhD program to help him. When that didn't follow through, she moved to Silicon Valley.

== Career ==
Cheung worked at Slide.com as a group product manager, overlooking multiple projects such as FunWall, SuperPoke!, and SuperPoke! Pets. After departing from these projects, Cheung and her brother joined Y Combinator. Together, they brainstormed several startup ideas, including Pathjoy, a platform to connect customers with life coaches and therapists, but soon abandoned the idea. Instead, Cheung pivoted Pathjoy's business model towards finding house cleaners instead of therapists. The idea came when her brother was looking for a cleaning service, but all offerings were either from expensive cleaning agencies or untested cleaners from Craigslist. To further reinforce the company's new direction, the name Pathjoy was changed to Homejoy.

=== Homejoy ===
Inspired by other companies that participate in a sharing economy, Cheung created Homejoy with her brother in 2012. The company was located in San Francisco and she worked as the CEO. By 2013, the company raised $38 million from Google Ventures, Redpoint Ventures, and Max Levchin towards their venture funding. By 2013, Homejoy was available in 31 cities.

For research, Cheung worked at a professional cleaning company to learn the issues facing cleaners, including scheduling difficulties and inefficient traveling. She was the first cleaner for Homejoy and cleaned houses herself as the startup got off the ground. Because of her experience, the new Homejoy hires were required to do a test cleaning job as part of the hiring process. During their test cleaning the new hires were taught how to clean in an efficient manner, and how to communicate with the homeowners in a friendly and effective way.

Cheung herself also went out on cleaning assignments at least once a month. She had plans for Homejoy to move into home repairs, including electricity and plumbing.

Homejoy shut down in 2015 due to poor customer retention rates, high customer acquisition costs, and several lawsuits from workers claiming to being "misclassified as independent contractors". An estimated 20 of Homejoy's employees were hired by Google in the wake of the closure.
