= Liz Fosslien =

American author

Liz Fosslien is an American author, illustrator, and expert in workplace culture and emotions. She is the co-author of the books No Hard Feelings: The Secret Power of Embracing Emotions at Work and Big Feelings: How to Be Okay When Things Are Not Okay, both of which explore the intersection of emotions and professional life.

== Early life and education ==
Liz Fosslien studied mathematical economics at Pomona College.

== Career ==
After college, she worked as an analyst at an economic consulting firm, a job that she initially believed would be her dream career. However, the experience led to severe anxiety and burnout, ultimately prompting her to leave the role. This experience significantly influenced her later work on emotions in the workplace.

Fosslien began her career in the tech industry, where she served as the chief of staff at Parliament, and at Genius, focusing on rebranding and diversity inclusion efforts. However, her passion for illustrating and exploring the emotional dynamics of the workplace led her to co-author two books with Mollie West Duffy.

In 2019, Fosslien co-authored No Hard Feelings: The Secret Power of Embracing Emotions at Work with Mollie West Duffy. The book challenges the traditional notion that emotions should be kept out of the workplace and argues that acknowledging and managing emotions can lead to more effective and meaningful work experiences. The book resonated with millennial professionals, who often struggle with the rigid separation between "work life" and "personal life."

In 2022, Fosslien and Duffy released their second book, Big Feelings: How to Be Okay When Things Are Not Okay. This work dives into seven challenging emotions—uncertainty, comparison, anger, burnout, perfectionism, despair, and regret—offering personal insights and strategies for coping with them. The book was inspired by their own experiences with burnout, chronic pain, and the loss of loved ones, and it emphasizes the importance of sharing and acknowledging difficult emotions.

== Illustrations and public influence ==
Fosslien is also known for her illustrations that depict various aspects of emotional life, both at work and beyond. These illustrations have gained traction on platforms like LinkedIn, where they are often shared and discussed by professionals seeking to better understand and manage their emotions. Her work has been praised for making complex emotional concepts accessible and relatable through simple yet powerful visuals.

== Personal life ==
Liz Fosslien resides in the San Francisco Bay Area, where she balances her professional life with personal projects, including her work as an illustrator. She is an advocate for bringing one's full self to work and believes in the power of vulnerability and emotional expression in the workplace.

== Bibliography ==
- No Hard Feelings: The Secret Power of Embracing Emotions at Work (2019)
- Big Feelings: How to Be Okay When Things Are Not Okay (2022)
