= Copyfish =

Web browser extension to copy text from non-text

Copyfish is a browser extension software for Google Chrome and Firefox that allows users to copy and paste or copy and translate text from within images. "Images" come in all kinds of forms: photographs, charts, diagrams, screenshots, PDF documents, comics, error messages, memes, Flash, and subtitles in YouTube movies.

After a user marks the text in an image, Copyfish sends the image to a server API that extracts it from a website, video or PDF document.

Copyfish was first published in October 2015. Copyfish is not only used in Western countries but despite being available only with an English user interface, is used by many Chinese and Hindi-speaking Chrome users. The software is published under the GPL open-source license and hosted on GitHub.
