= Adora Cruises =

Chinese-British-American cruise line

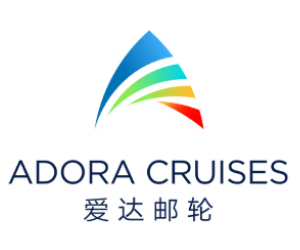
- Type: Wholly owned subsidiary
- Industry: travel, tourism
- Founded: 2015
- Founder: Yang Guobing
- Headquarters: East Asia
- Key people: Chen Ranfeng (CEO)
- Products: Cruises
- Parent: Carnival Corporation & plc (2020-2023)
- Website: www.adoracruises.com

Adora Cruises Limited (formerly CSSC Carnival Cruise Shipping) is a Chinese-American cruise line that was scheduled to begin operation in 2020, but was delayed due to COVID-19 pandemic.

== History ==
CSSC Carnival was founded in October 2015 as a joint venture, worth about $4 billion over ten years, between United Kingdom and United States' Carnival Corporation & plc, Chinese sovereign wealth fund China Investment Corporation, and Chinese shipbuilder China State Shipbuilding Corporation (CSSC). CSSC Carnival is headquartered in Hong Kong and is majority owned by the Chinese shareholders, which collectively own 60% of the company, with Carnival holding the remainder. In September 2016, the company announced plans to order two new ships, with options for two more, with deliveries planned to begin in 2022.

In February 2017, two more options were added to the order, and it was announced that the vessels would be built at Shanghai Waigaoqiao Shipbuilding Company through a joint venture between CSSC, owner of the shipyard, and Italian shipbuilder Fincantieri, with the first ship to be delivered in 2023.

In November 2018, the contract for the first two Chinese-built ships was formally signed at a cost of about $1.5 billion, and CSSC Carnival announced that it planned to purchase two ships already in service, to enter its fleet beginning in late 2019.

In 2026, Adora Cruises announced a cooperation with Astro Ocean, which operates the MV Piano Land

== Fleet ==
Adora Cruises will begin operations with two ships purchased from Costa Cruises, Costa Atlantica in 2020 and Costa Mediterranea in 2021.

The first Chinese-built vessel, to be constructed off of the Vista-class design, is expected to be delivered in 2023, with the sister ship following in 2024. If all four options are exercised, a new ship will be delivered annually through 2028. As of October 2023, Mediterranea has entered service for the brand, which will be followed with Adora Magic City in January 2024. Costa Atlantica however was resold in October 2023 and will not enter service with the brand.

=== Current ships ===
Ship	Flag	Build Year	Entering the Fleet	Gross Tonnage	Home Port	Notes	Image
Adora Mediterranea	(The Bahamas)	2003	2021	85,619 GT	Tianjin, China, Guangzhou, China, Xiamen, China	Joined the fleet in 2021. Sails a range of itineraries from ports in China.	
Adora Magic City	(Panama)	2023	2023	136,201 GT	Shanghai, China	Based off the Vista class. Sails from Shanghai, its namesake.	
Adora Flora City	TBC	2026	2026	142,000 GT	Guangzhou, China	Delivery scheduled for 2026. Operations due to start late 2026, sailing from Guangzhou, a city north of Hong Kong.	

=== Future ships ===
Ship	Flag	Build Year	Entering the Fleet	Gross Tonnage	Home Port	Notes	Image
TBC	TBC	2030	2030				
TBC	TBC	TBC	TBC				

=== Former ships ===
Ship	Flag	Build Year	Entering the Fleet	Gross Tonnage	Home Port	Notes	Image
Costa Atlantica	(The Bahamas)	2000	2020	85,619 GT	Never Operated	Joined Carnival China (now Adora Cruises) in January 2020. It never entered service for Adora Cruises, and was later purchased and reconditioned by Margaritaville at Sea and remained in service.	
