= SuperPoke! =

Superpoke! and SuperPoke! Pets were virtual goods apps for Facebook and MySpace originally created by Nikil Gandhy, Will Liu, and Jonathan Hsu. They launched less than one month after the creation of the Facebook Platform. Max Levchin's Slide acquired the application and its creators in 2007, with the application growing to become one of Facebook's most popular applications in terms of monthly active users. The application mimicked Facebook's own "poke" feature, adding new actions like smiles, winks, slaps, and “smacking” Facebook friends. At one point SuperPoke! allowed users to virtually “stab” friends; Slide later removed this option following protests from anti-knife crime groups.

SuperPoke! differentiated itself from other applications by introducing characters such as a sheep, chicken, and penguin. SuperPoke! was shut down on September 27, 2011 and SuperPoke! Pets closed on March 7, 2012.

== Shutdown of SuperPoke! Pets and subsequent lawsuit for loss of purchased virtual goods ==
In August 2010, Slide was acquired by Google, and almost a year later SuperPoke! Pets announced significant changes including removal of gold buying and quests.

In September 2011, it was announced that SuperPoke! Pets would be shut down permanently beginning March 6, 2012.

In 2012, the SuperPoke! Pets user community sued Google/Slide for shutting down SuperPoke! Pets after its players had invested an estimated $650 million of money in virtual goods that, with the shutdown of the app, would now expire worthless. The plaintiff's legal team wrote that Google's offer of a limited, "SuperPoke! Pets Lite" that eliminated access to virtual goods and interaction with pets was inadequate because it “entirely stripped the value from customers' original purchases,” rendering their virtual items as “effectively valueless” as users could no longer interact with each other on the secondary market or play with their virtual pets. Characterizing the virtual items they had purchased as “property,” they claimed that as a result of Slide/Google's actions, individual players lost access to an inventory of goods that had cost “hundreds or even thousands of dollars.” In 2013, the case was voluntarily dismissed by Abreu.
