= Caffè Florian =

Oldest coffee house in the world, located in Italy

Coordinates: 45°26′1″N 12°20′17″E

- Type: Private
- Founded: 1720; 306 years ago
- Headquarters: Piazza San Marco, Venice
- Website: www.caffeflorian.com

Caffè Florian is a coffee house situated in the Procuratie Nuove of Piazza San Marco, Venice. It was established in 1720 and is the oldest coffee house in continuous operation in Italy, and one of the oldest in the world (the oldest being Queen's Lane Coffee House in Oxford, founded in 1654).

== History ==
The Florian opened with two simply furnished rooms on 29 December 1720 as "Alla Venezia Trionfante" (Venice the Triumphant), but soon became known as Caffè Florian, after its original owner Floriano Francesconi. The Caffè was patronised in its early days by notable people including the playwright Carlo Goldoni, Goethe and Casanova, who was no doubt attracted by the fact that Caffè Florian was the only coffee house that allowed women. Later Lord Byron, Marcel Proust, and Charles Dickens were frequent visitors. It was one of the few places where Gasparo Gozzi's early newspaper Gazzetta Veneta could be bought in the mid-18th century, and became a meeting place for people from different social classes. In 1750 the Florian expanded to four rooms.

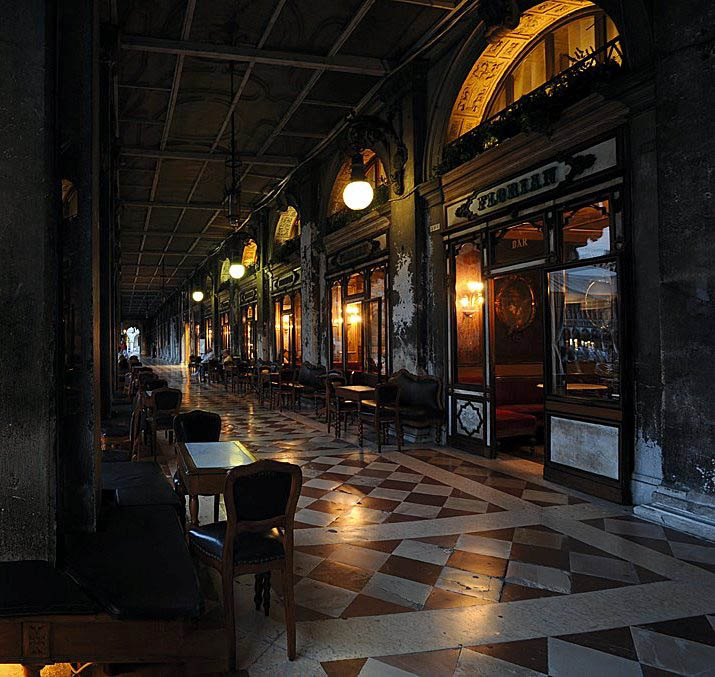
Entrance of the Caffè Florian under the Procuratie Nuove

In 1773, Valentino Francesconi, the grandson of Floriano Francesconi, took over the business at the beginning of the 18th century. In 1796, in a European atmosphere characterized by the French Revolution, the Venetian state feared that the revolutionary ideas could spread also in Venice. The Florian, with its international clientele, had become a meeting place for many French Jacobins, so the State Inquisitors obliged Valentino Francesconi to close the café. When the French armies entered in Venice, in May 1797, Valentino Francesconi put down the double-obsolete "Venice Triumphant" sign outside the café and replaced it with one simply bearing the name of his uncle "Florian".

In 1814, Valentino Francesconi passed the café on to his son Antonio Francesconi (1799-1879).

By 1858, the establishment had passed into the hands of Vincenzo Porta, Giovanni Pardelli, and Pietro Baccanello, and was in need of some restoration.

Lodovico Cadorin was commissioned to carry out restoration work and redecorate the interiors.

The new rooms were named "Sala del Senato" (Senate Room), "Sala Greca" (Greek Room), "Sala Cinese" (Chinese room) and "Sala Orientale" (Oriental Room).

In the 19th century, the Florian played a role in the Italian Risorgimento because the "Senate Hall" was the meeting point for a group of Venetian patriots. This group had a key role in the Venetian Revolution of 1848, which would see Venice temporarily independent from Austria. During the convulsed hours of the Revolution, the Florian hosted the wounded patriots, becoming a temporary hospital.

Other restorations occurred at the Florian in 1872 and 1891 when two other rooms were added to the café: la "Sala degli Uomini Illustri" (the Hall of the Illustrious Men) and the "Sala delle Stagioni" (the Hall of the Seasons). In 1920 another room was added: the Liberty Room.

== Art ==
In 1858, the café was completely restored by Lodovico Cadorin because the rooms were not really restored since the 18th century. Cadorin created a great project of redecoration, calling the best artists and artisans available in Venice.

The Sala del Senato (Senate Hall) was decorated by Giacomo Casa with the paintings “The Age of Enlightenment, or Progress” “Civilization educating the nations”, and eleven panels representing Arts ad Sciences. Casa inserted masonic symbols in the painting, allusion to Venice’s close connections with certain secret societies and illuminism.

The Sala Cinese (Chinese Hall) and Sala Orientale (Oriental Hall) take their inspiration from the Far East with paintings of lovers and scantily clad exotic women painted by Antonio Pascuti.

In 1872 another two great halls were added to the café;

The Sala degli Uomini Illustri (Hall of the Illustrious Men) was decorated by Giulio Carlini with paintings of ten notable Venetians: Goldoni, Marco Polo, Titian, Francesco Morosini, Pietro Orseolo, Andrea Palladio, Benedetto Marcello, Paolo Sarpi, Vettor Pisani and Enrico Dandolo.

The Sala delle Stagioni (Hall of the Seasons) or Sala degli Specchi (Hall of Mirrors) was decorated by Vincenzo Rota with the figures of women representing the four seasons.

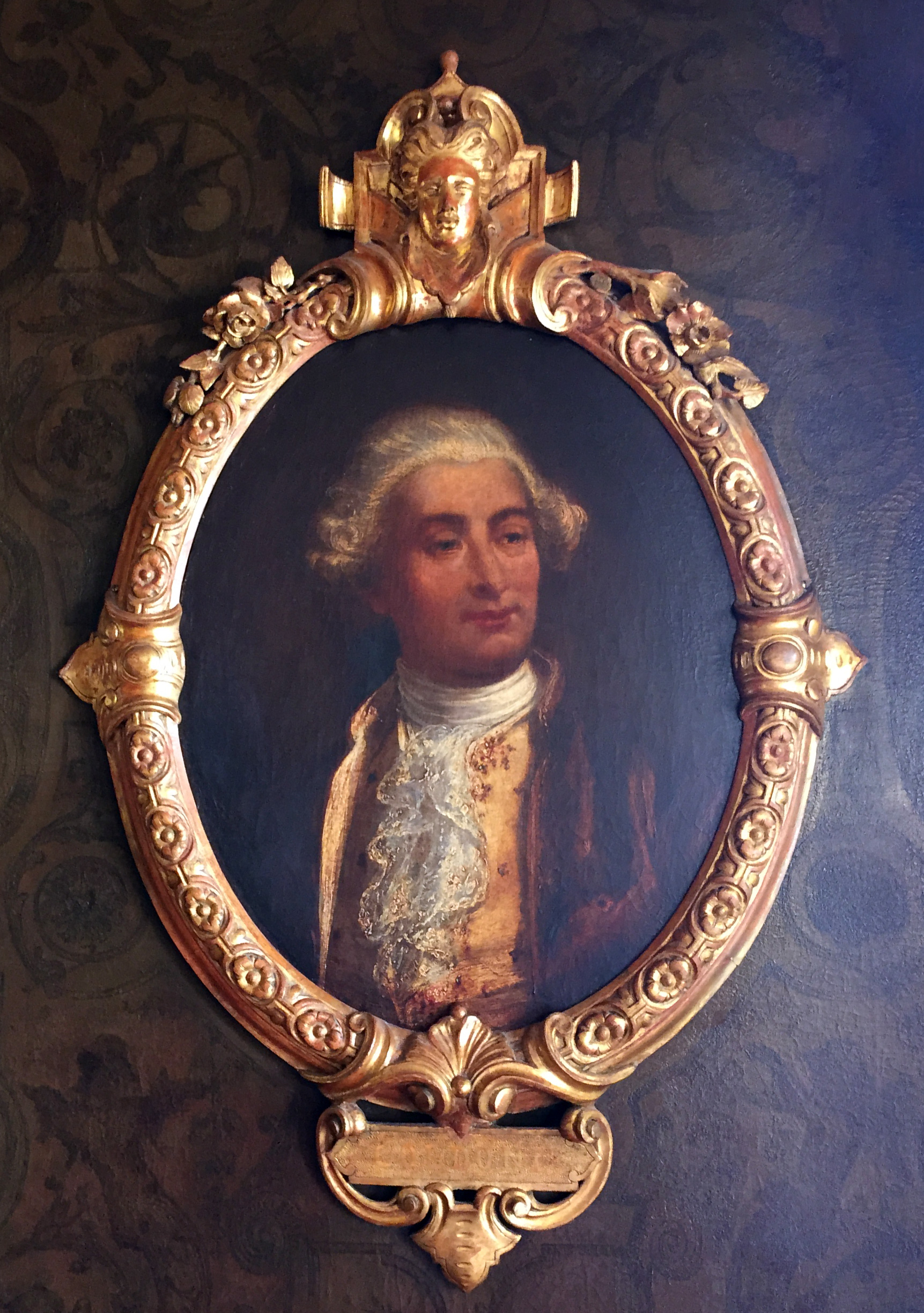

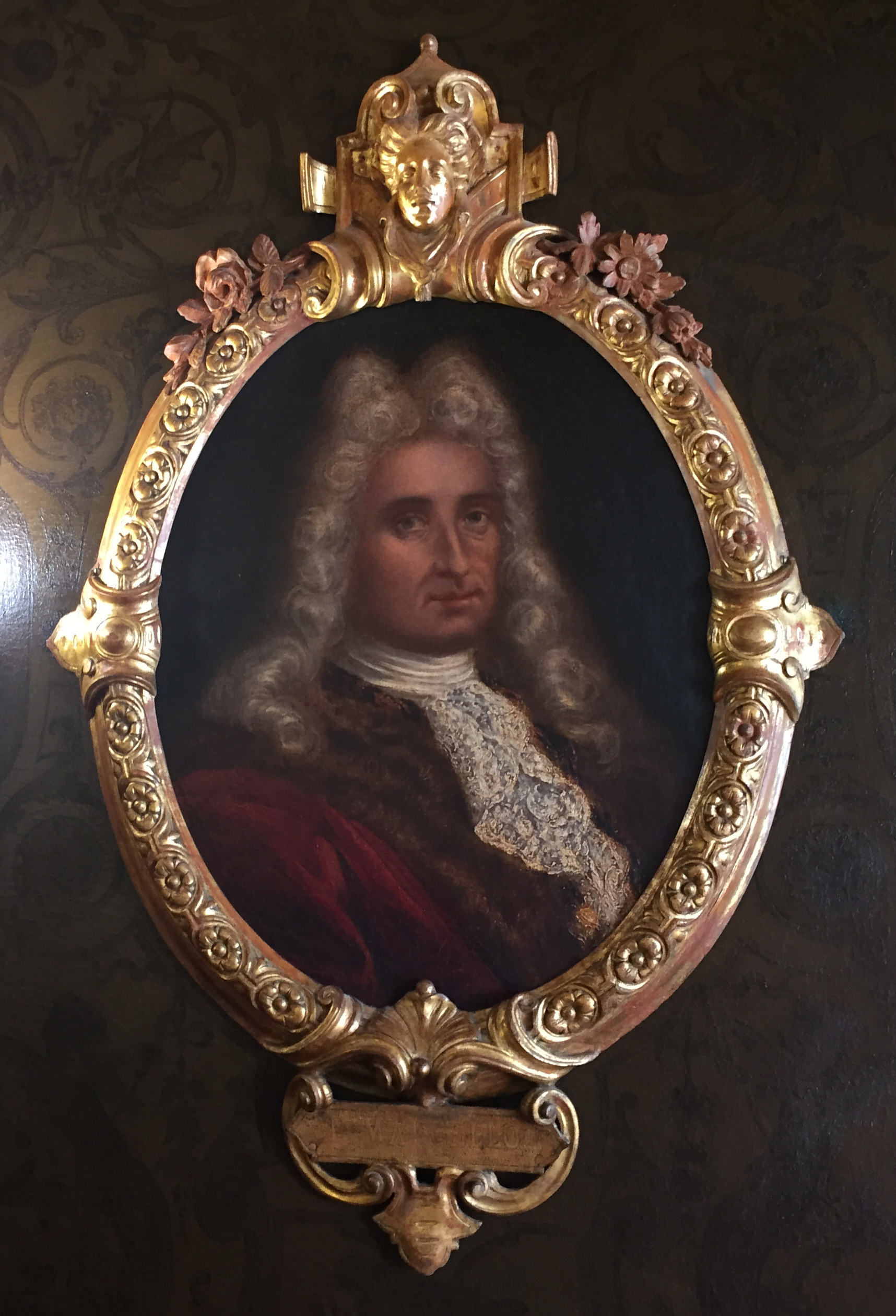

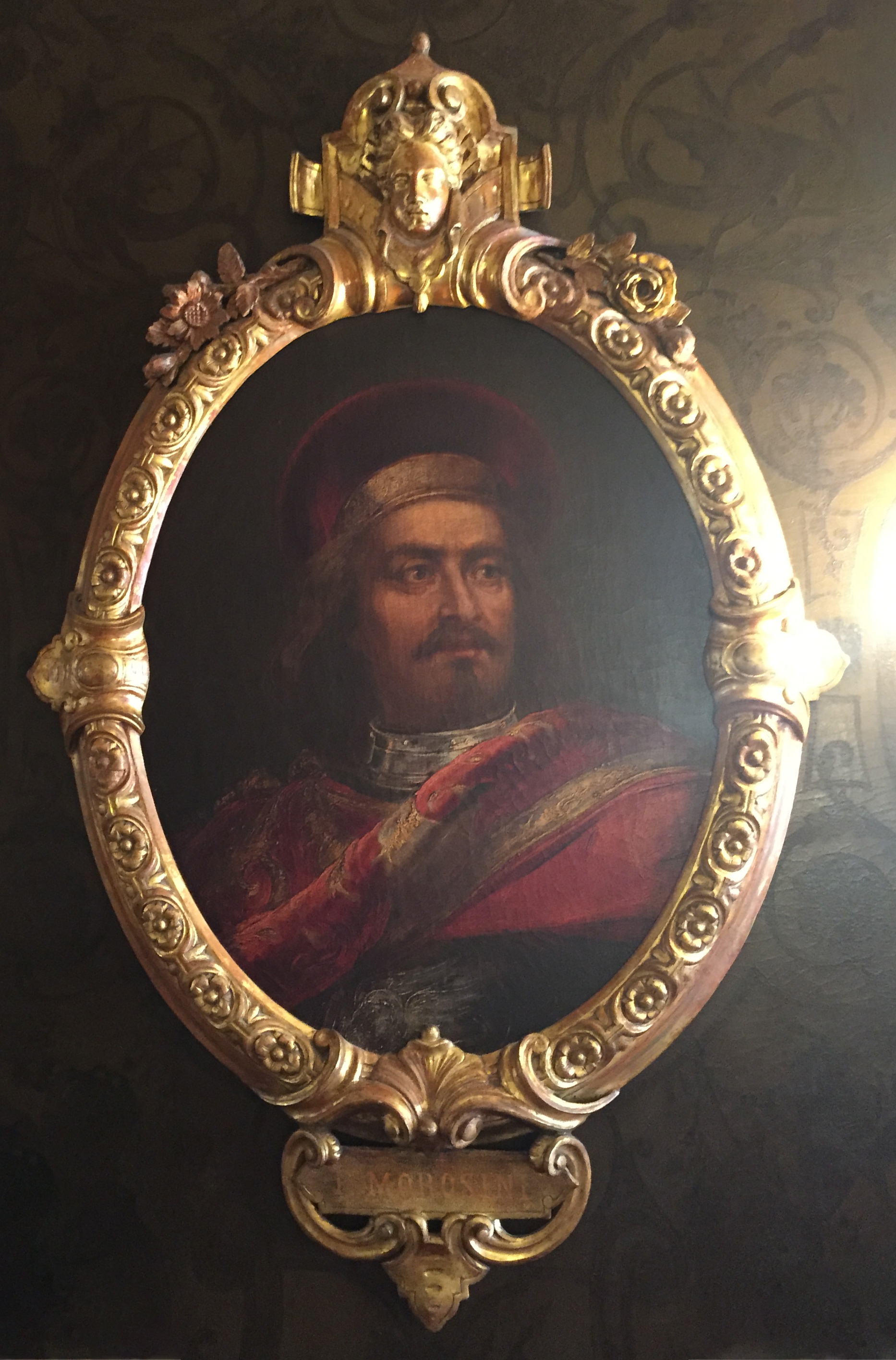

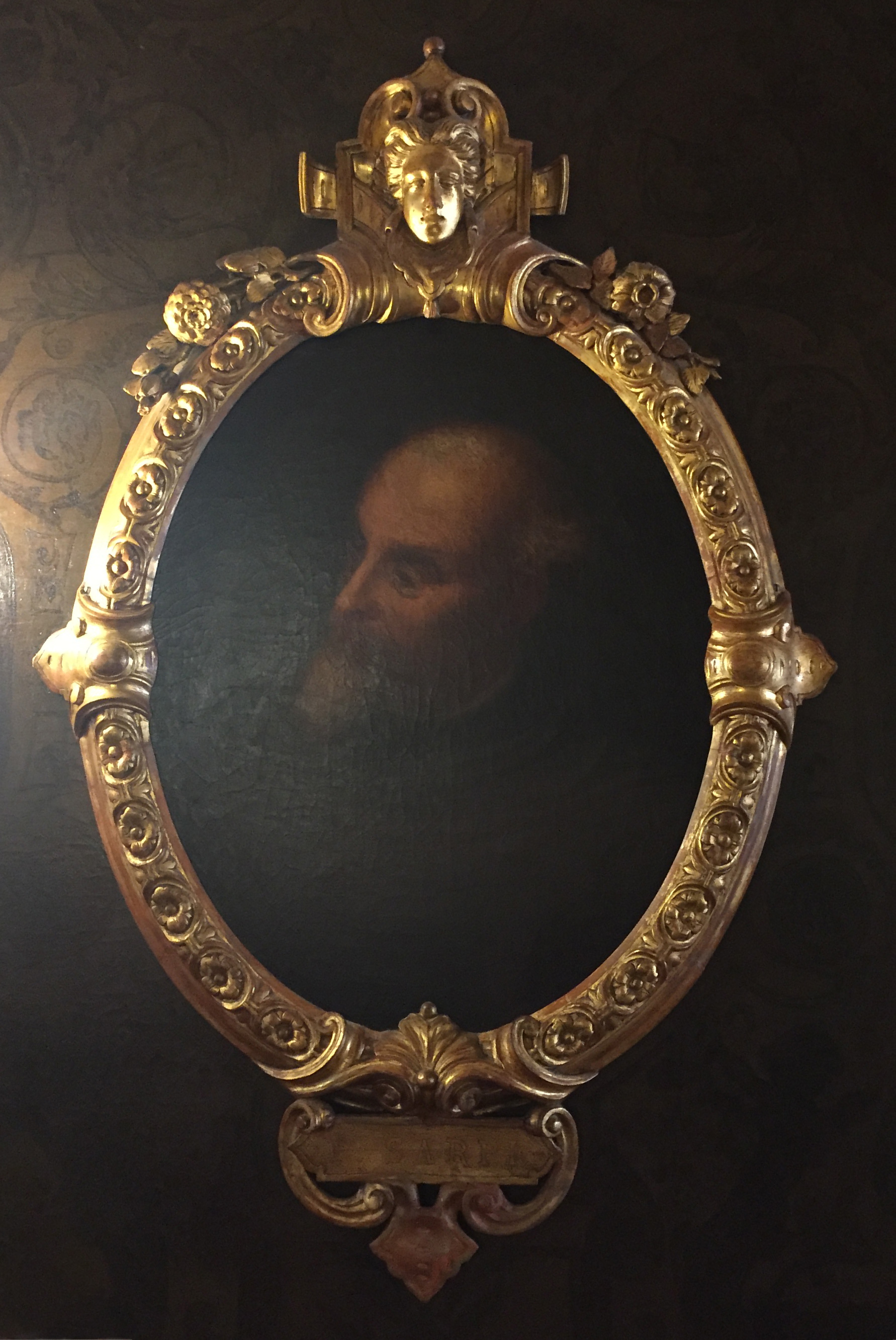

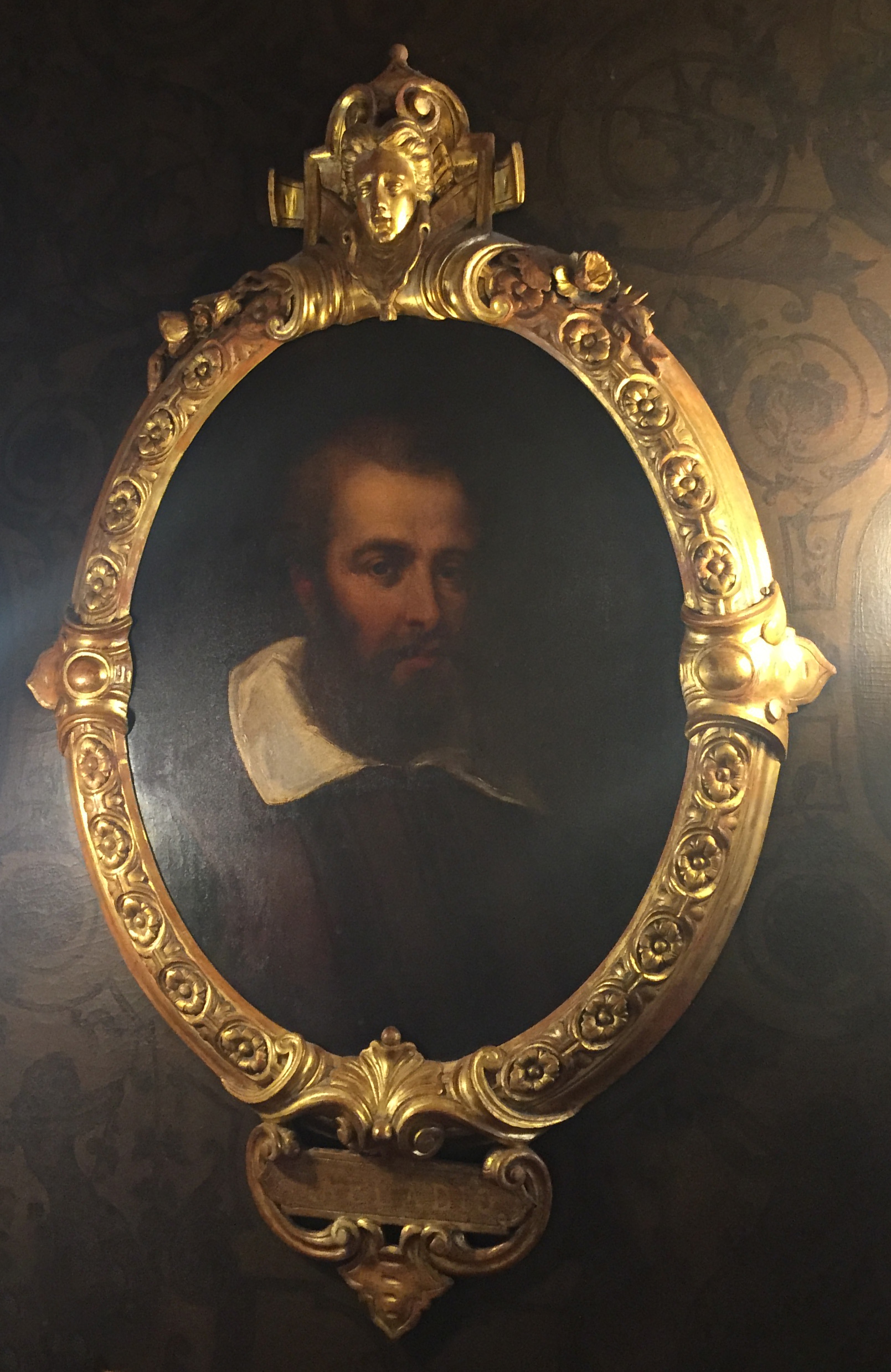

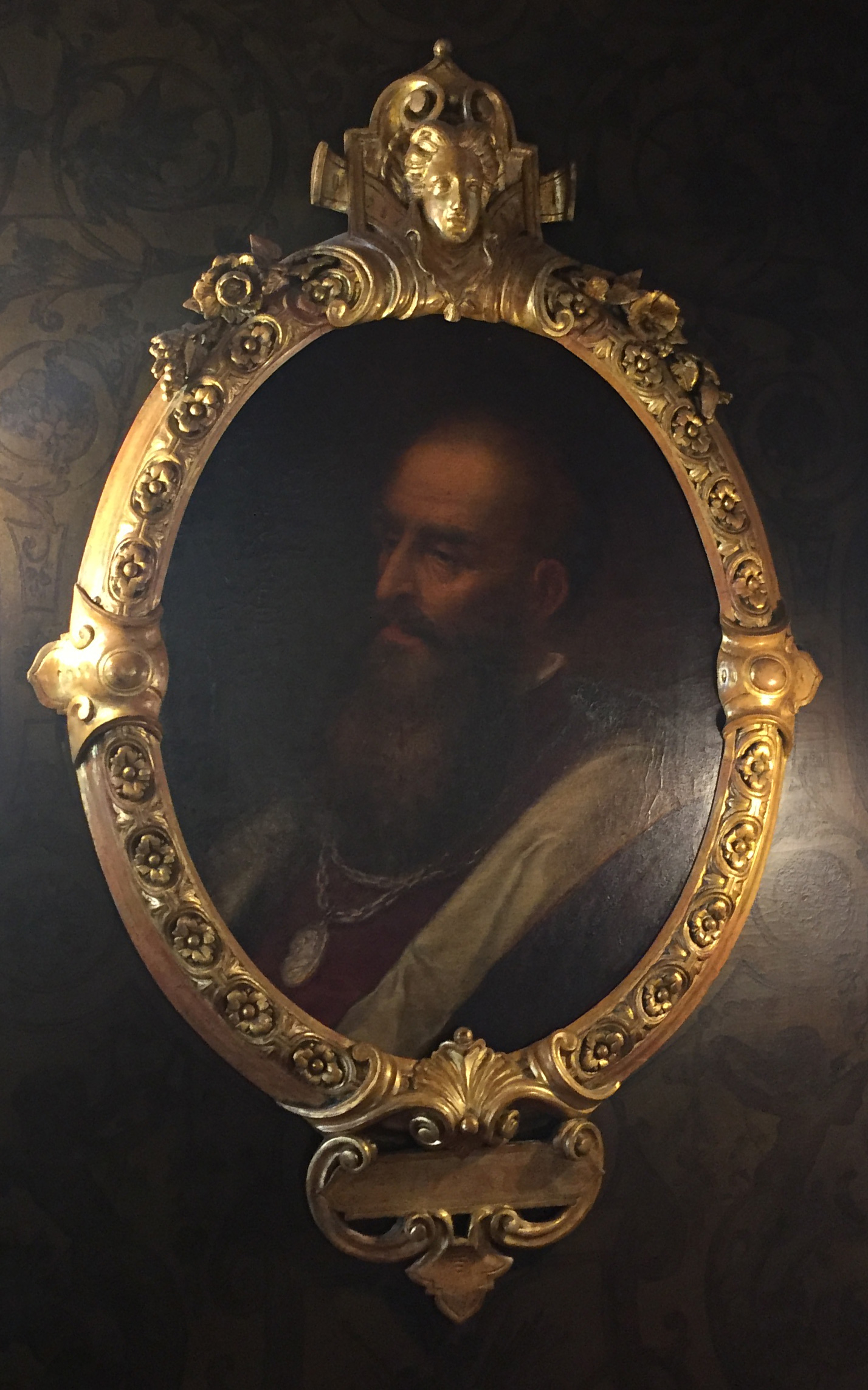

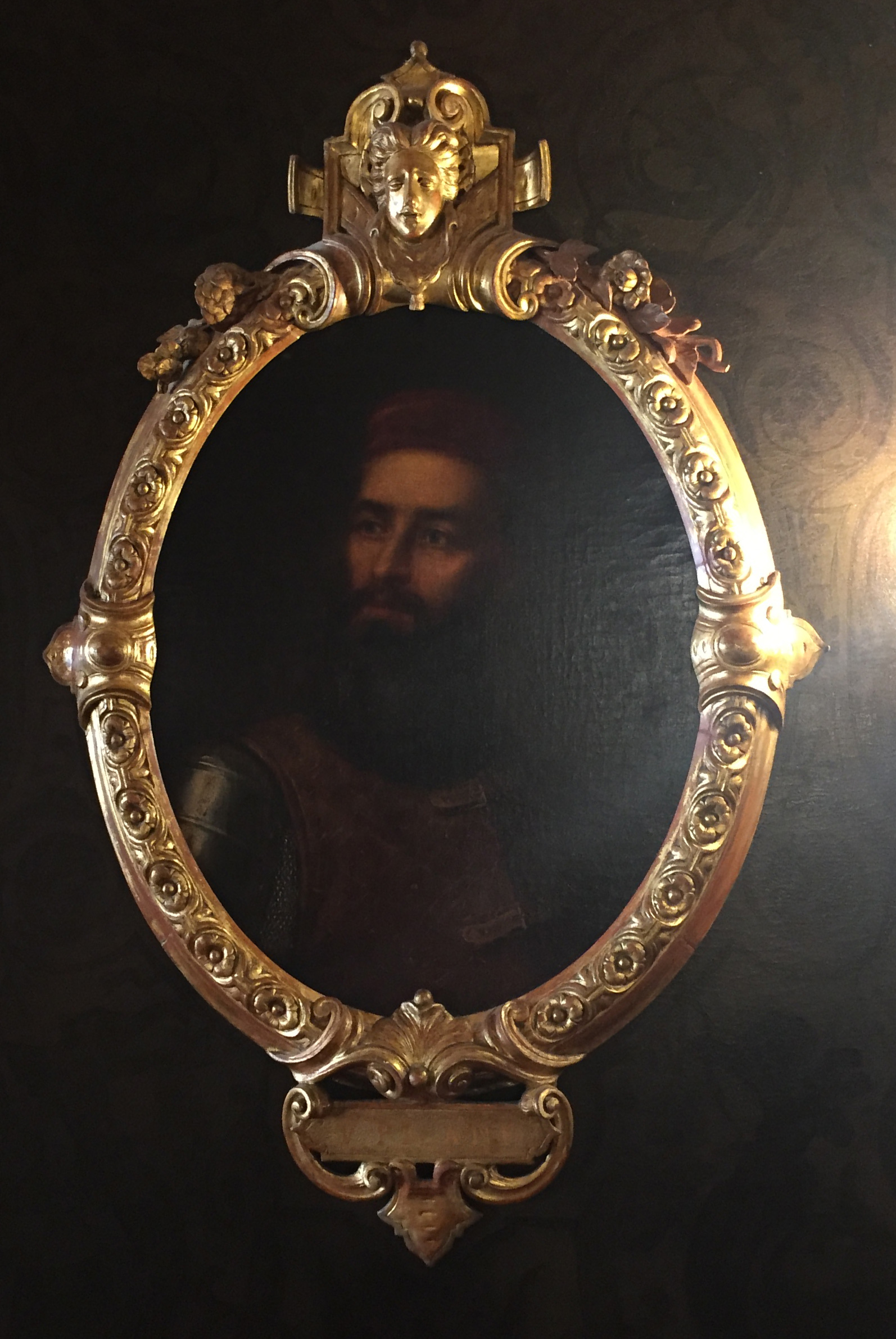

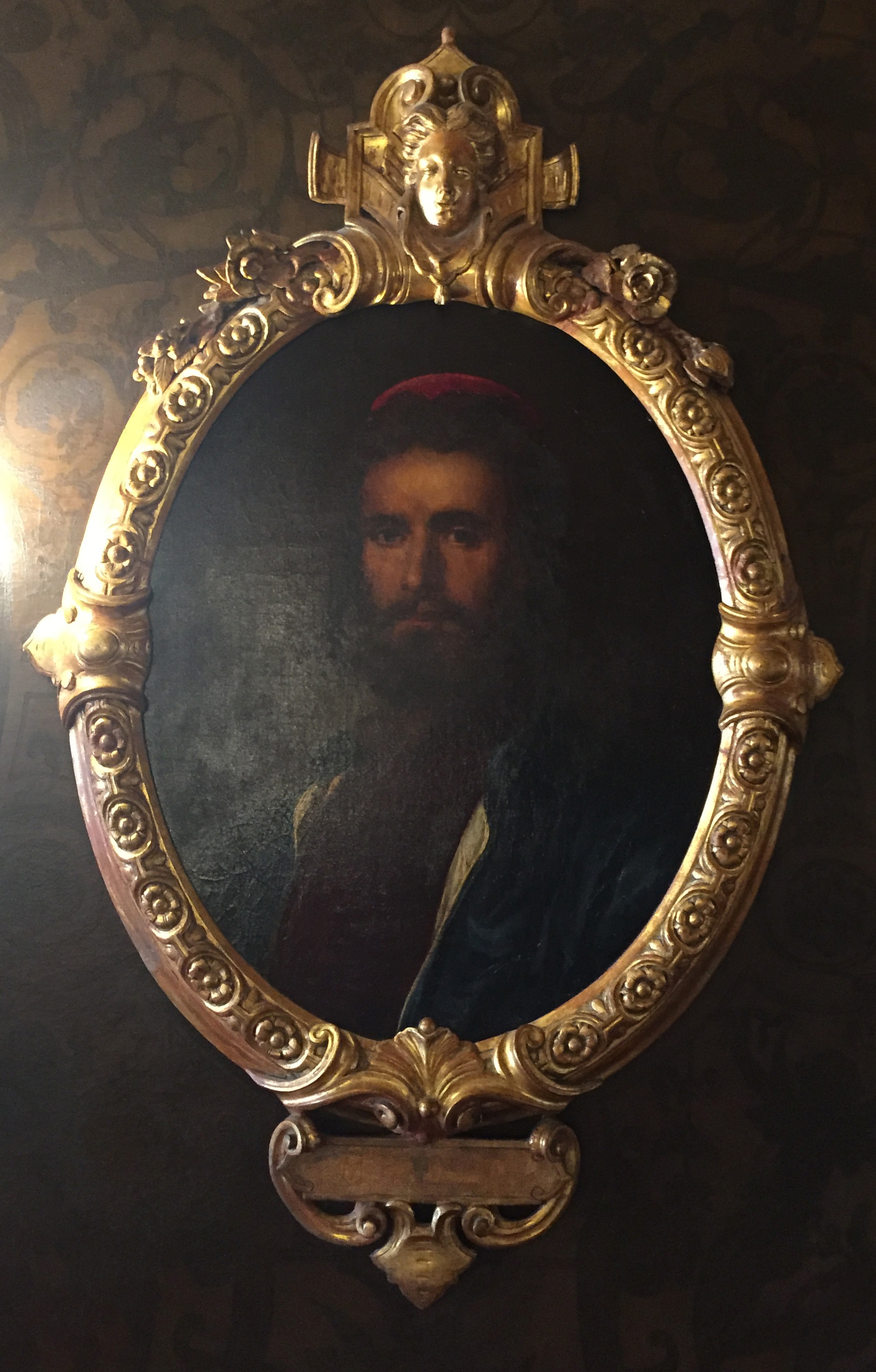

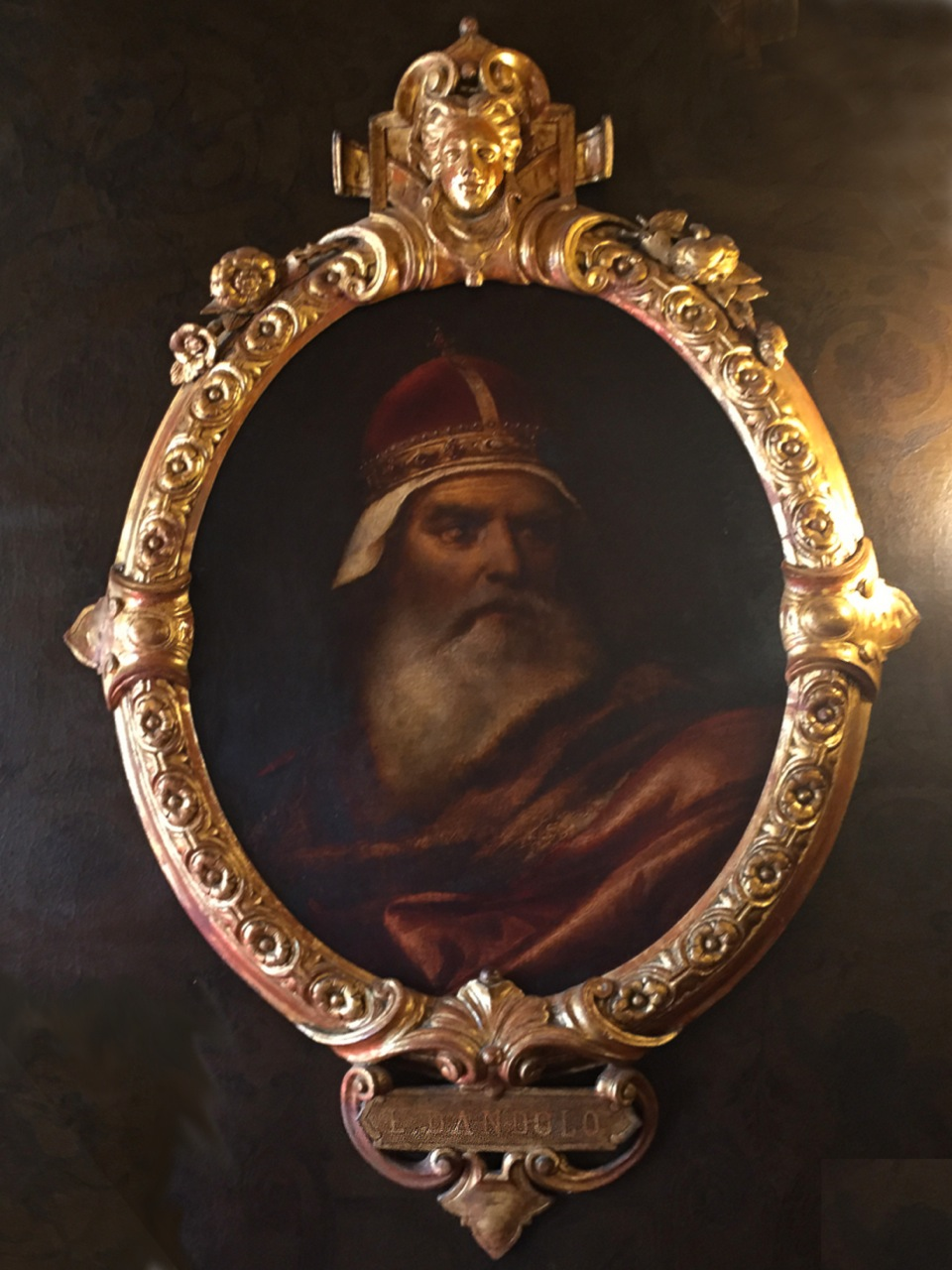

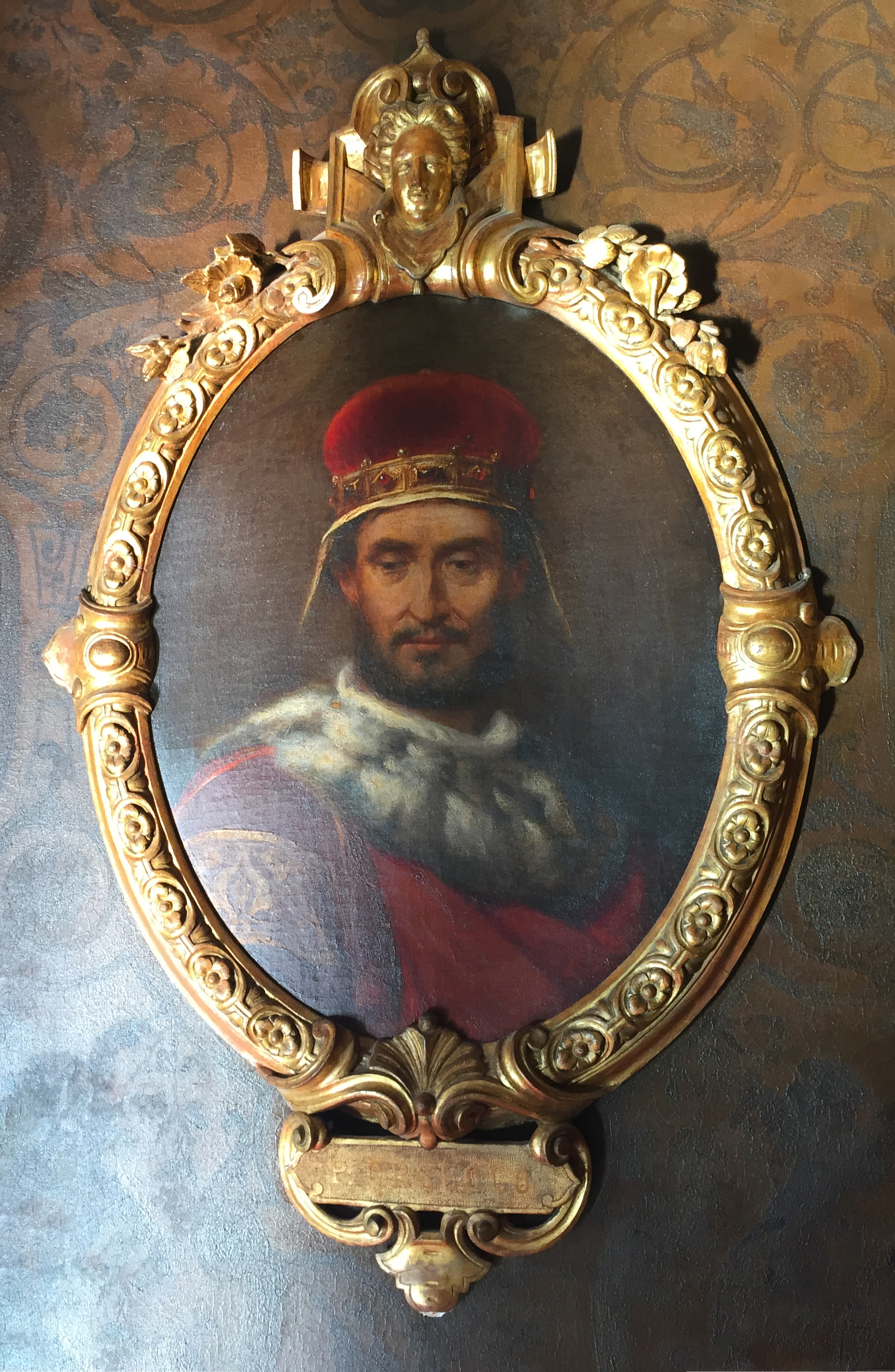

In 1920, during the anniversary of the café foundation, it was added another room: The Sala Liberty. It is decorated in an art nouveau style with hand-painted mirrors and sumptuous wooden wainscoting.

From 1893, at the prompting of Ricardo Selvatico who had been inspired while dining in the Senate Hall, the Florian became home to the Esposizione Internazionale d'Arte Contemporanea (International Exhibition of Contemporary Art), an ever-changing display of work from the artists of the time, known today as the Venice Biennale.

Since 1988, the Florian has hosted a contemporary art exhibition that takes place every two years in conjunction with the Biennale. The "Temporanea, the art of possible at the Caffè Florian" invites artists to reinterpret the Florian’s halls with an installation. Among the artists who have exhibited there are Bruno Ceccobelli, Mimmo Rotella, Fabrizio Plessi, Gaetano Pesce, Luca Buvoli, Arcangelo, Irene Andessner, Fausto Gilberti, Botto&Bruno, Marco Tirelli, Pietro Ruffo, Omar Galliani and Qiu Zhijie.

== Images ==
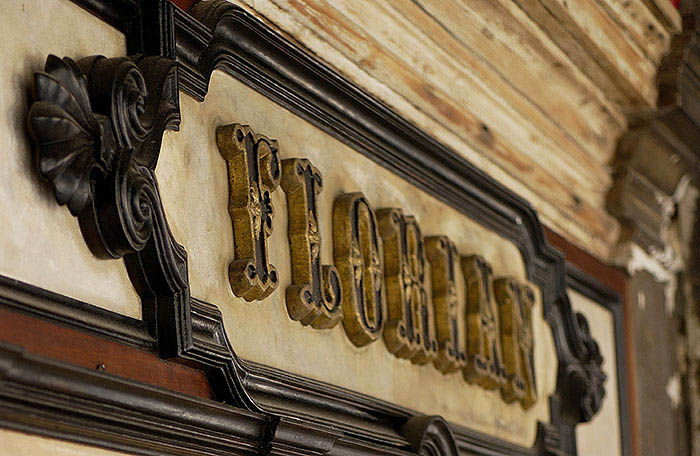
Caffè Florian Label

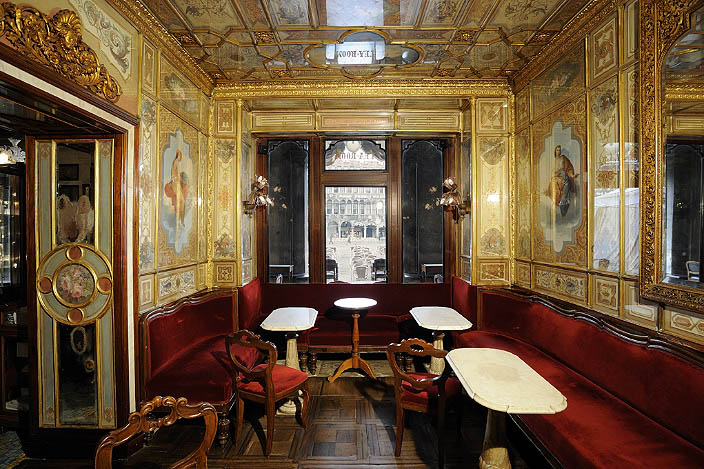
Sala del Senato (Senate Hall)

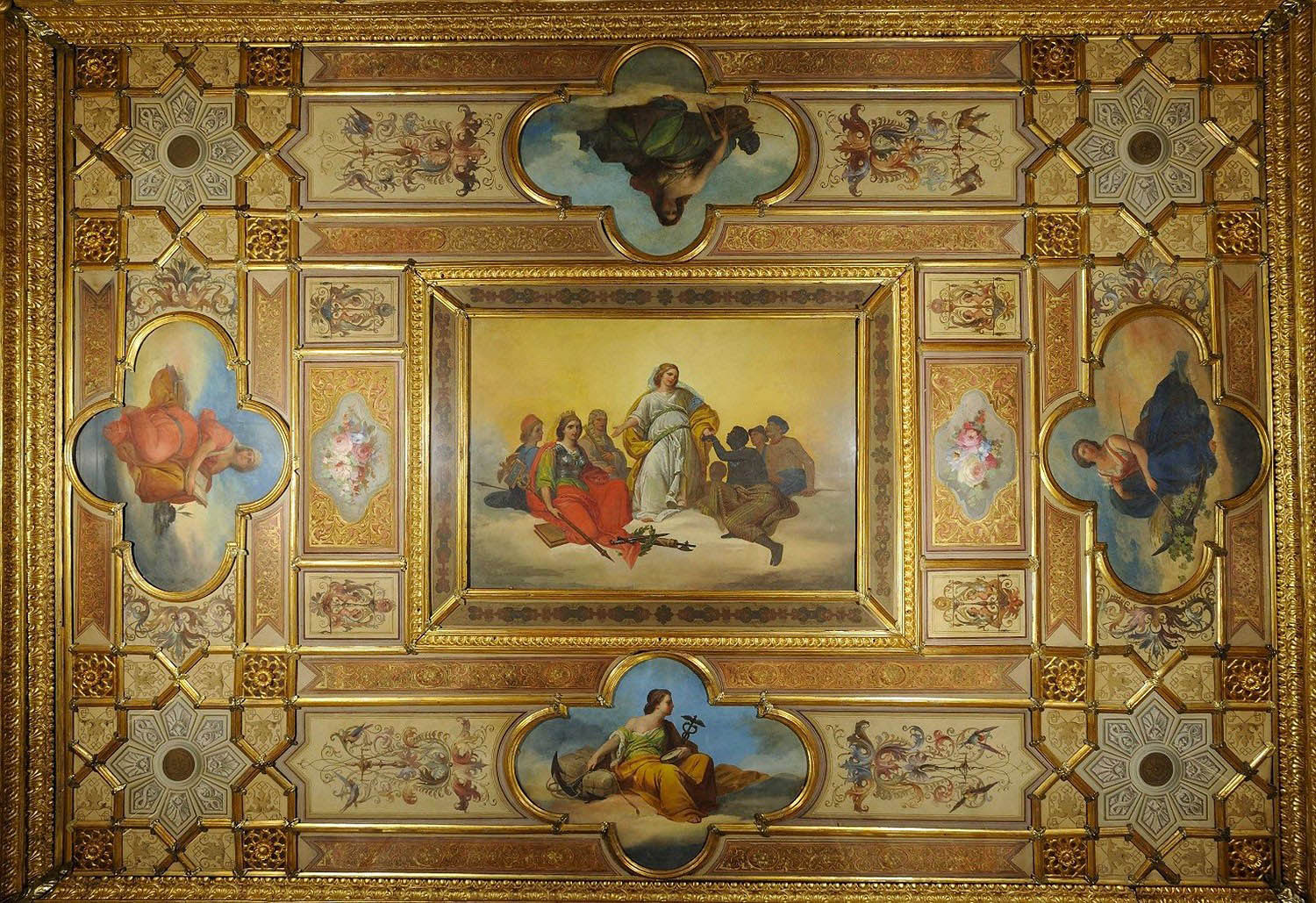
"Civilization educating the nations" by Giacomo Casa, ceiling of the Sala del Senato

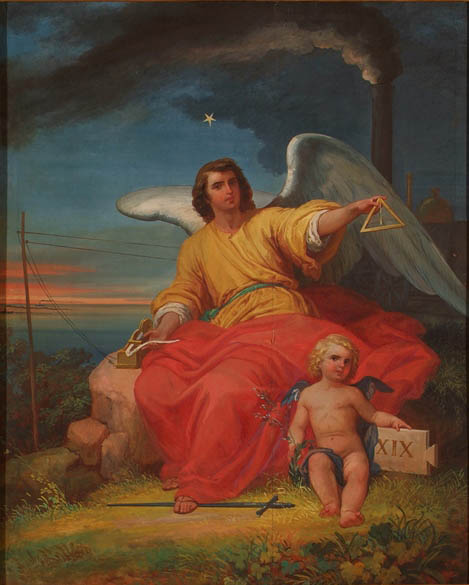
"Il The Age of Enlightenment, or The Progress" by Giacomo Casa, in the Sala del Senato

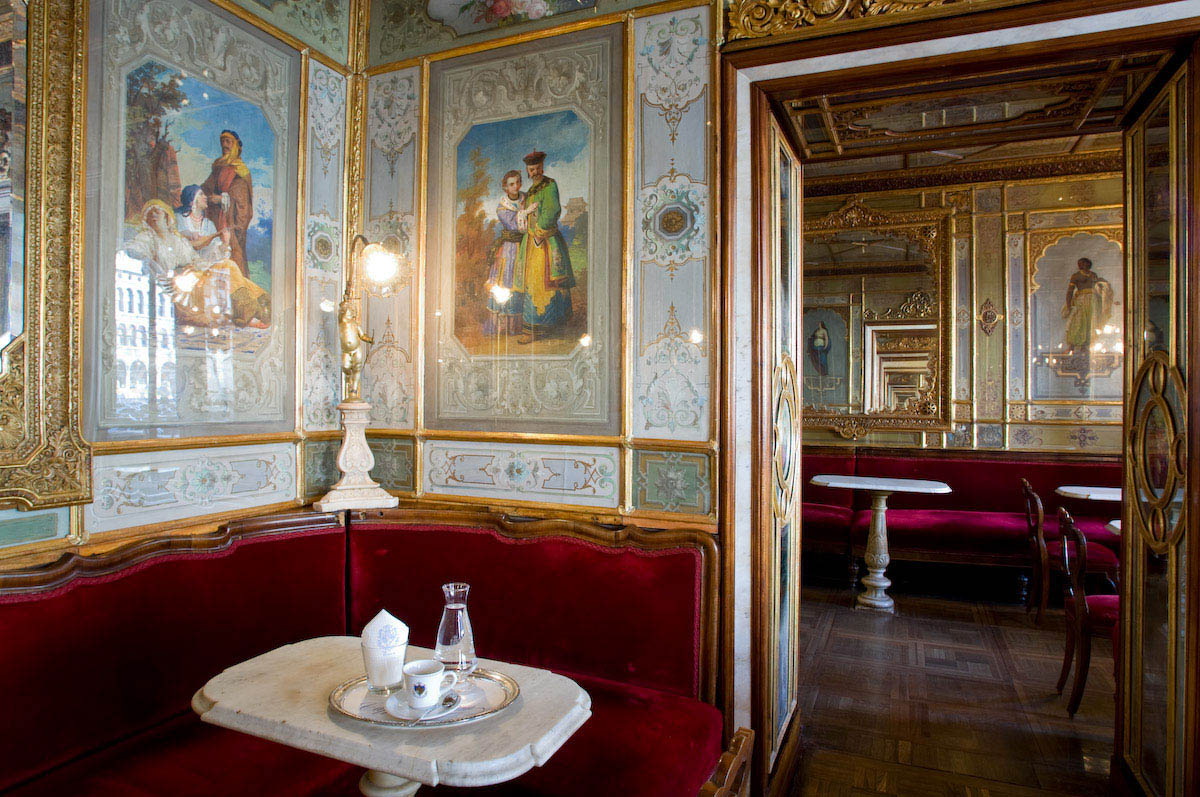
Sala Cinese (Chinese Hall)

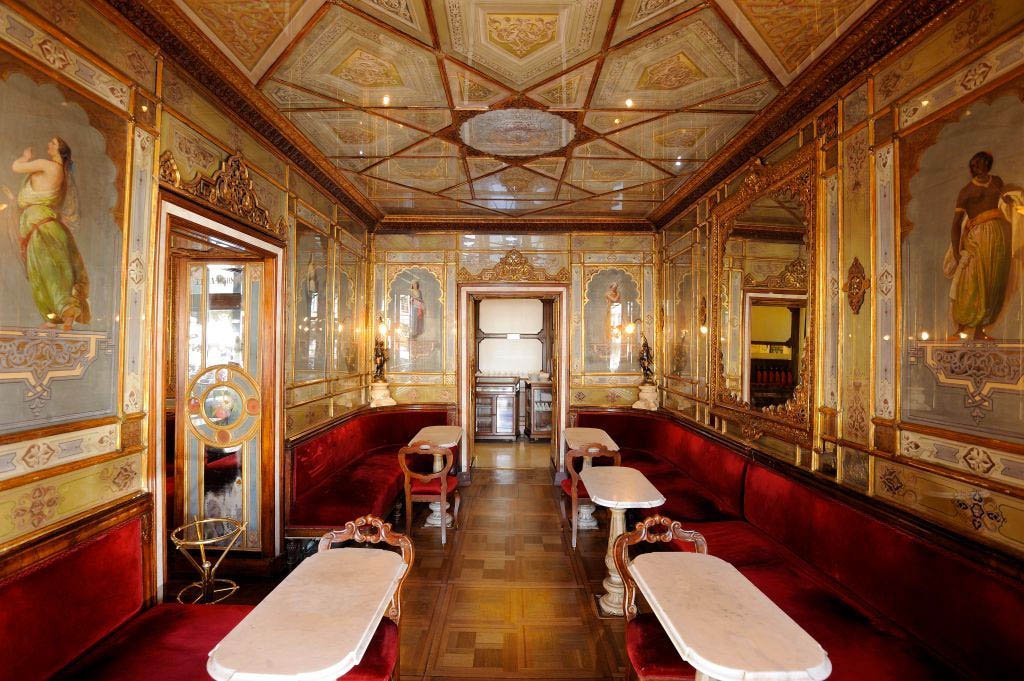
Sala Orientale (Oriental Hall)

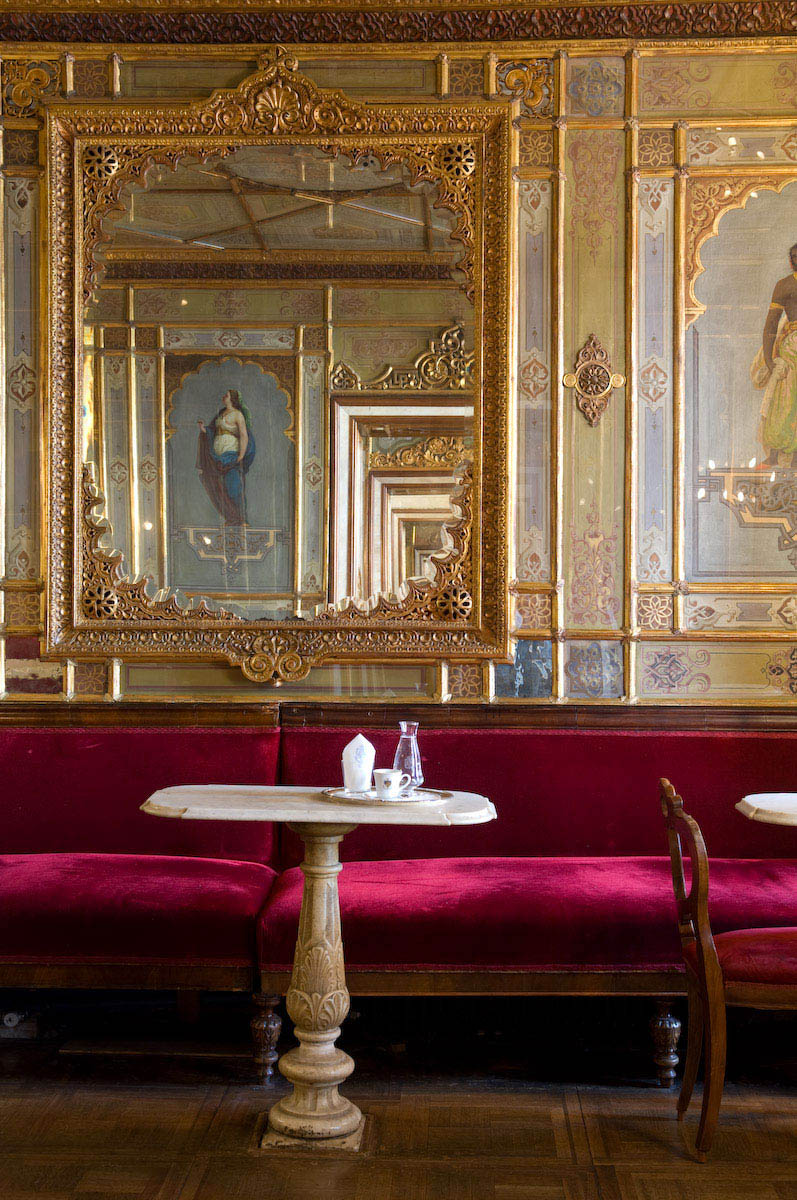
Sala Orientale (Oriental Hall)

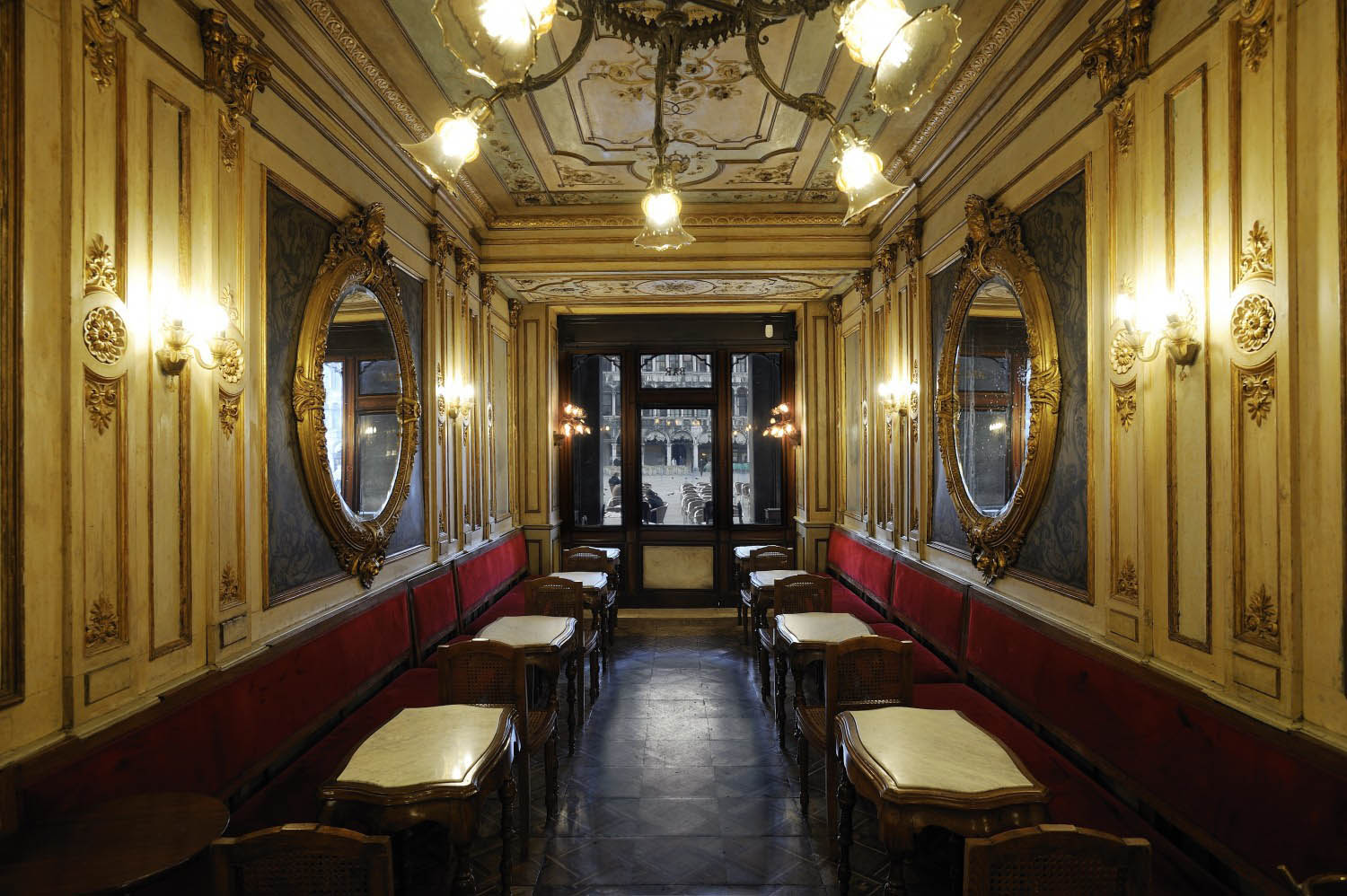
Sala delle Stagioni (Hall of the Seasons)

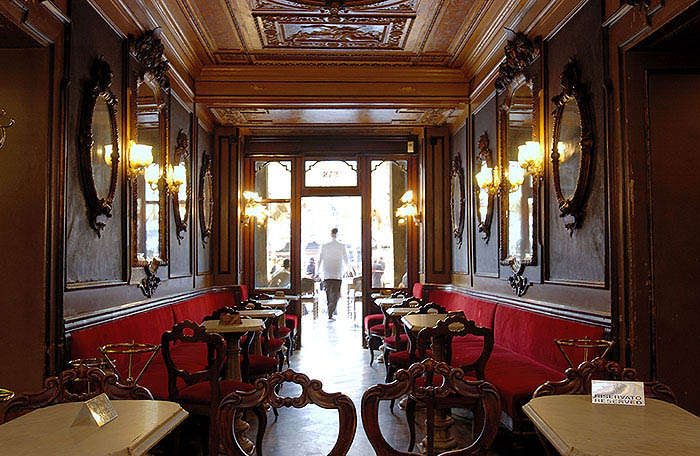
Sala degli Uomini Illustri (Hall of the Illustrious Men)

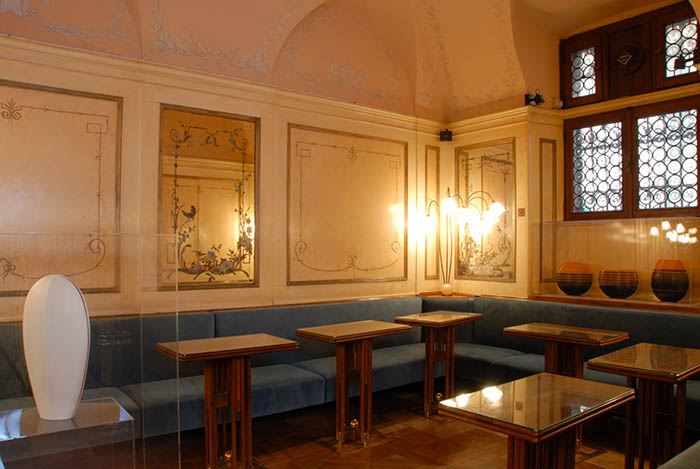
Sala Liberty

== Branching out ==
In the early twenty-first century, Florian experimented with branching out of Venice and opened a location on Via del Parione in the centre of Florence.
