= Giannutri Lighthouse =

Giannutri Punta Rossa
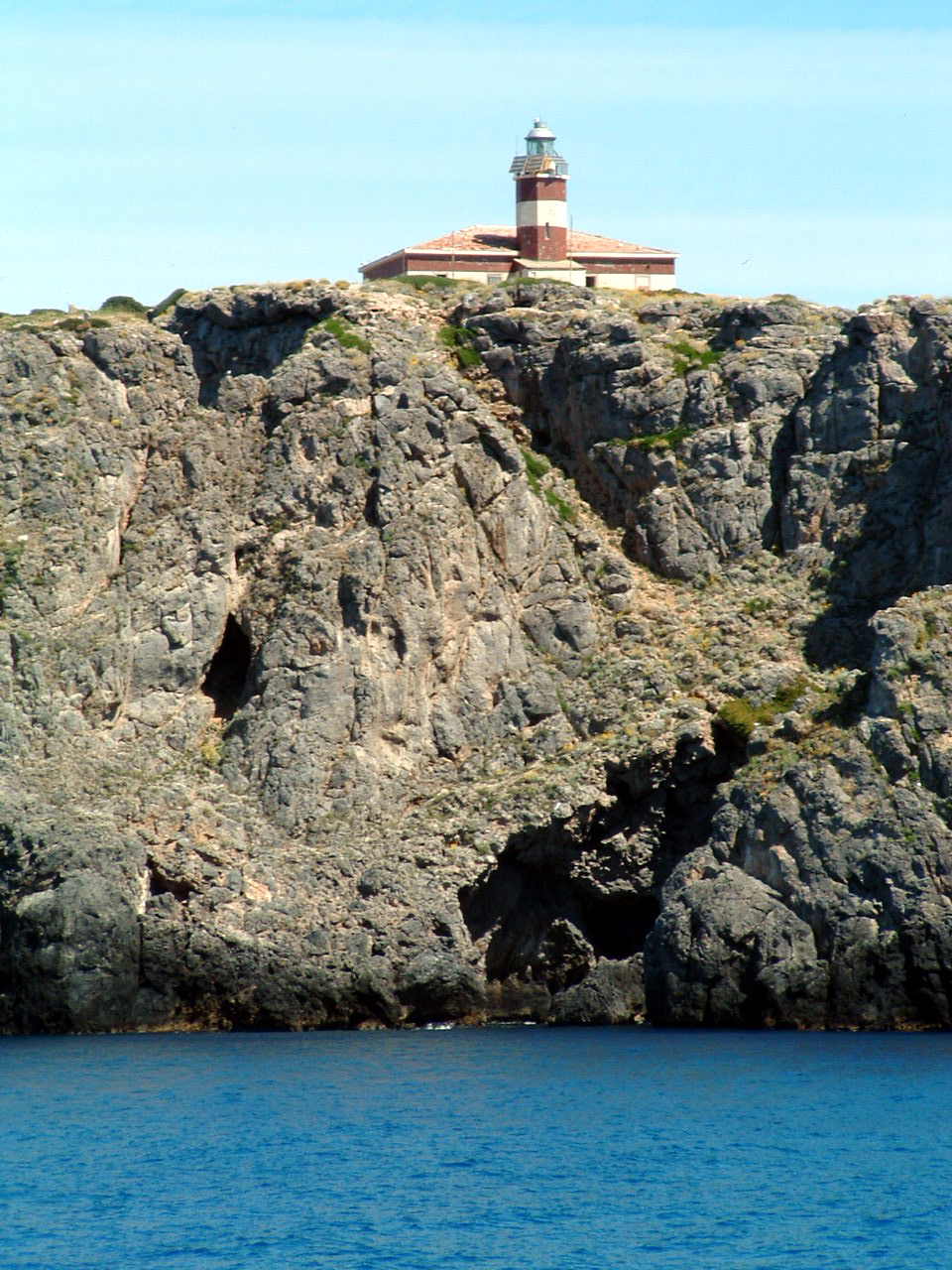
- Giannutri Lighthouse
- Location: Giannutri; Tuscany; Italy
- Coordinates: 42°14′22″N 11°06′29″E

Tower
- Constructed: 1882
- Foundation: concrete base
- Construction: masonry tower
- Automated: yes
- Height: 9 metres (30 ft)
- Shape: cylindrical tower with balcony and lantern attached to the front side of one-storey keeper's house
- Markings: tower and building painted in red and white stripes, grey metallic lantern dome
- Power source: solar power
- Operator: Marina Militare
- Fog signal: no

Light
- Focal height: 61 metres (200 ft)
- Lens: Type OF
- Intensity: LABI 100 w
- Range: main: 13 nautical miles (24 km; 15 mi)
- Characteristic: Fl W 5s.
- Italy no.: 2184 E.F

Giannutri Lighthouse (Italian: Faro di Giannutri) is an active lighthouse, located at Punta Rossa, the southernmost part of the island and of the Tuscan Archipelago on the Tyrrhenian Sea.

== Description ==
The lighthouse, built in 1882, consists of a masonry cylindrical tower, 9 metres (30 ft) high attached to the front side of a one-storey keeper's house, painted with red and white horizontal bands.

The light is positioned at 61 metres (200 ft) above sea level and emits one white flash in a 5 seconds period, visible up to a distance of 13 nautical miles (24 km; 15 mi). The lighthouse is completely automated, powered by a solar unit, and managed by the Marina Militare with the identification code number 2184 E.F.

== See also ==
- List of lighthouses in Italy
