= Maregiglio =

Italian shipping company

Maregiglio S.r.l.
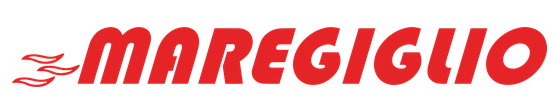
- Industry: Passenger transportation
- Founded: 1969
- Headquarters: Isola del Giglio, Tuscany, Italy
- Area served: Tyrrhenian Sea
- Website: www.maregiglio.it

Maregiglio is an Italian shipping company which operates in routes from Porto Santo Stefano to Isola del Giglio and Giannutri, in Tuscany. It was founded by Giuseppe Rum in 1969 to establish a transport service to and from the island of Giglio.

== Fleet ==
Ferry Libero Schiaffino in Porto Santo Stefano.

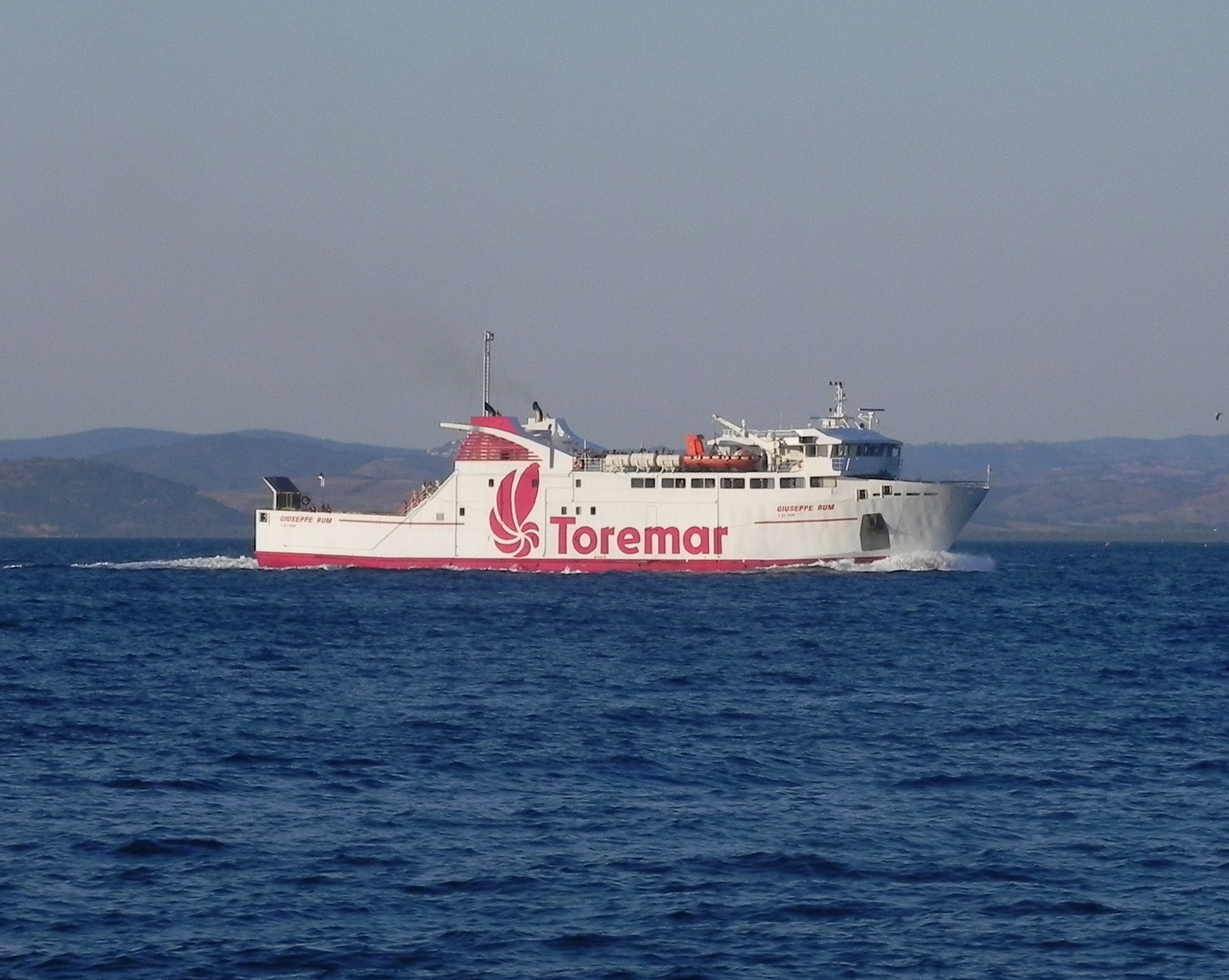
Ferry Giuseppe Rum owned Maregiglio, hired to Toremar.

Name	Tonnage	Passengers	Car capacity / l.m.	Speed Knots	Type
Libero Schiaffino	749	595	40	12	Ferry
Dianum	199	345	12	14	Ferry
Costa d'Argento	84,4	390		21	Fast boat
Revenge	93.6	399		20	Fast boat
Polaris	24.5	307		19	Fast boat

=== The fleet of the past ===
- Giuseppe Rum (2005–2012) hired to Toremar
- Oceania (1998–2004)
- Giglio Espresso II (1988–2000)
- Giglio Espresso (1971–1988)
- Freccia del Giglio (hydrofoil) (1975–1987)
- Gabbiano II
- Gabbiano
- Azimut (Fast boat)
- Domizia (Fast boat)
- Vieste II (Fast boat)
- Mizar (Fast boat)

== Routes ==
- Porto Santo Stefano↔Isola del Giglio
- Porto Santo Stefano↔Isola di Giannutri
- Isola del Giglio↔Isola di Giannutri (Summer seasonal route)
- Castiglione della Pescaia↔Isola del Giglio (Summer seasonal route)
- Castiglione della Pescaia↔Portoferraio (Summer seasonal route)

== Events ==
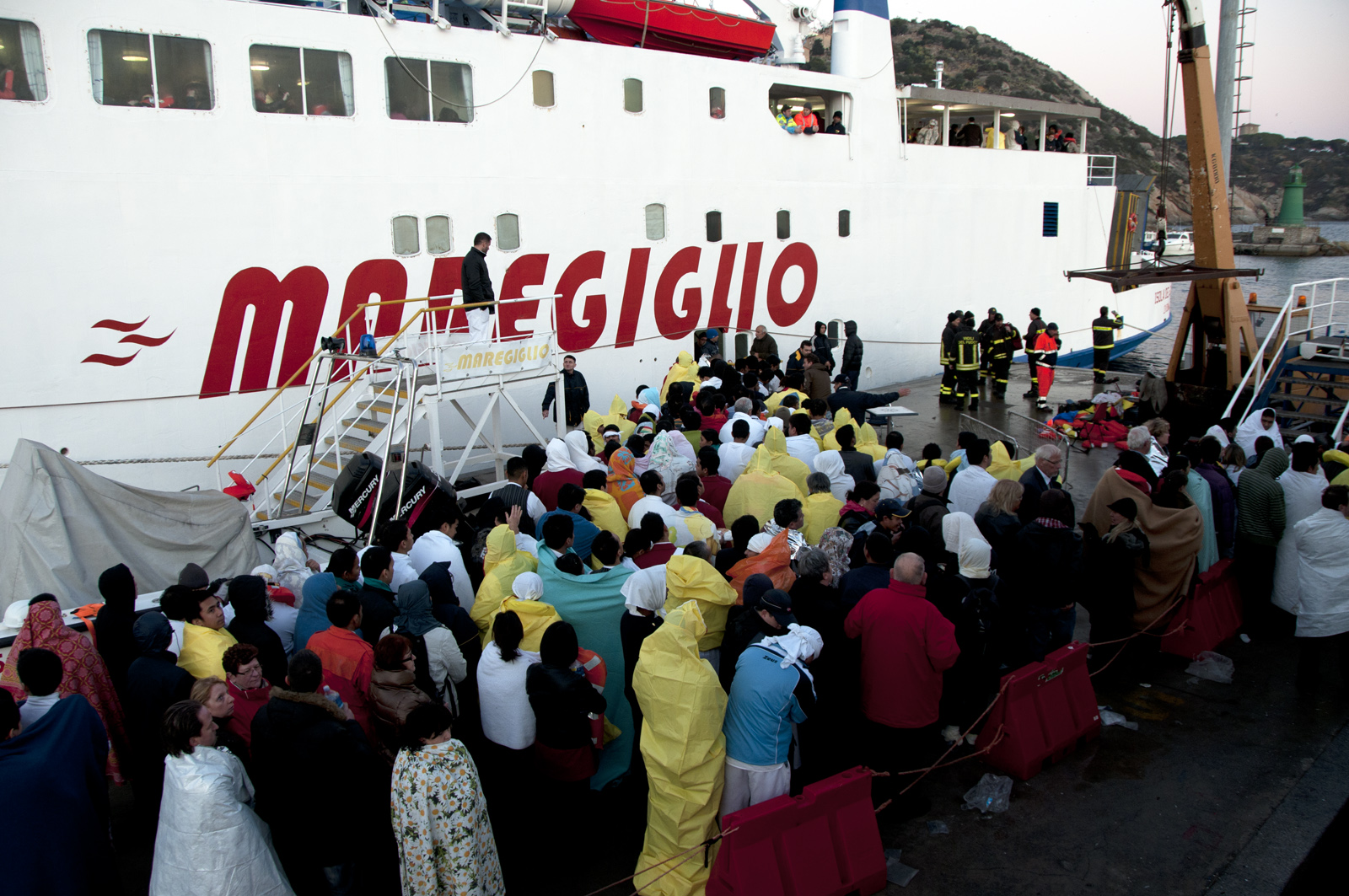
Rescued passengers huddle ashore.

On the night of 13 January 2012 several ships of Maregiglio have been among first to aid in the evacuation of the Costa Concordia wrecked at Isola del Giglio for the transport of passengers shipwrecked with the mainland.

== See also ==
- Monte Argentario
- Tuscan Archipelago
- Costa Concordia disaster
