= Isola del Giglio =

- Comune
- Comune di Isola del Giglio
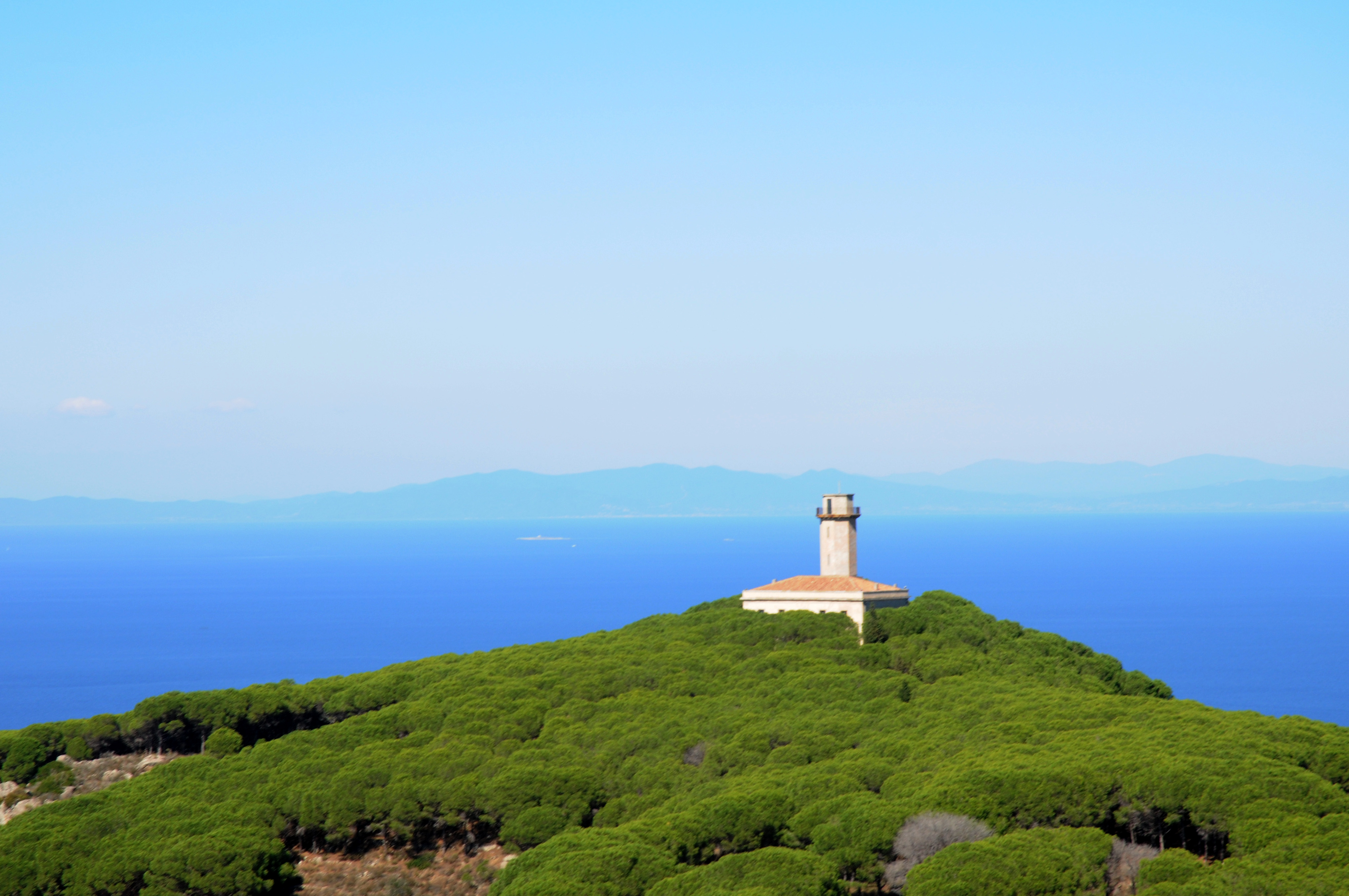
- Old Lighthouse on the north of the island

- Flag

- Location within Italy Location within Tuscany
- Coordinates: 42°21′18″N 10°54′18″E
- Country: Italy
- Region: Tuscany
- Province: Grosseto (GR)
- Frazioni: Isola di Giannutri, Giglio Castello, Giglio Porto, Giglio Campese

Government
  - Mayor: Armando Schiaffino

Area
  - Total: 24.01 km^{2} (9.27 sq mi)
- Elevation: 496 m (1,627 ft)

Population (2026)
  - Total: 1,279
  - Density: 53.27/km^{2} (138.0/sq mi)
- Demonym: Gigliesi
- Time zone: UTC+1 (CET)
  - Summer (DST): UTC+2 (CEST)
- Postal code: 58010, 58012, 58013
- Dialing code: 0564
- Patron saint: San Mamiliano
- Saint day: September 15
- Website: Official website

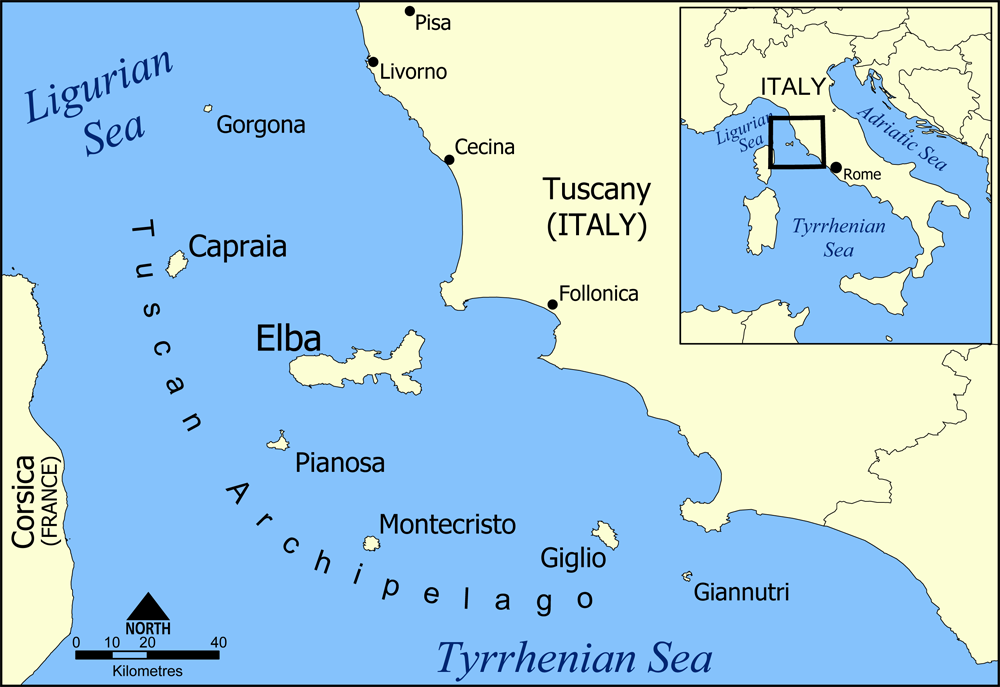

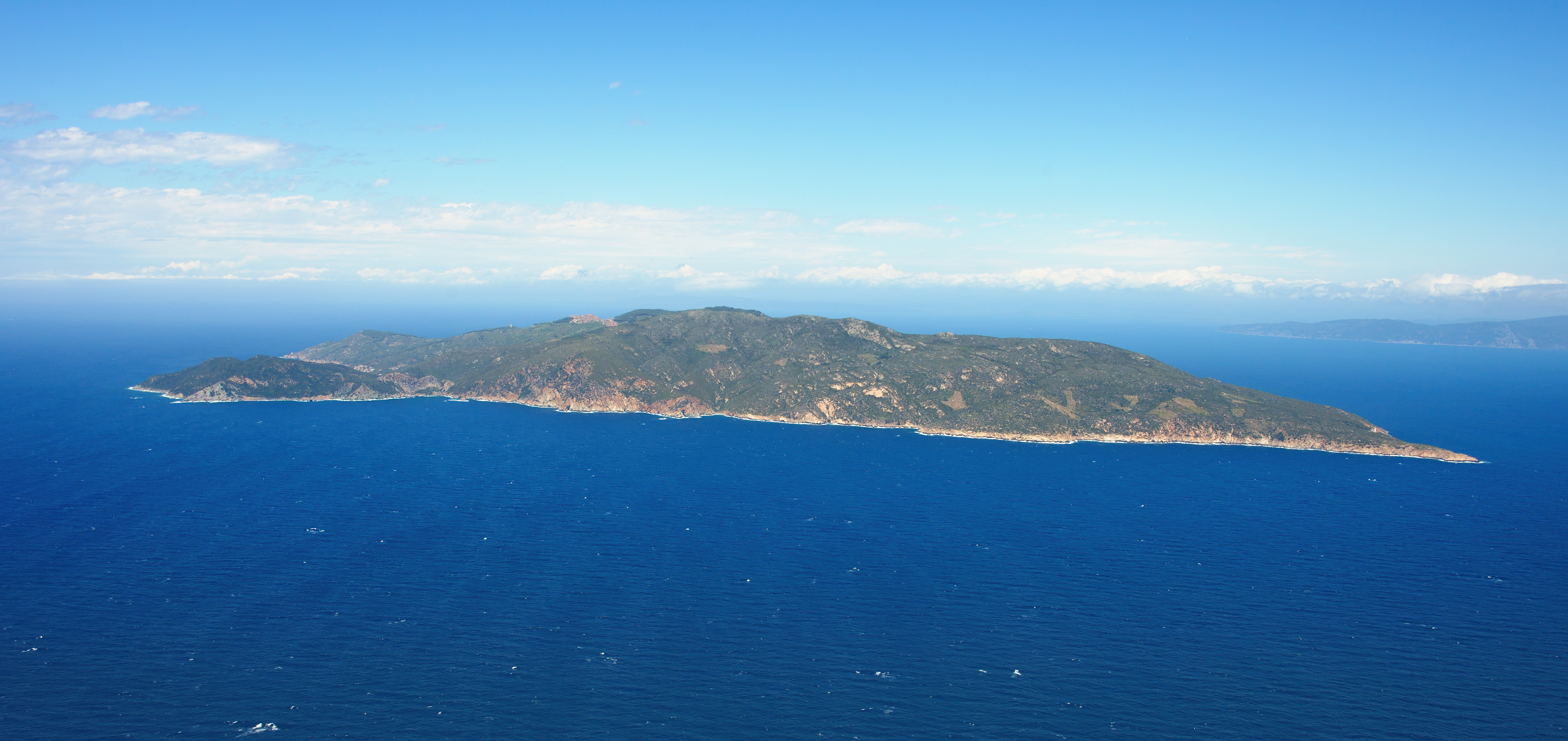
Aerial view of Giglio

Isola del Giglio (Italian pronunciation: [ˈiːzola del ˈdʒiʎʎo]; Latin: Igilium), or Giglio Island in English, is an island and comune (municipality) in the Tyrrhenian Sea, in the Province of Grosseto off the coast of Tuscany in Italy. The island is one of seven that form the Tuscan Archipelago, lying within the Arcipelago Toscano National Park. It has 1,279 inhabitants.

== Etymology ==
Giglio means "lily" in Italian and it originally derives from the Latin name of the island, Igilium, which in turn could be related to the Ancient Greek name of the neighbouring Capraia, Αἰγύλιον (Aigýlion, Latinized as Aegilium), from αἴξ aíx "goat".

== History ==
The modern island was formed probably 4.5 to 5 million years ago, and has been inhabited since the Stone Age. Later, it was potentially an Etruscan military stronghold. Under the Romans it was known as Aegilium Insula or Igillia Insula. It was an important base in the Tyrrhenian Sea, and was cited briefly by Julius Caesar in his De Bello Civili, by Pliny, by Pomponius Mela, and by the fifth-century AD poet Rutilius Claudius Namatianus, who celebrated Igilium's successful repulse of the Getae and safe harbor for Romans, in a time when Igilium's slopes were still wooded.

In 805, the island was donated by Charlemagne to the abbey of the Tre Fontane in Rome, and was later successively a possession of the Aldobrandeschi, Pannocchieschi, Caetani, and Orsini families, and of the municipality of Perugia. In 1241, the Sicilian and Pisan fleet of Emperor Frederick II destroyed a Genoese fleet in the Battle of Giglio. From 1264, Isola del Giglio was a Pisan dominion, then, after being seized by the Spanish fleet, it was ceded to Antonio Piccolomini, nephew of Pius II from whom it passed to the Medici family in 1558. It suffered several Saracen attacks, which ended only in 1799.

Throughout its history, the island was renowned for its mineral ore: many columns and buildings in Rome were built with the Gigliese granite.

On 14 June 1646, Grand Admiral Jean Armand de Maillé-Brézé was killed at the Battle of Orbetello near the island, at sunset on his flagship the Grand Saint Louis.

In 2012, the cruise ship Costa Concordia foundered off the coast of the island.

In July 2020, the island attracted global attention because it had not yet experienced any known cases of COVID-19 in the COVID-19 pandemic.

== Geography ==
The island is separated by a 16 km (10 mi) stretch of sea from the nearest point of the mainland, the promontory of Monte Argentario. Mainly mountainous, it consists almost entirely of granite, culminating in the Poggio della Pagana, which rises to 496 m (1,627 ft). Ninety percent of its surface is covered by Mediterranean vegetation, alternating with large pine forests and numerous vineyards which allow the production of the local "Ansonaco" wine. The coast is 27 km (17 mi) long, made up of rocks, smooth cliffs and several bays: Arenella, Cannelle, Caldane and Campese, the biggest one with its small village of the same name.

The municipality is composed of the islands of Giglio and Giannutri. Three principal settlements are located on the main island:

- Giglio Porto (G. Harbour), located on the eastern coastal side and hosts the port. It is divided into the quarters of Chiesa, Moletto and Saraceno.
- Giglio Castello (G. Castle), located upon a hill between the two other localities and characterized by the majestic walls of a fortress. It is divided into the quarters of Casamatta, Centro, Cisterna and Rocca.
- Giglio Campese, it is located on the north-western coastal side and is a modern sea resort.

== Demographics ==
As of 2026, the population is 1,279, of which 54.0% are male, and 46.0% are female. Minors make up 8.4% of the population, and seniors make up 34.4%.

Historical population

| Year | Pop. | ±% |
|---|---|---|
| 1861 | 1,920 | — |
| 1871 | 2,037 | +6.1% |
| 1881 | 2,127 | +4.4% |
| 1901 | 2,350 | +10.5% |
| 1911 | 2,295 | −2.3% |
| 1921 | 2,231 | −2.8% |
| 1931 | 2,229 | −0.1% |
| 1936 | 2,143 | −3.9% |

| Year | Pop. | ±% |
|---|---|---|
| 1951 | 2,356 | +9.9% |
| 1961 | 2,259 | −4.1% |
| 1971 | 1,711 | −24.3% |
| 1981 | 1,660 | −3.0% |
| 1991 | 1,558 | −6.1% |
| 2001 | 1,406 | −9.8% |
| 2011 | 1,418 | +0.9% |
| 2021 | 1,344 | −5.2% |

Source: ISTAT

=== Immigration ===
As of 2025, immigrants make up 15.0% of the population. The 5 largest foreign countries of birth are Albania, Romania, Poland, Germany, and Kyrgyzstan.

== Government ==
=== List of mayors ===
| Mayor | Term start | Term end | Party |
|---|---|---|---|
| Giacomo Landini | 1995 | 2004 | National Alliance |
| Attilio Brothel | 2004 | 2009 | Civic |
| Sergio Ortelli | 2009 | 2024 | The People of Freedom/Civic |
| Armando Schiaffino | 2024 | Incumbent | Centre-left |

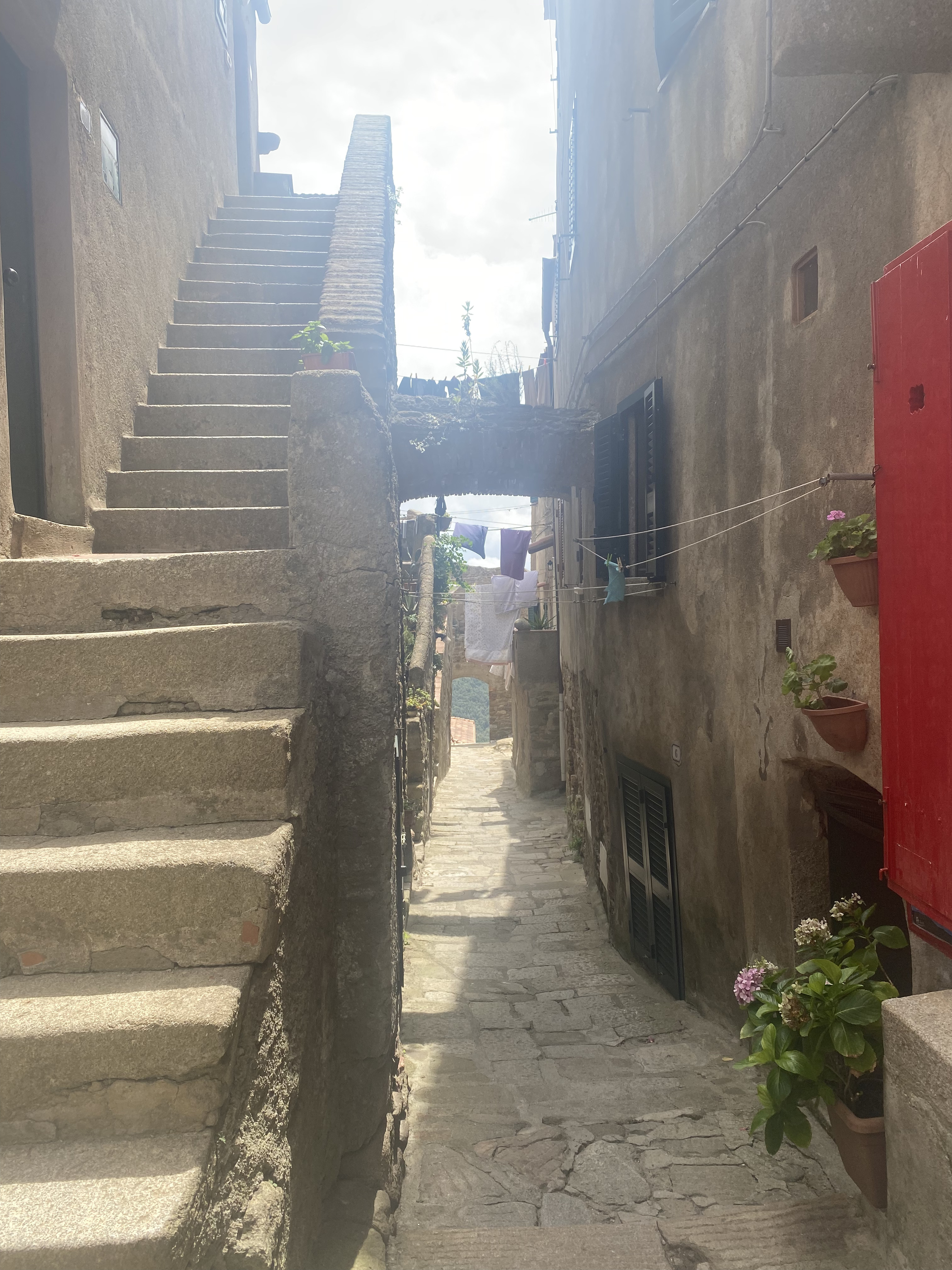
a narrow pad on the island

== Main sights ==
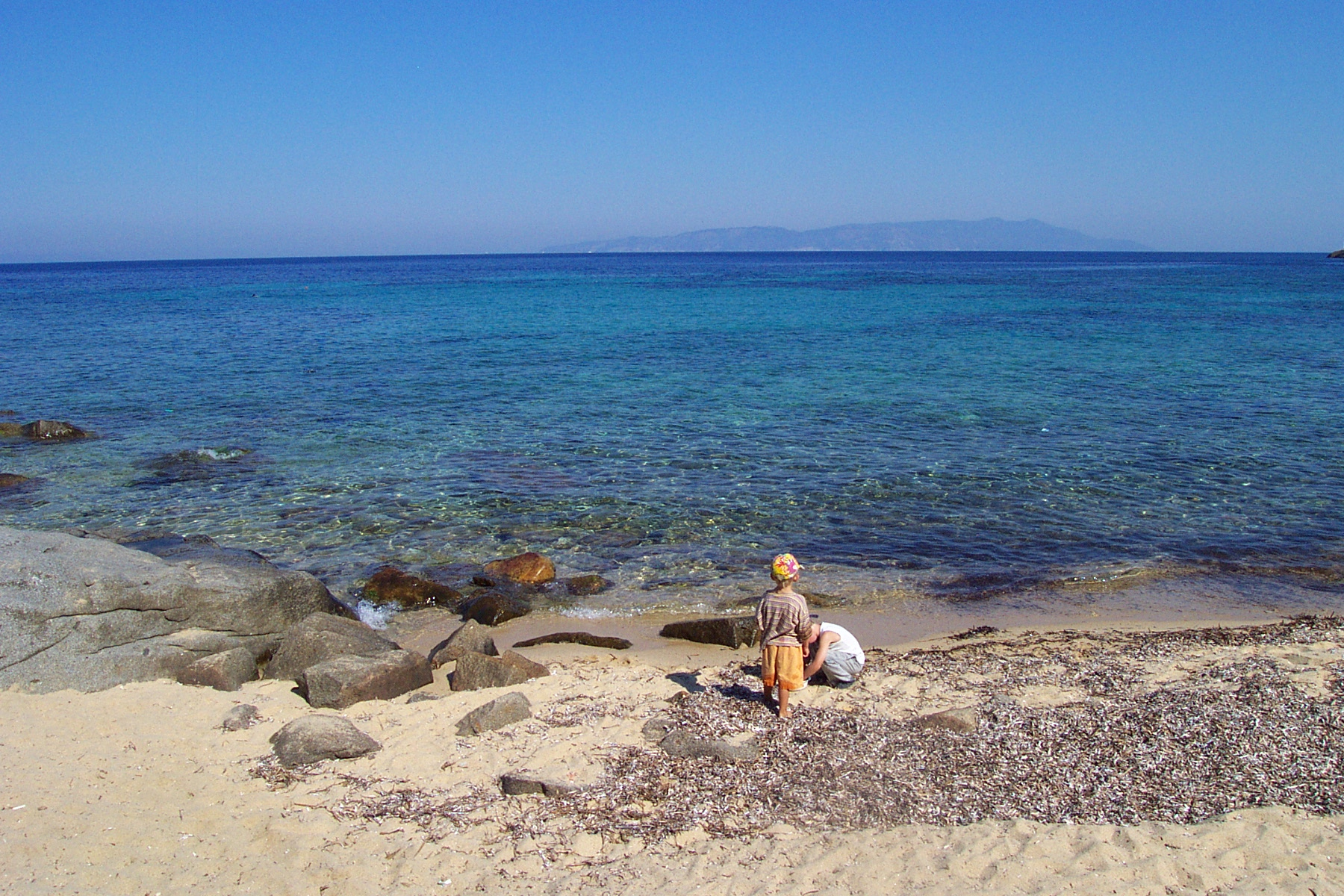
"Arenella" beach with a view of Monte Argentario on the nearby Tuscan coast

The island houses the remains of a Roman villa of Domitius Ahenobarbus (1st-2nd century AD), in the area of Giglio Porto (Giglio port). No traces of the once existing Temple of Diana can be seen now. The church of San Pietro Apostolo in Giglio Castello (Giglio castle) has an ivory crucifix attributed to the sculptor Giambologna.

The island is also the site of an Etruscan shipwreck dating back to the early Iron Age, c. 600 BC. The cargo of the ship included copper and lead ingots, iron spits, amphorae and a Corinthian helmet. Even a wooden writing tablet with stylus was preserved. The finds are almost completely lost now.

== Transport ==
Isola del Giglio is connected to Tuscany by ferries run by the shipping companies Toremar and Maregiglio, departing daily from Porto Santo Stefano.

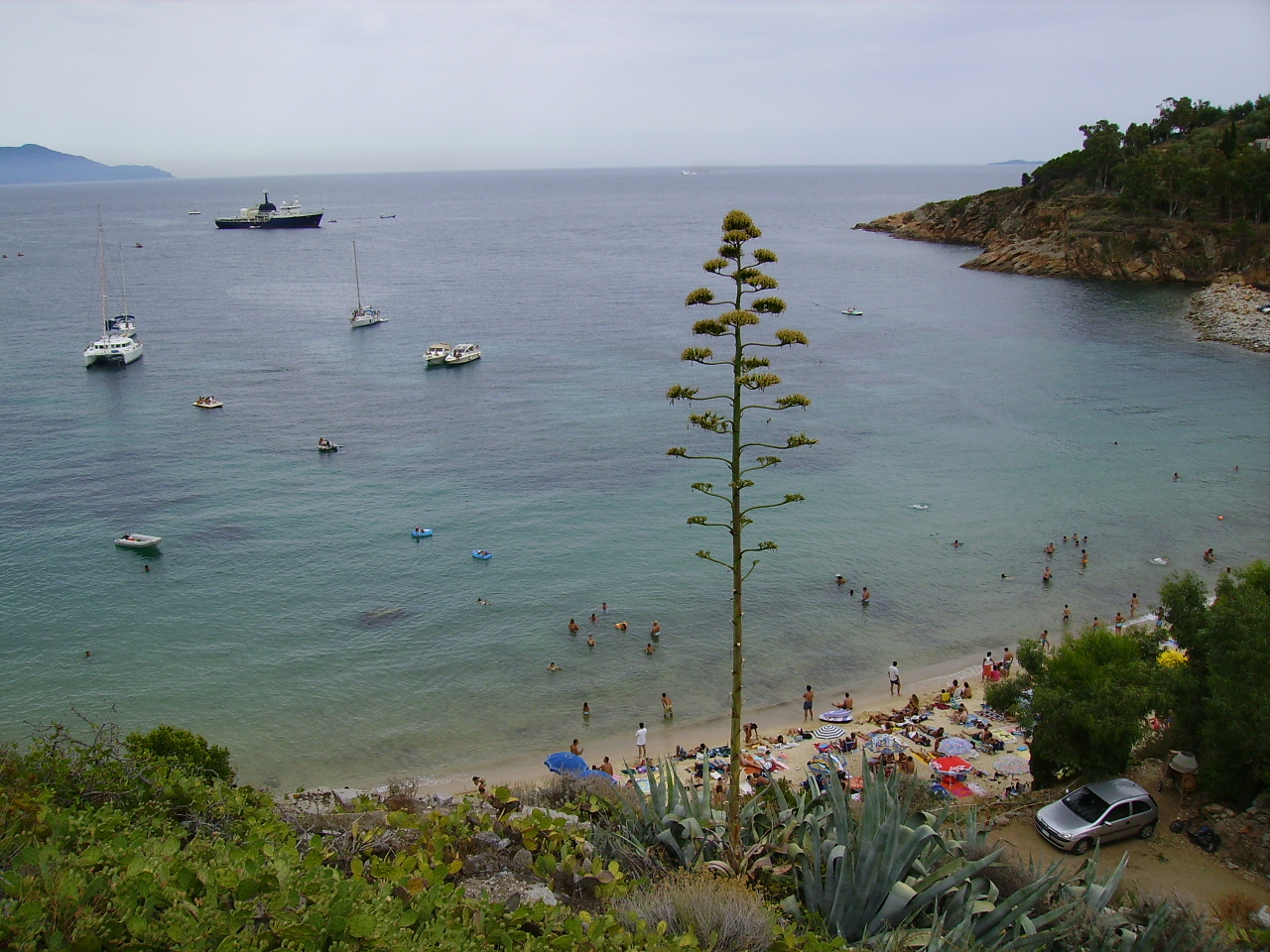
Cannelle Beach

=== Costa Concordia grounding incident ===
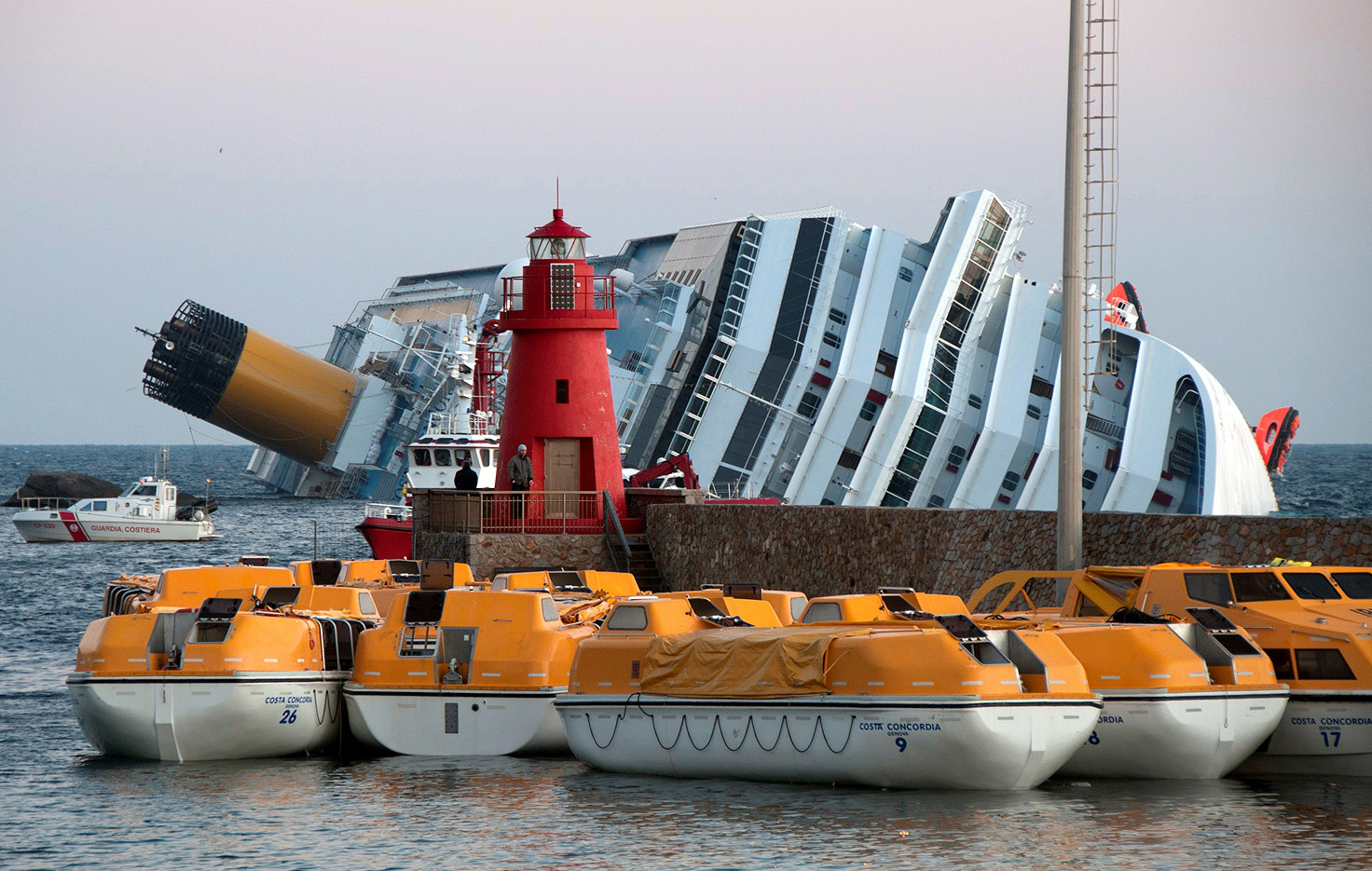
Costa Concordia partially floating

In 2012, the island received prolonged international media attention, following the 13 January 2012 running aground of the cruise liner Costa Concordia, just off the island's shore. Most of the more than 4,200 passengers and crew were rescued and taken to the island, as well as to the mainland. 32 people died and 64 were injured. The people of the island rushed to help, providing hot drinks and blankets, and many opened their homes to the victims. The arrival of 2,000 salvage workers invigorated life on the island, and many of the workers fraternised with the islanders. Some local women left the island with their new partners.

The ship removal work was started in 2013 and was completed towards the end of July 2014. Flotation devices were attached to right the ship and then raise it. It was subsequently towed to its final destination port of Genoa to be scrapped.

== In popular fiction ==
In the 2007 romantic bestselling Italian novel Scusa ma ti chiamo amore by Federico Moccia, the couple end up living in a lighthouse on this island.

It is also the site of the sea burial of the captain of The Pharaon in The Count of Monte Cristo.

It features in the novel Still Life by Sarah Winman.

== Sister cities ==
- Italy, San Quirico d'Orcia since 2013

== See also ==
- List of islands of Italy
- Tuscan Archipelago
