= Giglio Campese =

- Frazione
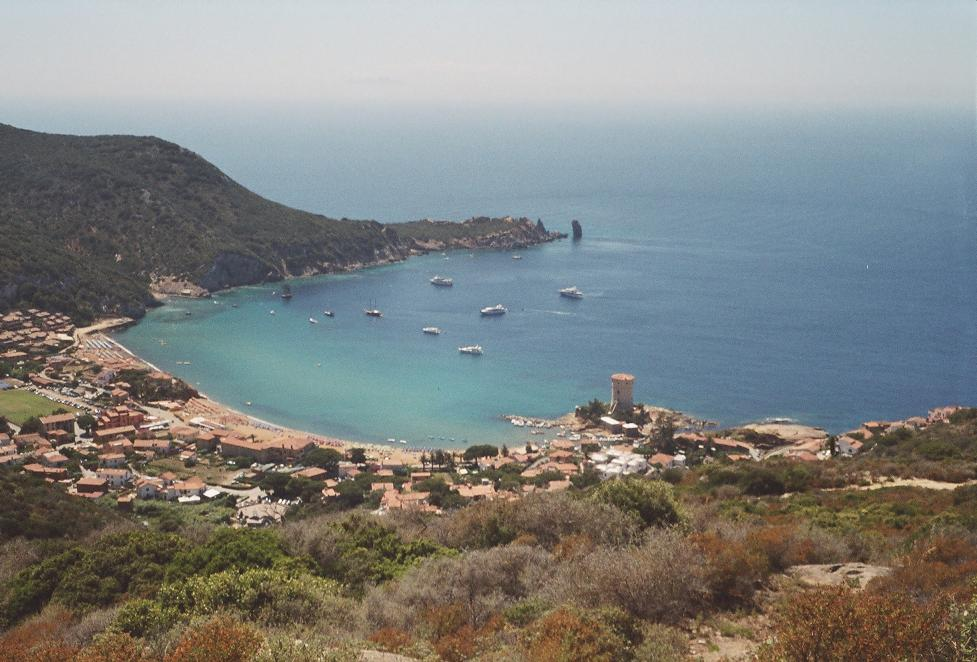
- View of Giglio Campese

- Location of Giglio Campese in Italy
- Coordinates: 42°22′04″N 10°52′59″E
- Country: Italy
- Region: Tuscany
- Province: Grosseto (GR)
- Comune: Isola del Giglio
- Elevation: 3 m (9.8 ft)

Population (2011)
  - Total: 187
- Time zone: UTC+1 (CET)
  - Summer (DST): UTC+2 (CEST)
- Postal code: 58010
- Dialing code: (+39) 0564

Giglio Campese is a village in Tuscany, central Italy, administratively a frazione of the comune of Isola del Giglio, province of Grosseto. At the time of the 2001 census its population amounted to 154.

== Geography ==
Giglio Campese is located on the north-western coastal side of Giglio Island and it is about 5 km from the municipal seat of Giglio Castello. It is an important seaside resort and one of the three towns on the island – along with Giglio Castello and Giglio Porto.

== Main sights ==
- San Rocco (20th century), the main church of the village, it was built in 1993 and it is included in the parish of San Pietro Apostolo in Giglio Castello.
- Tower of Campese, built as a coastal defense tower by Cosimo I de' Medici in the late 16th century, it was then transformed into a private house.

== See also ==
- Giannutri
