= Giglio Castello =

- Frazione
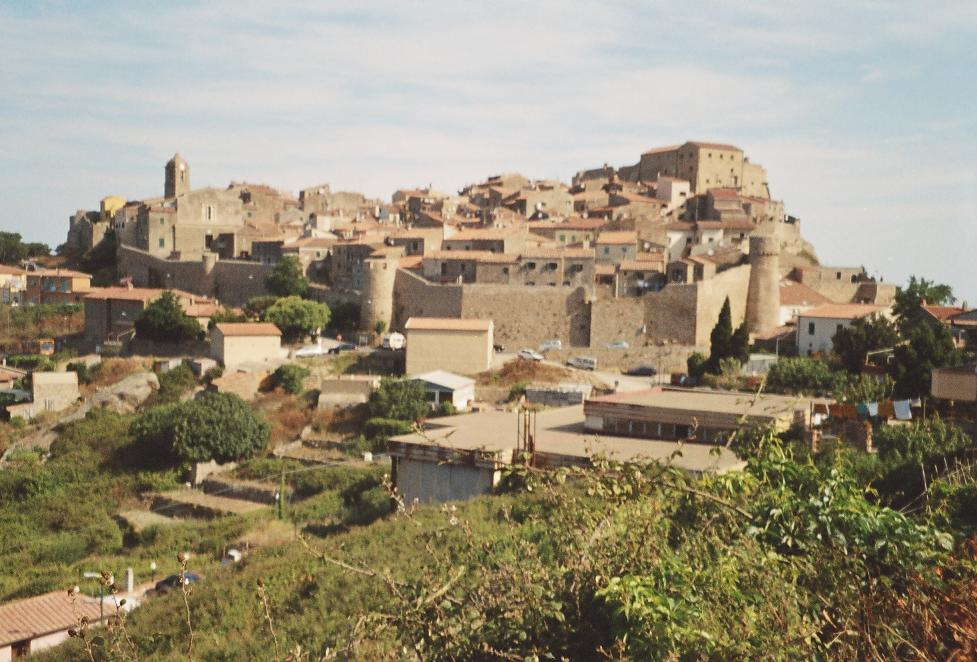
- View of Giglio Castello

- Location of Giglio Castello in Italy
- Coordinates: 42°21′56″N 10°54′06″E
- Country: Italy
- Region: Tuscany
- Province: Grosseto (GR)
- Comune: Isola del Giglio
- Elevation: 405 m (1,329 ft)

Population (2011)
  - Total: 557
- Demonym(s): Gigliesi, Gigliesini
- Time zone: UTC+1 (CET)
  - Summer (DST): UTC+2 (CEST)
- Postal code: 58012
- Dialing code: (+39) 0564

Giglio Castello is a village in Tuscany, central Italy, administratively a frazione of the comune of Isola del Giglio, province of Grosseto. At the time of the 2001 census its population amounted to 568. It is one of I Borghi più belli d'Italia ("The most beautiful villages of Italy").

== Geography ==
Giglio Castello is located upon a hill in the centre of Giglio Island, between the villages of Giglio Campese and Giglio Porto, and it is the municipal capital of the comune. It is an ancient medieval borough characterized by the majestic walls of a fortress.

Castello is divided into the quarters of Casamatta, Centro, Cisterna and Rocca.

== Main sights ==
- San Pietro (12th century), the main church of the village, it was completely restructured in 1755 in a Baroque style.
- Rocca aldobrandesca (castle), it was built by the Aldobrandeschi in the early Middle Ages and then restructured by the Republic of Pisa after the Pisan invasion of the island in the 13th century.
- Walls of Giglio Castello, old fortifications which surround the village since 12th century.

== Bibliography ==
- Marco Lambertini, Isola del Giglio. Natura, storia, escursioni via terra e via mare, Pisa, Pacini Editore, 1989.

== See also ==
- Giannutri
- Giglio Campese
- Giglio Porto
