= Giglio Porto =

- Frazione
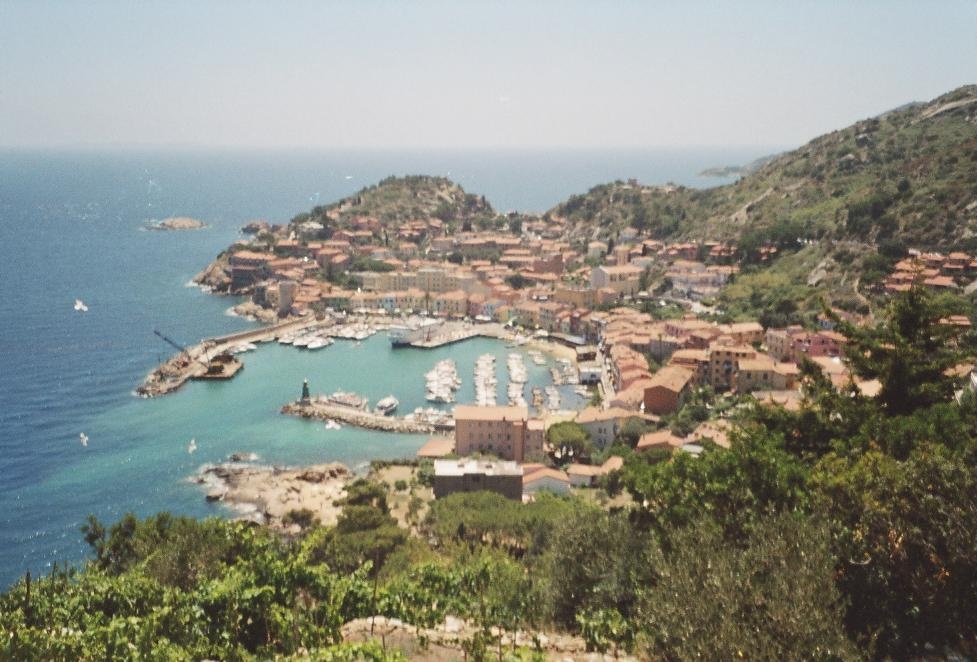
- View of Giglio Porto

- Location of Giglio Porto in Italy
- Coordinates: 42°21′34″N 10°55′12″E
- Country: Italy
- Region: Tuscany
- Province: Grosseto (GR)
- Comune: Isola del Giglio
- Elevation: 9 m (30 ft)

Population (2021)
  - Total: 750
- Demonym: Portolani
- Time zone: UTC+1 (CET)
  - Summer (DST): UTC+2 (CEST)
- Postal code: 58013
- Dialing code: (+39) 0564

Giglio Porto is a village in Tuscany, central Italy, administratively a frazione of the comune of Isola del Giglio, province of Grosseto. As of 2021, its population amounted to 750.

== Geography ==
Giglio Porto is located on the eastern coastal side and hosts the main harbour of Giglio Island. It is an important seaside resort and the most populous one among the three towns on the island – the other ones are Giglio Castello and Giglio Campese.

Porto is divided into the quarters of Chiesa, Moletto and Saraceno.

== Main sights ==
- Santi Lorenzo e Mamiliano (20th century), the main parish church of the village, it was consecrated in 1958 and designed by engineer Ernesto Ganelli.
- Tower of Saraceno, built during the Middle Ages, it was restructured by Cosimo I de' Medici in the late 16th century.
- Tower of Lazzaretto, it was completed in 1624.

== Costa Concordia incident ==
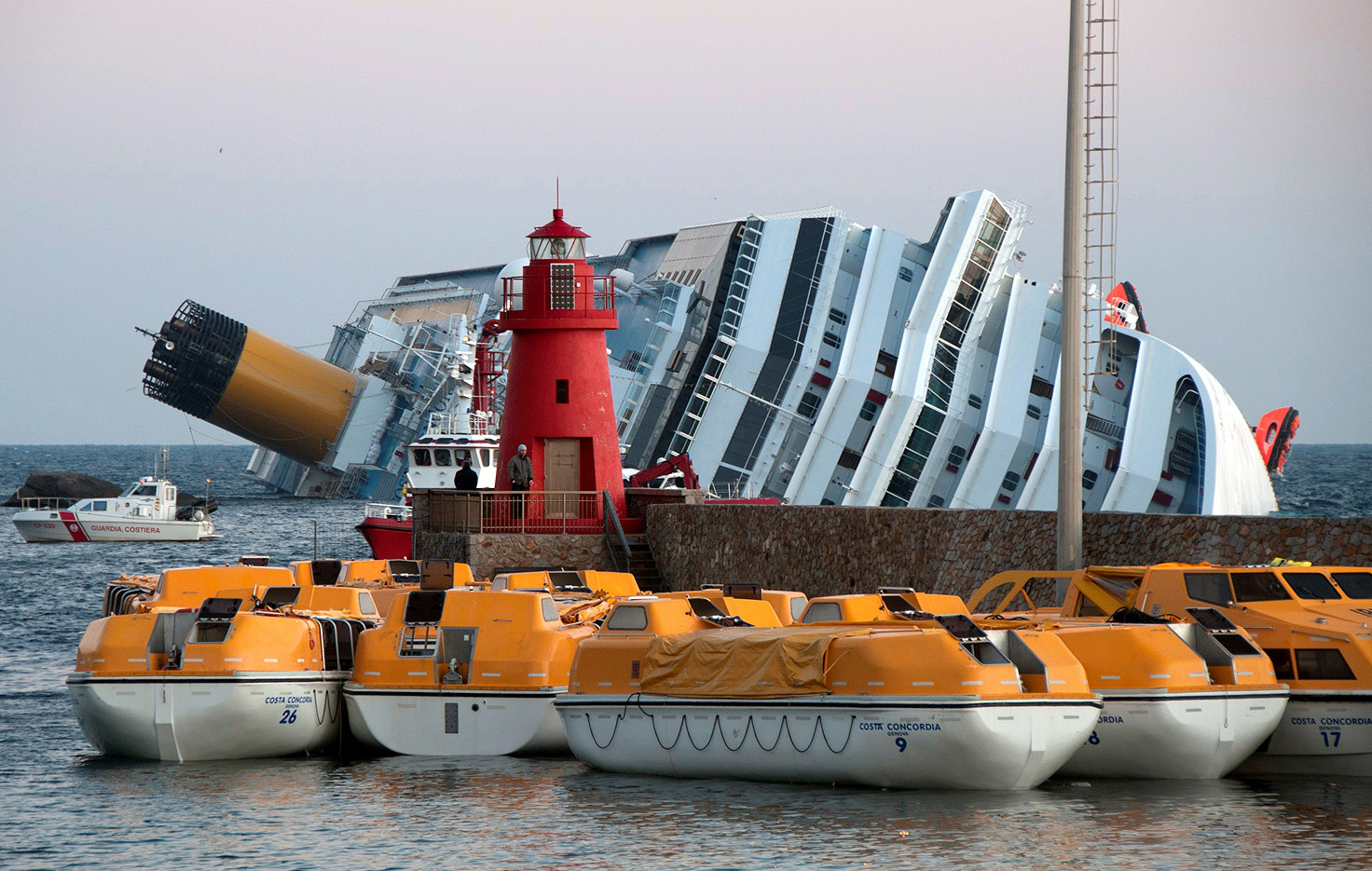
Costa Concordia partially floating

In 2012, the village received prolonged international media attention, following the 13 January 2012 running aground of the cruise liner Costa Concordia, just off the town's harbour. Most of the more than 4,200 passengers and crew were rescued and taken to the island, as well as to the mainland. 32 people died and 64 were injured. The ship removal work was started in 2013 and was completed towards the end of July 2014, with the now active ship making its final journey to Genoa, for scrapping.

== Bibliography ==
- Marco Lambertini, Isola del Giglio. Natura, storia, escursioni via terra e via mare, Pisa, Pacini Editore, 1989.

== See also ==
- Giannutri
- Giglio Campese
- Giglio Castello
