= Tyrrhenian Sea =

Part of the Mediterranean Sea off the western coast of Italy

- Interactive map of Tyrrhenian Sea
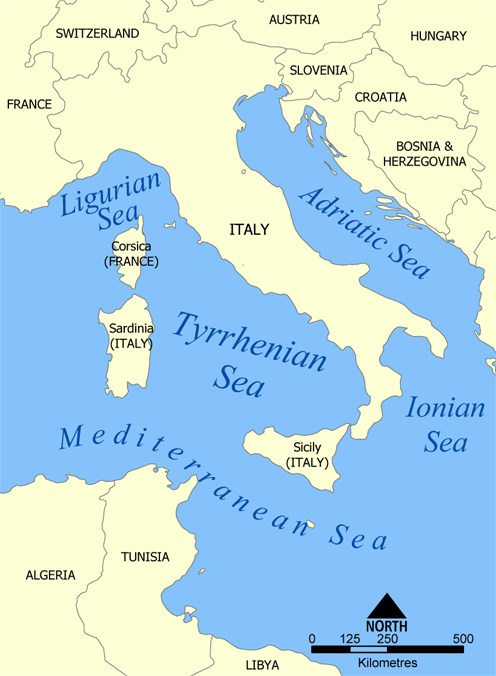
- Tyrrhenian Sea
- Location: Mediterranean Sea
- Coordinates: 40°N 12°E
- Type: Sea
- Etymology: From the ancient people of Tyrrhenians
- Basin countries: Italy, France
- Surface area: 275,000 km^{2} (106,200 sq mi)
- Average depth: 2,000 m (6,562 ft)
- Max. depth: 3,785 m (12,418 ft)

The Tyrrhenian Sea (/tɪˈriːniən/ tih-REE-nee-ən) (Note: Italian: Mar Tirreno [mar tirˈrɛːno] French: Mer Tyrrhénienne [mɛʁ tiʁenjɛn] Latin: Tyrrhēnum mare, Sardinian: Mare Tirrenu, Corsican: Mari Tirrenu, Sicilian: Mari Tirrenu, Neapolitan: Mare Tirreno) is part of the Mediterranean Sea off the western coast of Italy. Its namesake is from the Tyrrhenian people, identified with the Etruscans of Italy.

== Geography ==
The sea is bounded by the islands of Corsica and Sardinia (to the west), the Italian Peninsula (regions of Tuscany, Lazio, Campania, Basilicata, and Calabria) to the north and east, and the island of Sicily (to the south). The Tyrrhenian Sea also includes a number of smaller islands like Capri, Elba, Ischia, and Ustica.

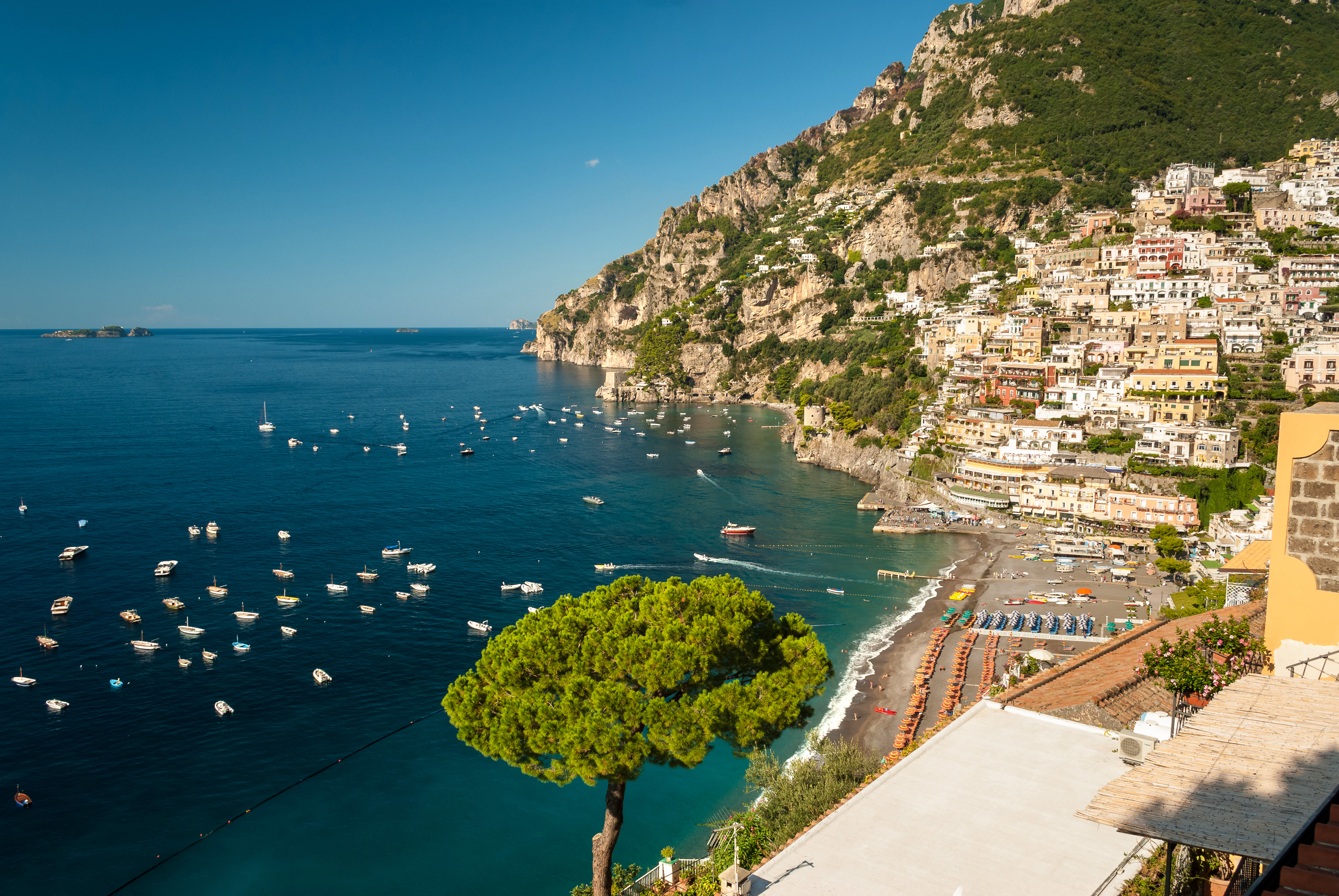
Amalfi Coast, Positano

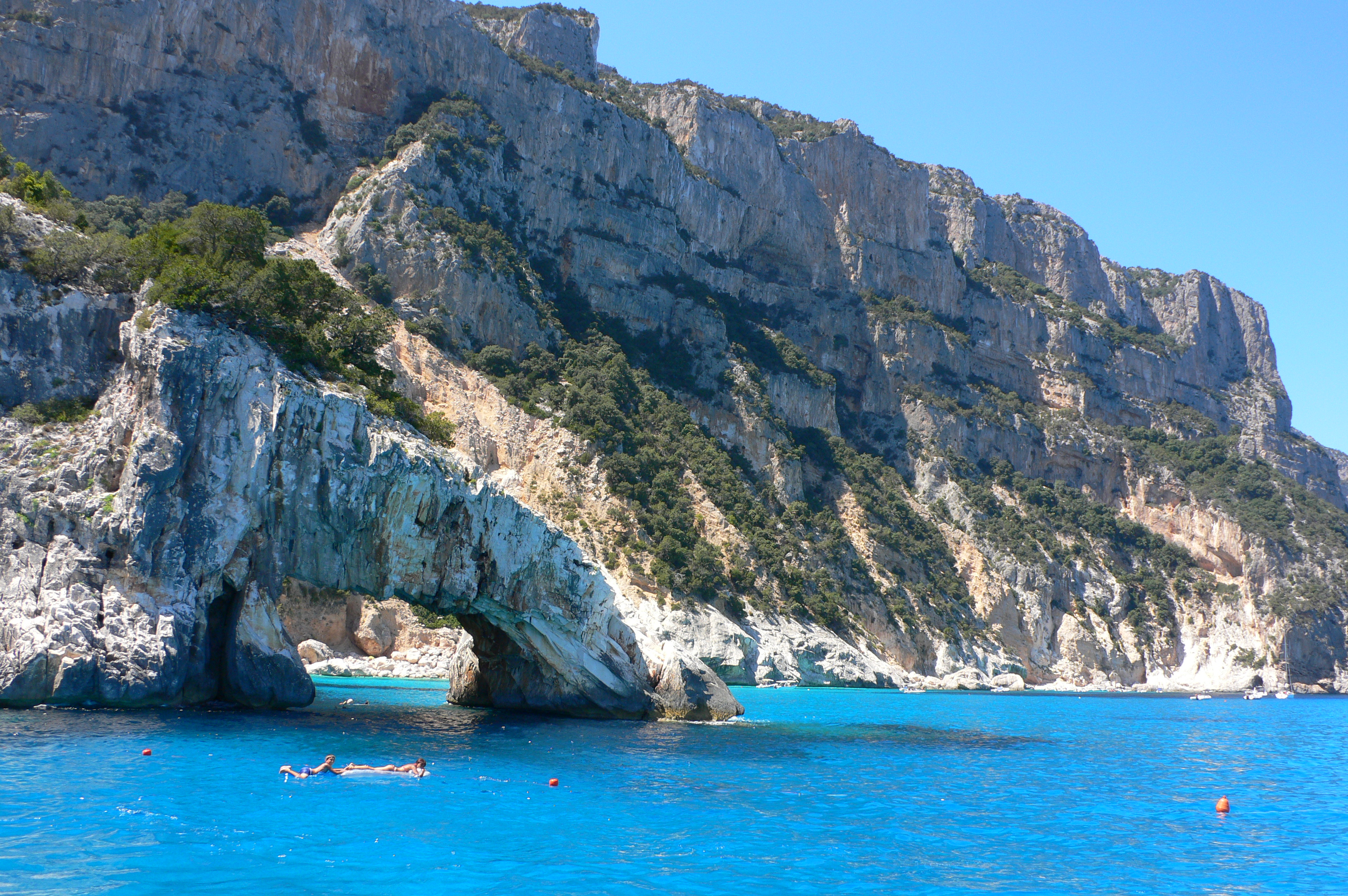
Cala Goloritzé, Baunei, Sardinia

The maximum depth of the sea is 3,785 metres (12,418 ft).

The Tyrrhenian Sea is situated near where the African and Eurasian Plates meet; therefore mountain chains and active volcanoes, such as Mount Marsili, are found in its depths. The eight Aeolian Islands and Ustica are located in the southern part of the sea, north of Sicily.

=== Caprera Canyon ===
Within The Tyrrhenian Sea at a depth of 1,000 metres (3,281 ft) is a geographical location known as the Caprera Canyon. An exploration conducted by The One Ocean Foundation revealed colonies of rare sponges, corals and numerous fish species, many of them being endangered or at risk. The biology of the canyon is currently at risk as of 17 November 2025. This is due to an increase in travel based pollution and Bottom Trawling. The One Ocean Foundation is pursuing multiple layers of protection that are currently not provided for this area.

=== Extent ===
The International Hydrographic Organization defines the limits of the Tyrrhenian Sea as follows:

- In the Strait of Messina: A line joining the North extreme of Cape Paci (15°42′E) with the East extreme of the Island of Sicily, Cape Peloro (38°16′N).
- On the Southwest: A line running from Cape Lilibeo (West extreme of Sicily) to the South extreme of Cape Teulada (8°38′E) in Sardinia.
- In the Strait of Bonifacio: A line joining the West extreme of Cape Testa (41°14′N) in Sardinia with the Southwest extreme of Cape Feno (41°23′N) in Corsica.
- On the North: A line joining Cape Corse (Cape Grosso, 9°23′E) in Corsica, with Tinetto Island (44°01′N 9°51′E) and thence through Tino and Palmaria islands to San Pietro Point (44°03′N 9°50′E) on the coast of Italy.

=== Exits ===
There are four exits from the Tyrrhenian Sea (north to south):

Exit	Location	Width	Connected Sea
Corsica Channel	between Tuscany and Corsica 42°50′N 9°45′E	about 80 kilometres (50 mi)	Ligurian Sea
Strait of Bonifacio	between Corsica and Sardinia	11 kilometres (6.8 mi)	Mediterranean Sea (proper)
no name	between Sardinia and Sicily	about 290 kilometres (180 mi)	Mediterranean Sea (proper)
Strait of Messina	between Sicily and Calabria on the toe of Italy	3 kilometres (1.9 mi)	Ionian Sea

=== Basins ===
The Tyrrhenian Basin is divided into two basins (or plains), the Vavilov plain and the Marsili plain. They are separated by the undersea ridge known as the Issel Bridge, after Arturo Issel.

== Geology ==
The Tyrrhenian Sea is a back-arc basin that formed due to the rollback of the Calabrian slab towards South-East during the Neogene. Episodes of fast and slow trench retreat formed first the Vavilov basin and, then, the Marsili basin. Submarine volcanoes and the active volcano Mount Stromboli formed because trench retreat produces extension in the overriding plate allowing the mantle to rise below the surface and partially melt. The magmatism here is also affected by the fluids released from the slab.

== Name ==
Its name derives from the Greek name for the Etruscans, first mentioned by Hesiod in the 8th century BC who described them as residing in central Italy alongside the Latins. The Etruscans lived along the coast of modern Tuscany, Latium and Campania, and referred to the water as the "Sea of the Etruscans".

== Islands ==
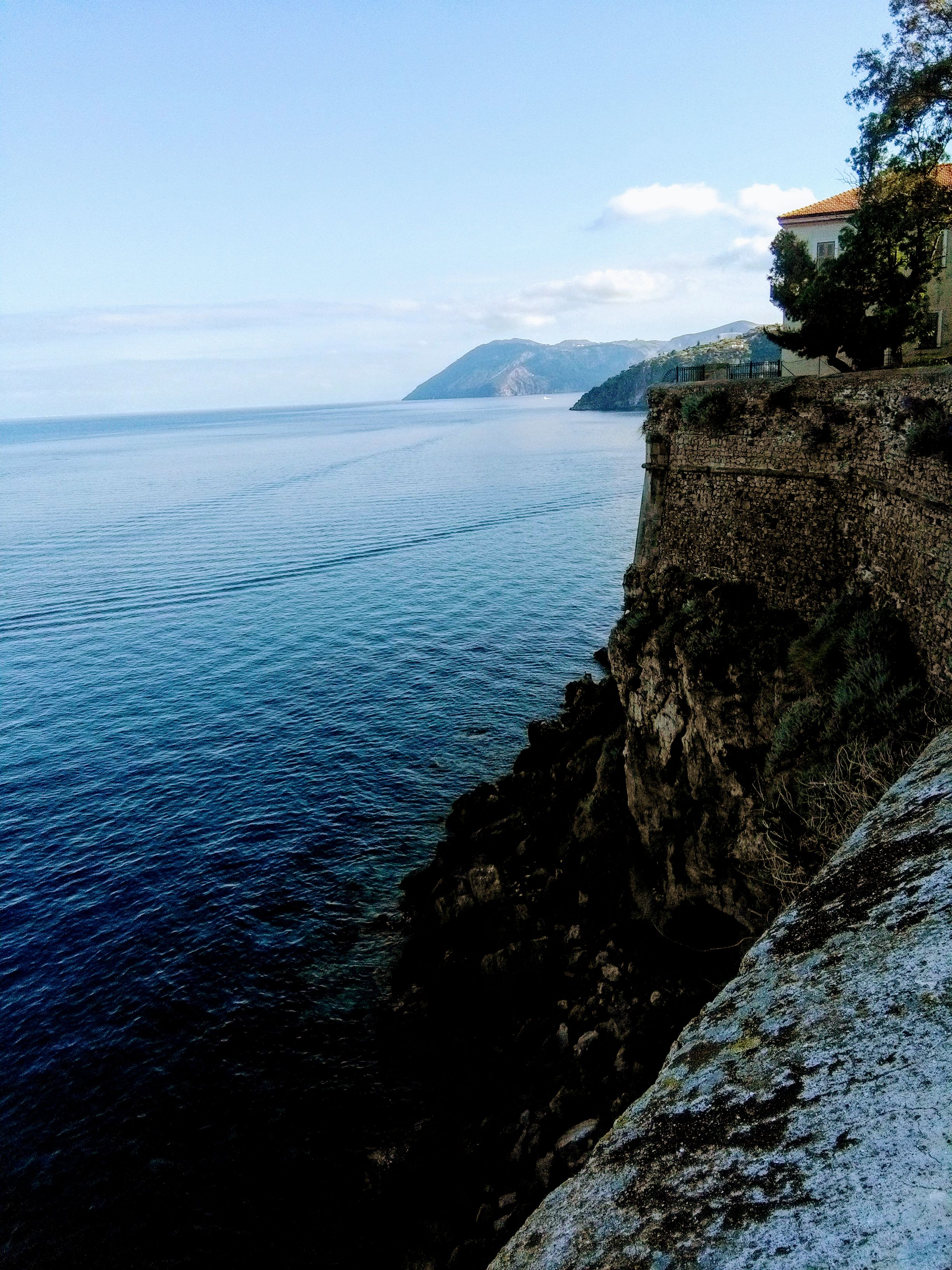
Lipari, Aeolian Islands, Sicily

Islands of the Tyrrhenian Sea include:

- Corsica
- Sardinia
- Sicily
- Tuscan Archipelago
- Ischia
- Procida
- Capri
- Ustica
- Aeolian Islands (including Lipari and Stromboli)
- Pontine Islands including Ponza

== Ports ==
The main ports of the Tyrrhenian Sea in Italy are: Naples, Palermo, Civitavecchia (Rome), Salerno, Trapani, and Gioia Tauro. There is also Bastia, located in Corsica.

Note that even though the phrase "port of Rome" is frequently used, there is in fact no port in Rome. Instead, the "port of Rome" refers to the maritime facilities at Civitavecchia, some 68 km (42 miles) to the northwest of Rome.

Giglio Porto is a small island port in this area. It rose to prominence, when the Costa Concordia ran aground near the coast of Giglio and sank. The ship was later refloated and towed to Genoa for scrapping.

== Winds ==
In Greek mythology, it is believed that the cliffs above the Tyrrhenian Sea housed the four winds kept by Aeolus. The winds are the Mistral from the Rhône valley, the Libeccio from the southwest, and the Sirocco and Ostro from the south.

== Image gallery ==
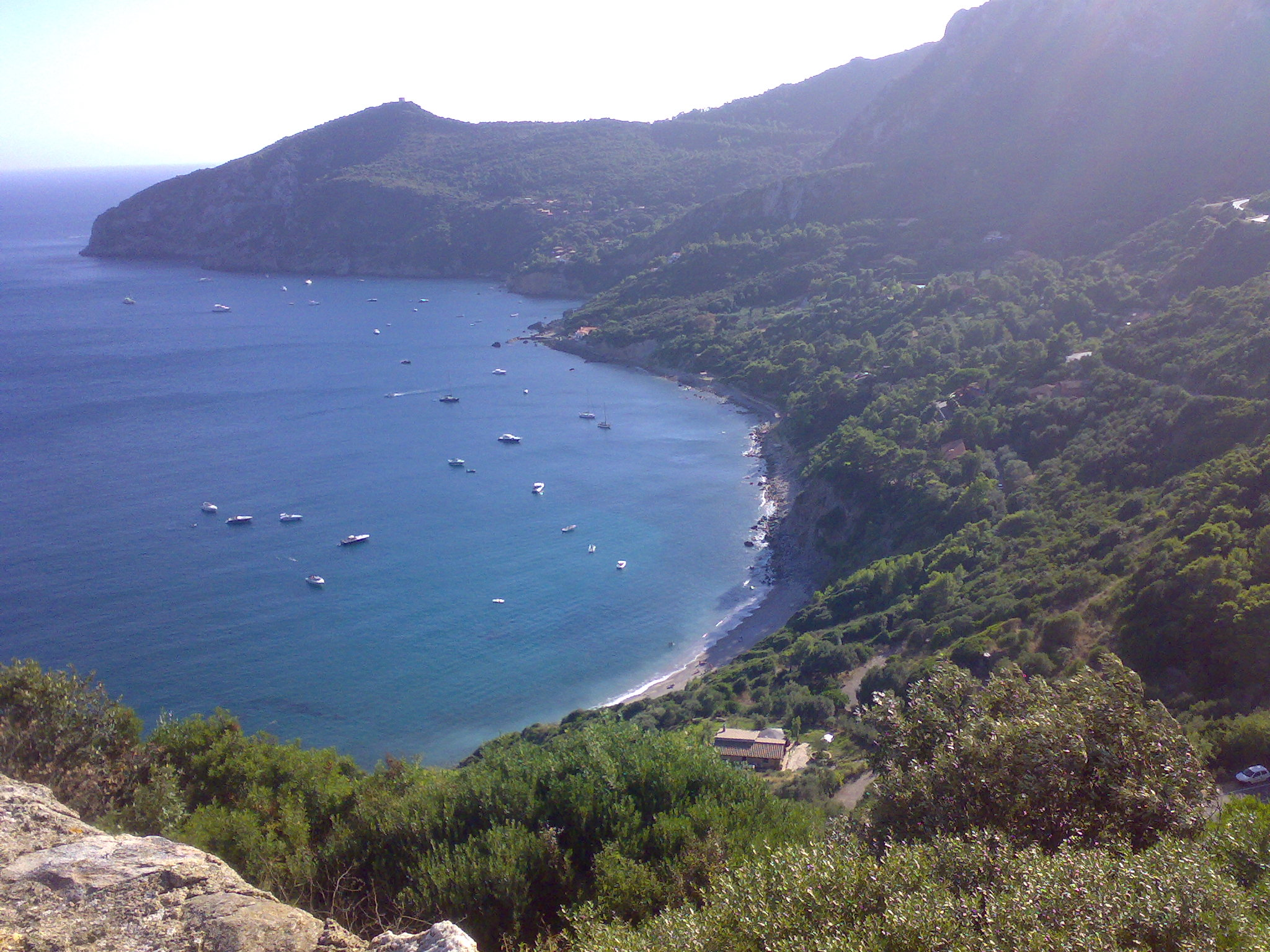
Monte Argentario

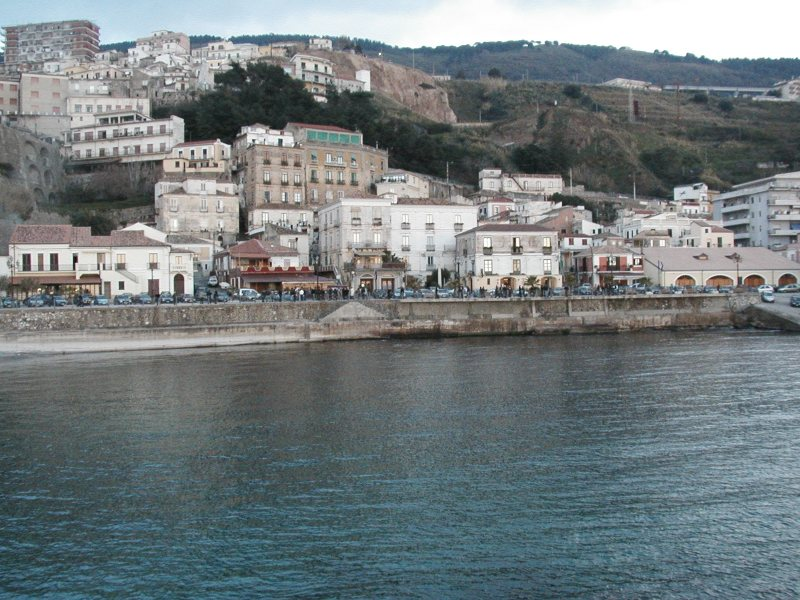
Pizzo

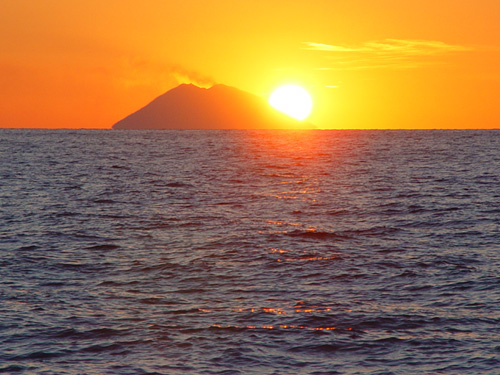
Zambrone

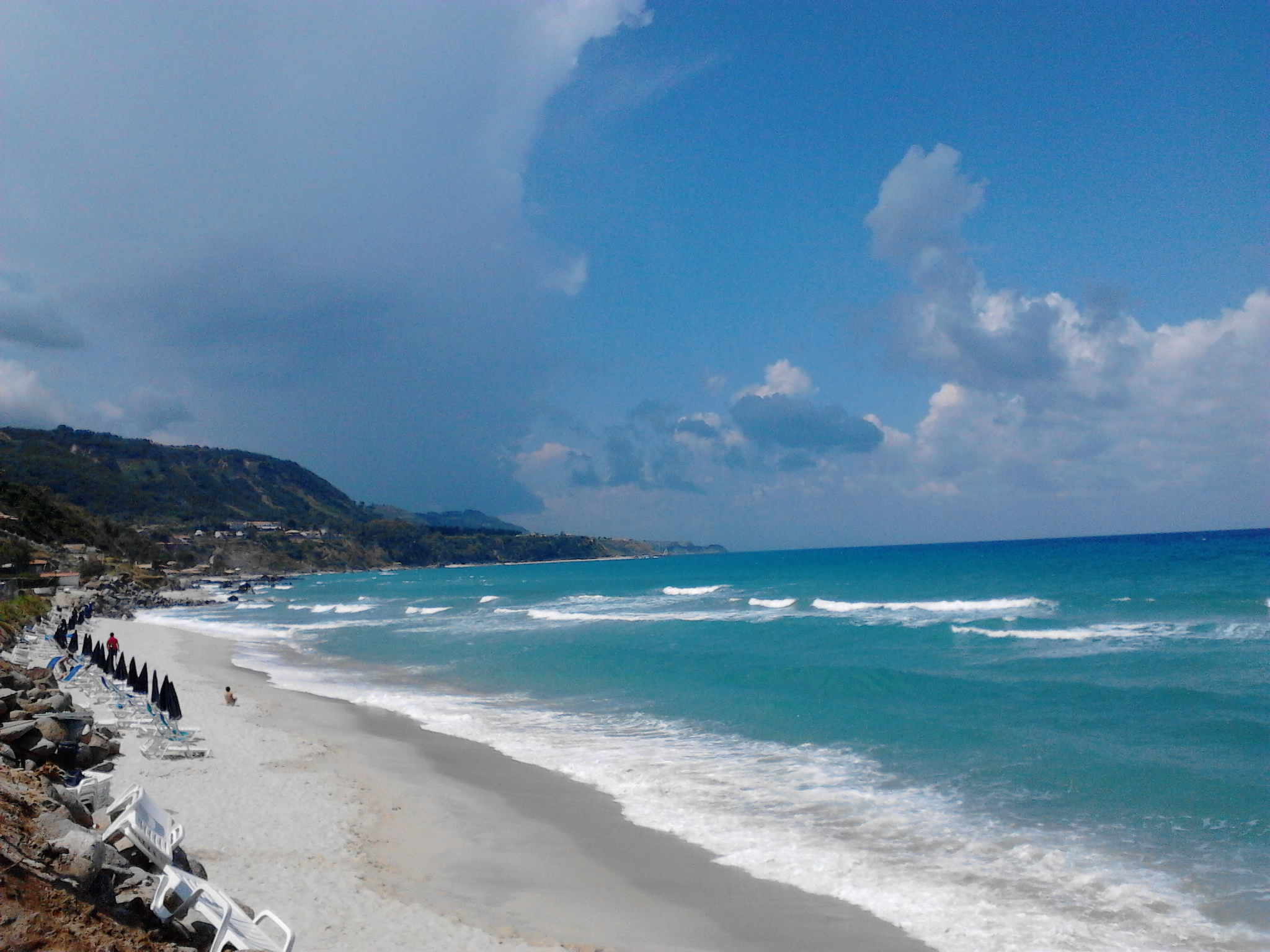
Parghelia

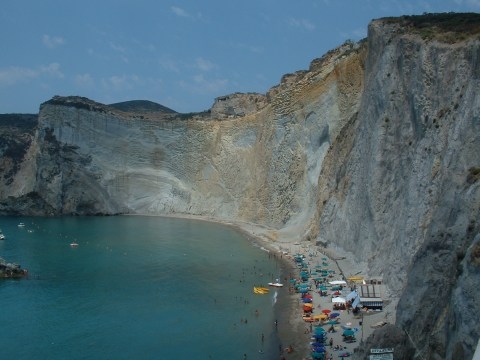
Ponza

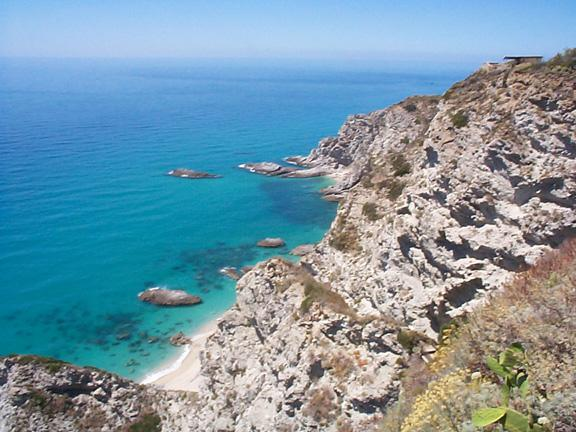
Capo Vaticano

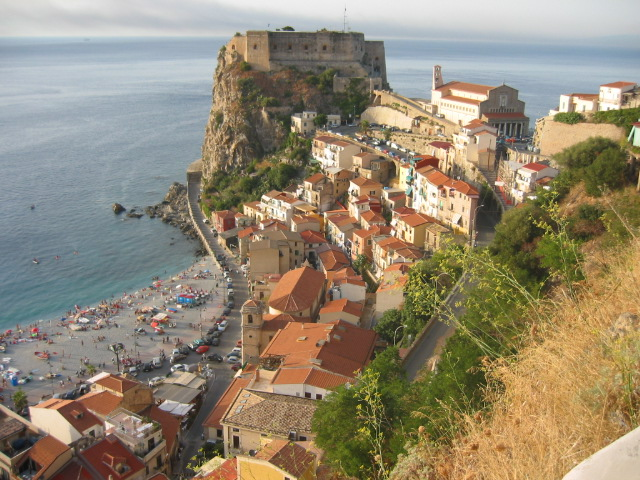
Scilla

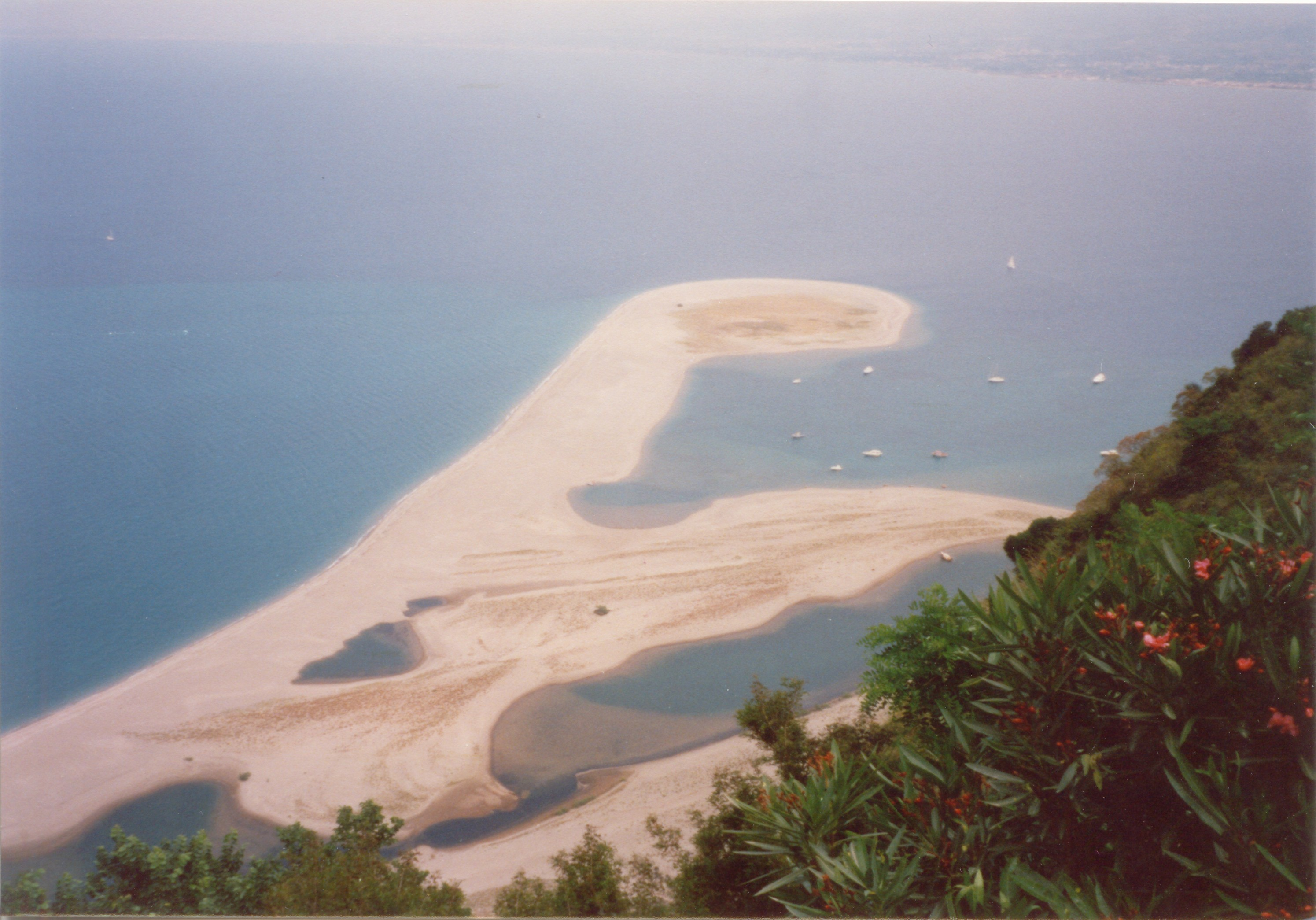
Tindari

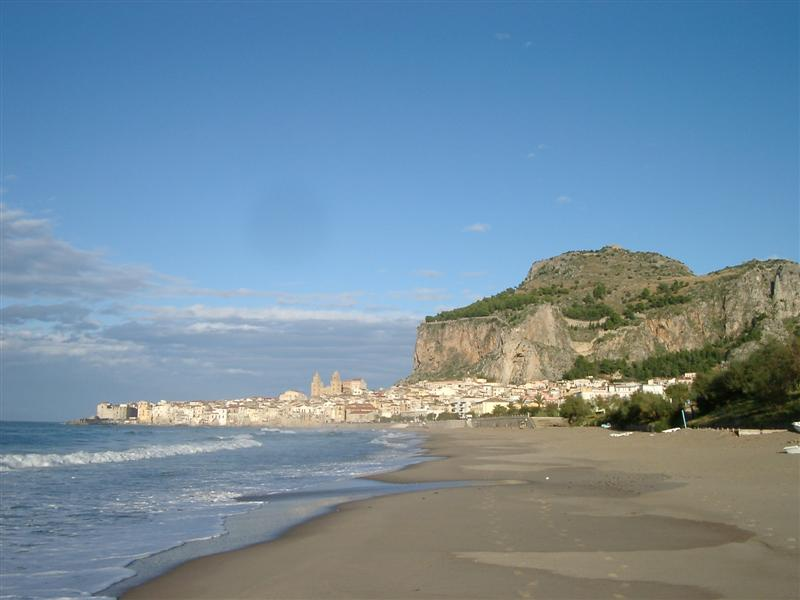
Cefalù

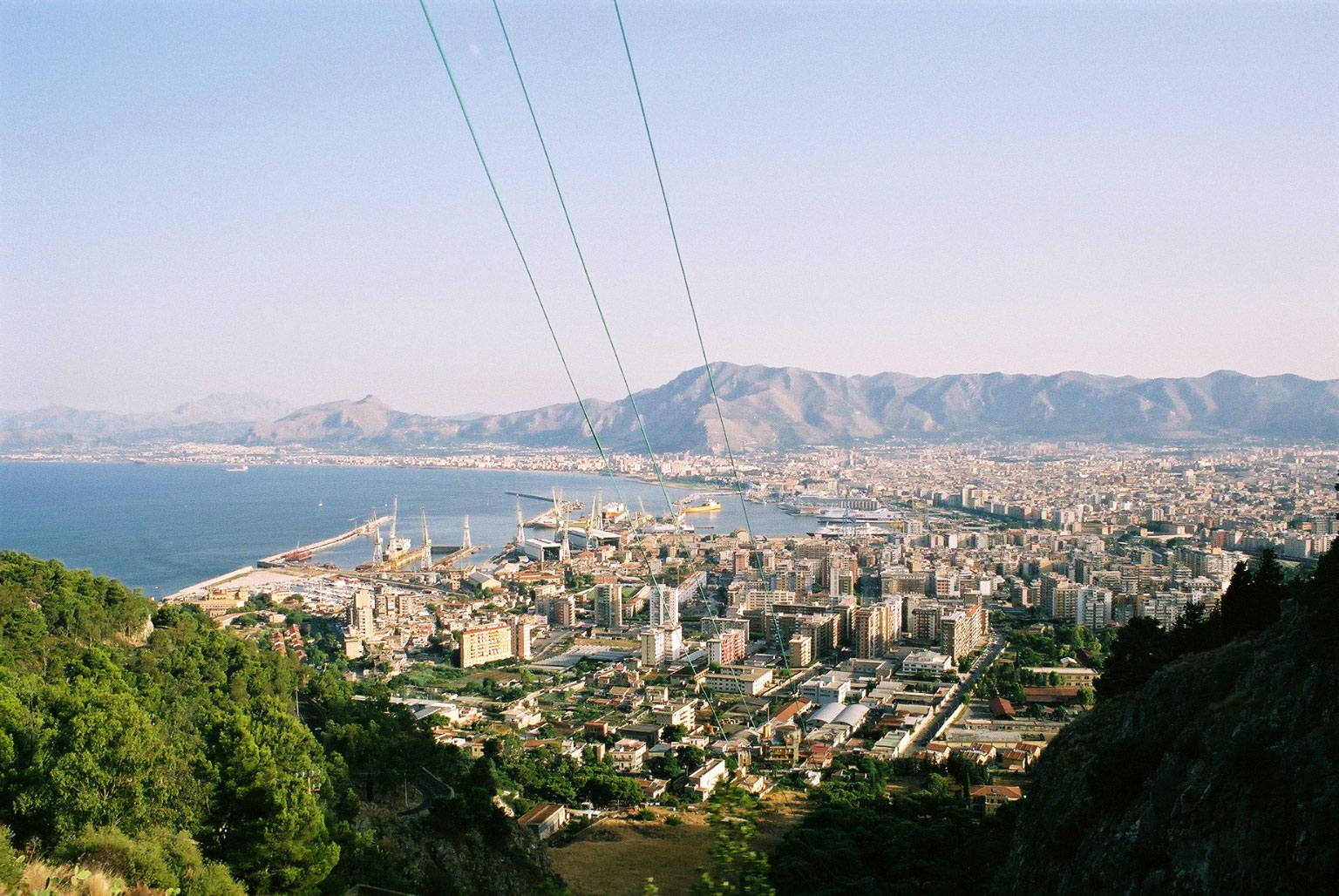
Palermo

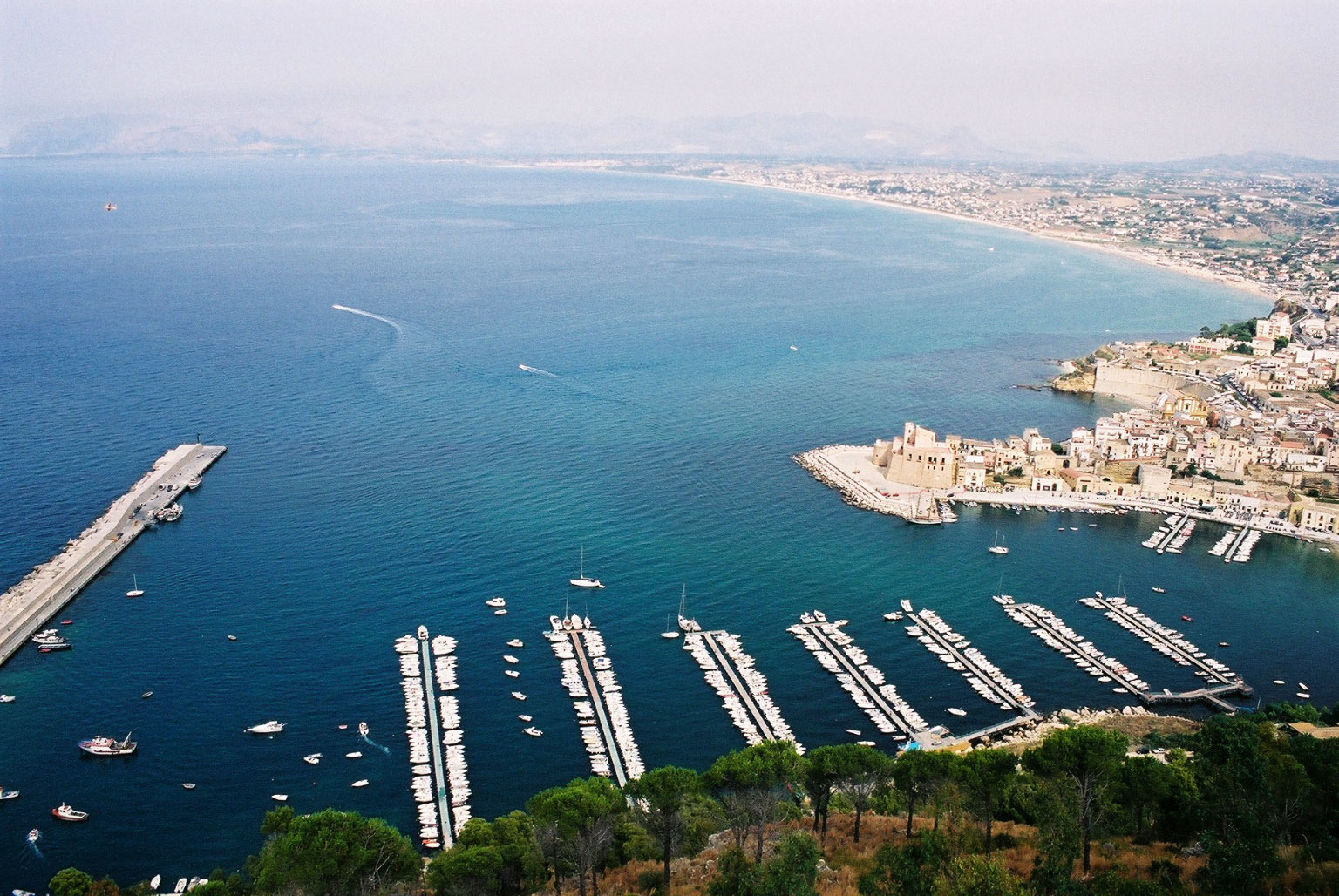
Castellammare del Golfo

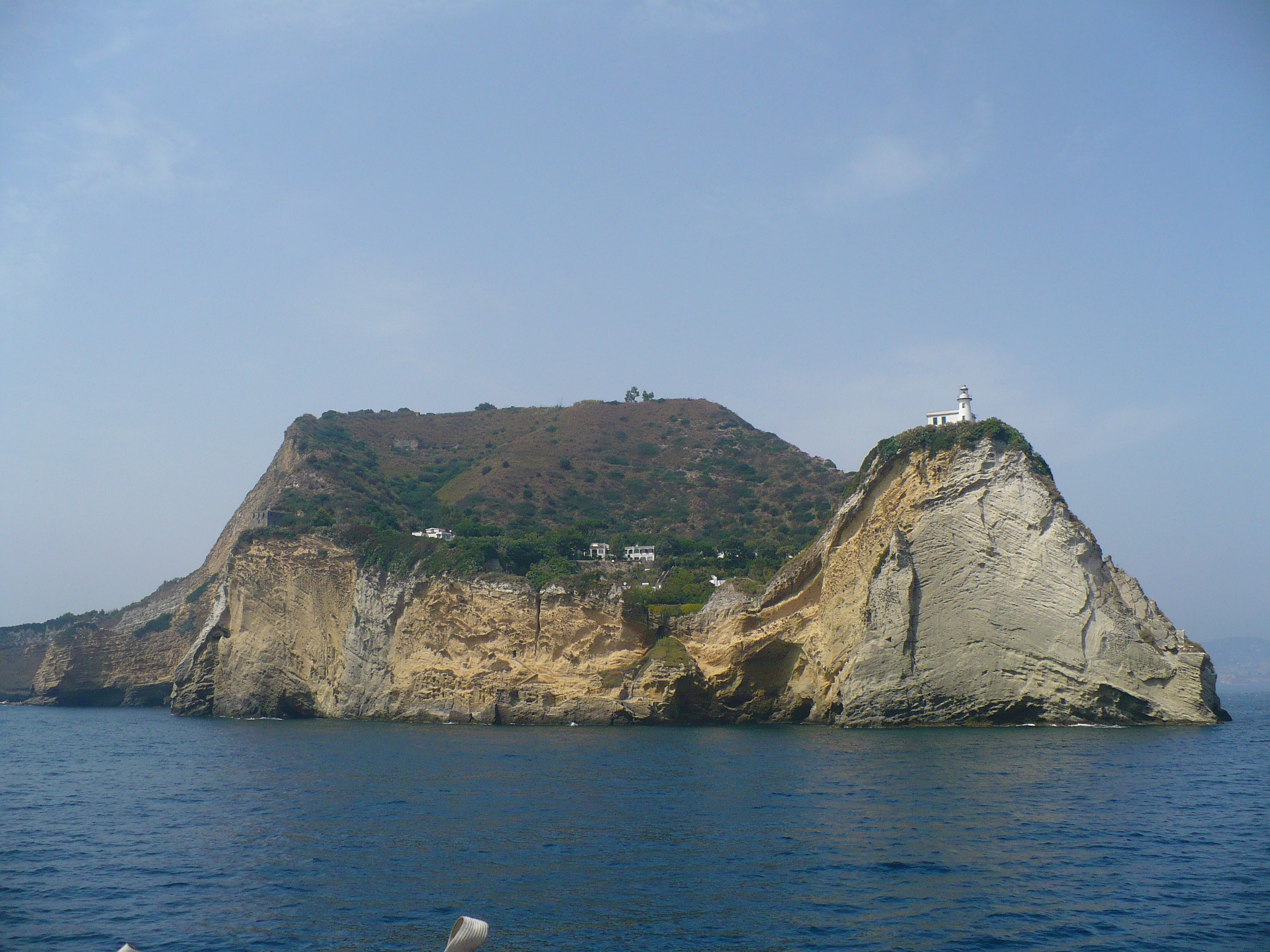
Capo Miseno

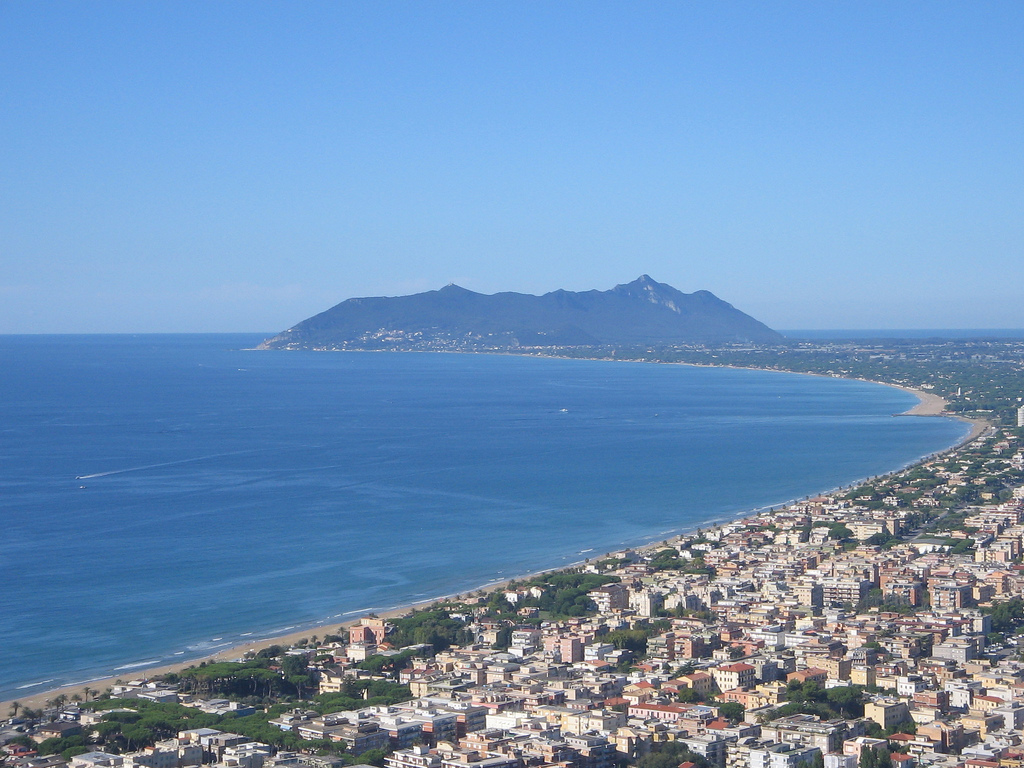
Terracina

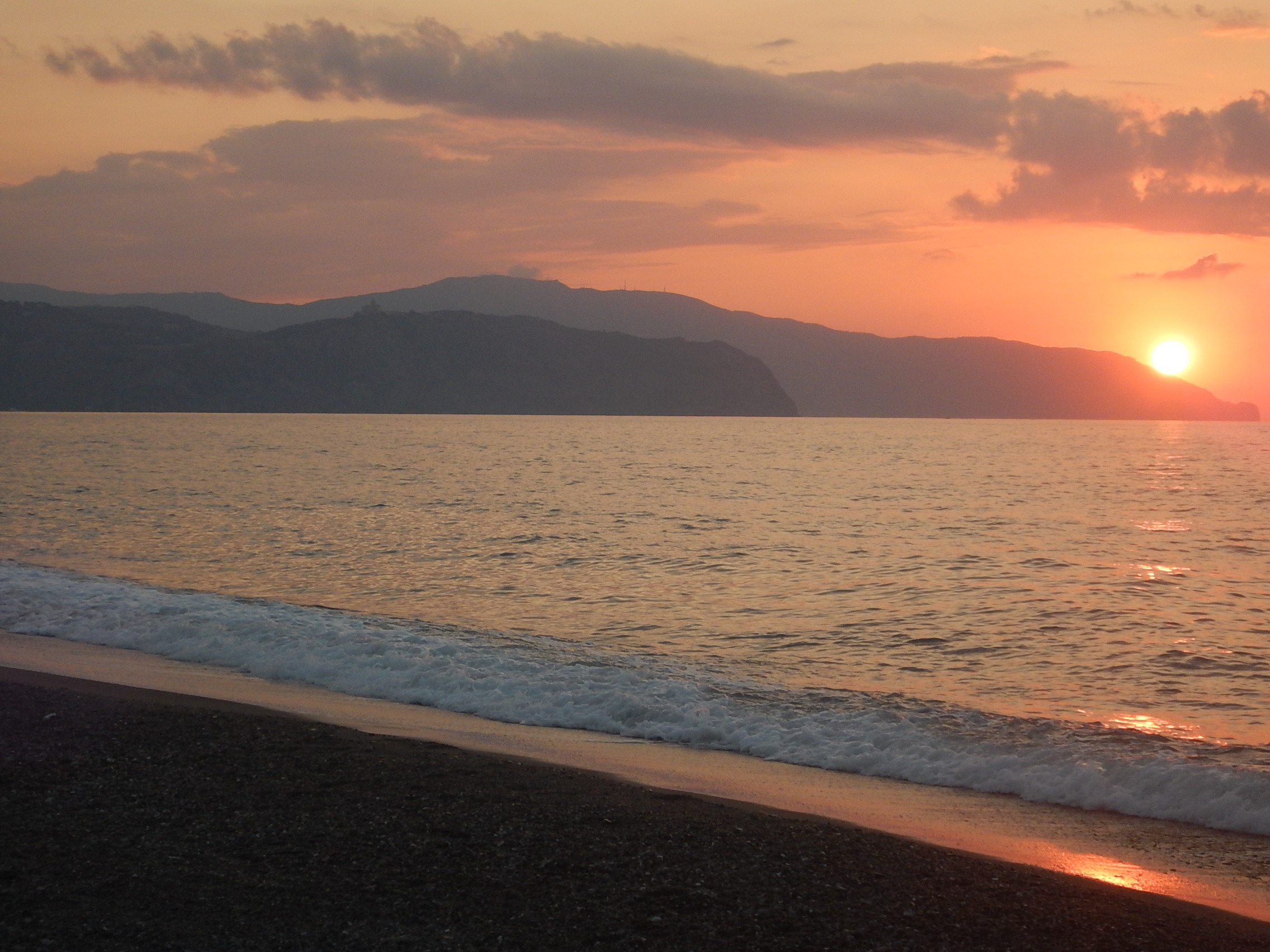
Terme Vigliatore

== See also ==
- Niceto
- Niceto Valley
