= Giannutri =

Italian island in the Tyrrhenian Sea

Coordinates: 42°15′N 11°06′E

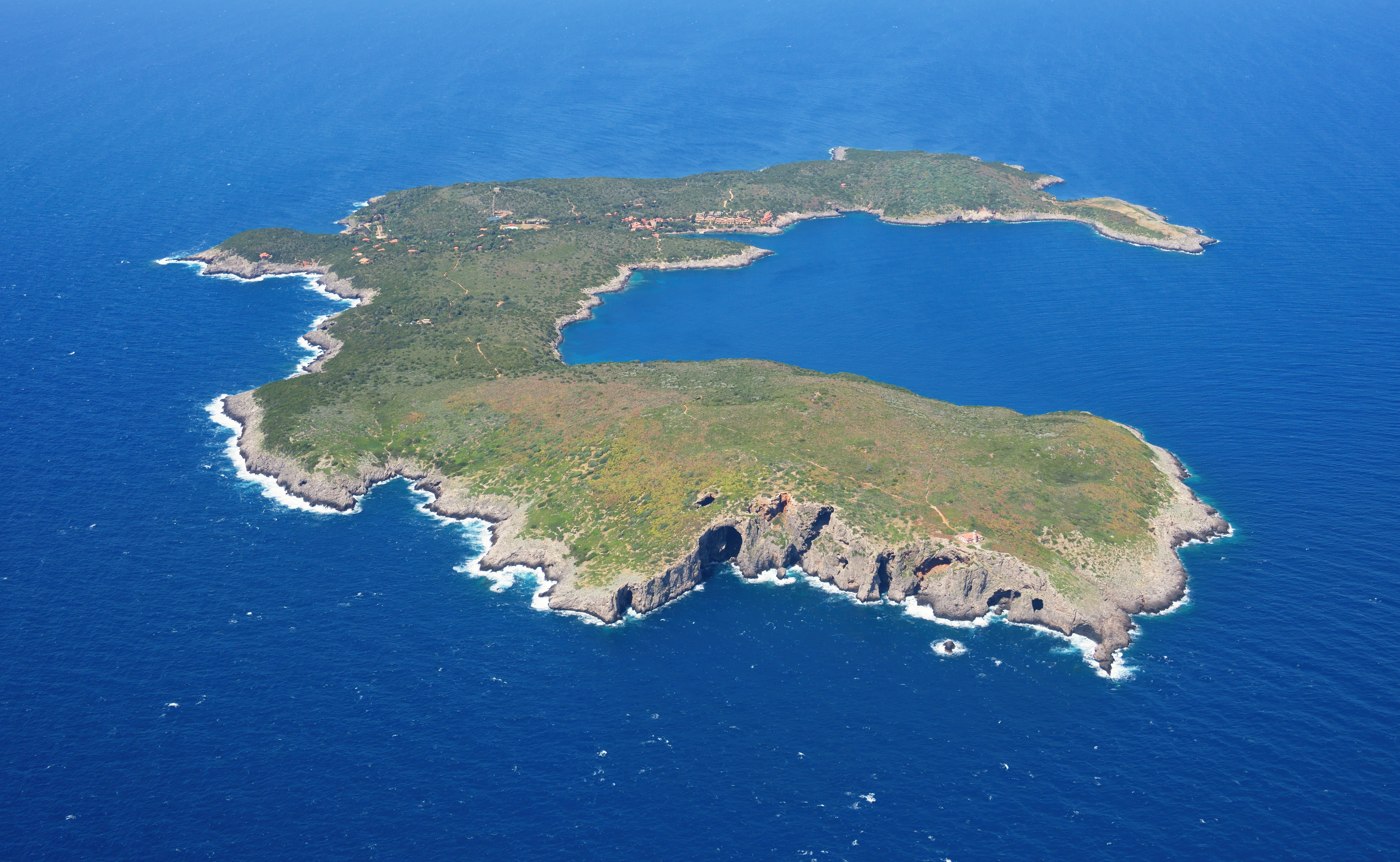
- Giannutri island seen from the air

Geography
- Location: Tyrrhenian Sea
- Archipelago: Tuscan Archipelago
- Total islands: 1
- Area: 2.6 km^{2} (1.0 sq mi)
- Length: 2.8 km (1.74 mi)
- Width: 0.5 km (0.31 mi)
- Highest elevation: 88 m (289 ft)
- Highest point: Poggio del Capel Rosso

Administration
- Italy
- Region: Tuscany
- Province: Grosseto (GR)
- Comune: Isola del Giglio

Demographics
- Population: 27 registered resident population (2011)

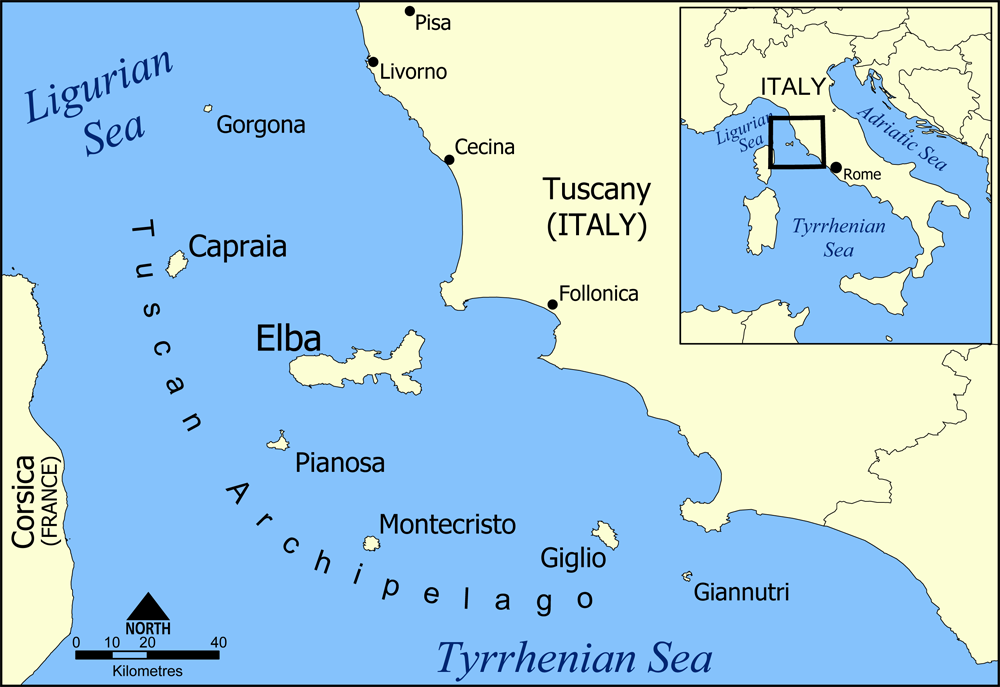
Map of the Tuscan Archipelago

Giannutri (Italian pronunciation: [dʒanˈnuːtri]) is a small island in the Tyrrhenian Sea off the coast of Tuscany, Italy; it is the southernmost island of the Tuscan Archipelago and it is a frazione of the comune of Isola del Giglio in the Province of Grosseto.

== Geography ==
Giannutri was known as Dianium by the Romans and Artemisia, Αρτεμησία by the Greeks; it has a crescent moon shape which forms the Gulf of Spalmatoio and is placed at 16 kilometres (9.9 mi) south east from the Isola del Giglio and 17.6 kilometres (10.9 mi) from Porto Ercole. The island has a coastal perimeter of 11 km (7 mi), is stretched approximately 2.8 km (2 mi) from Punta del Capo Rosso to Punta Secca (north-south) and 2 km (1 mi) from Punta San Francesco to Punta della Salvezza (west-east). The soil is calcareous and has a rocky and rugged coasts with inlets and caves mainly in the southern part interrupted only by two beaches called Cala dello Spalmatoio (on the north-east) and Cala Maestra (on the north-west) where the dockings are. The island landscape has three hills: Poggio del Cannone (83 m) and Monte Mario (78 m) in the northern part and Poggio Capel Rosso (93 m), the highest, in the south where the lighthouse is.

== Flora ==
The island’s flora is prevalently a high macchia mediterranea in the northern part which become garrigue in the southern. Plants as arbutus, Myrtus, pistacia lentiscus, mock privet, Mediterranean buckthorn, juniperus phoenicea and limonium sommierianum knew only on Isola del Giglio and Montecristo, grow up on the island. The mild climate has favoured the growth of plants such as euphorbia, palm trees and wild orchids. The marine flora is abundant in sponges, madreporaria, black coral and red coral.

== Fauna ==
The island, as all that of the Tuscan Archipelago, is a place where the bird migration take a stop along their seasonal movement from North to South. The Audouin's gull, Puffinus yelkouan, western black-eared wheatear, Marmora's warbler and European shag are common on the island.

== History ==
Giannutri was mentioned by Pliny the Elder in his Naturalis Historiae and by the Latin geographer Pomponio Mela in his "de Chorographia". The island was inhabited by Romans of which are the vestiges of a magnificent Roman villa reopened on 2 July 2015. Giannutri was abandoned for mysterious reasons from the 3rd century until 805 when Charlemagne donated to the Tre Fontane Abbey some lands, including the island which returned to be inhabited by cenobitic monks and some hermits.

In the following centuries the Island was assigned by emphyteusis to the Aldobrandeschi family of Sovana in 1269, to the Orsini of Pitigliano on June 15, 1410 and to Siena on August 12, 1452 by Pope Nicholas V award. The island changed several times of rule: Spanish, French and German and for sometimes became refuge of pirates and Saracens until the Treaty of Lunéville which assigned Giannutri to the Kingdom of Etruria in 1801, afterward to the Grand Duchy of Tuscany till the Italian unification in 1861.

In 1806 a small military garrison was sent on the island. On 10 May 1809, a landing party from HMS Seahorse and HMS Halcyon landed on the Pianosa and Giannutri. The landing party destroyed the enemy forts and captured about 100 prisoners during four hours of fighting. British losses were one marine killed and one wounded.

The Minister of Finances Quintino Sella, with a Royal decree, donated the island to the Comune of Giglio in 1865 in order to settle a farm.

In 1908 the Comune sold the island to the family Ruffo della Scaletta which remained the owner until the death of the Prince Rufo. In the 1960s and 1970s the real estate investing transformed radically the island; in a few years a holiday resort at Cala Spalmatoio and many houses scattered through the island were built. The Società Porto Romano declared bankruptcy and the numerous owners of the houses were obliged to form a society, called Libero Consorzio Giannutri, in order to administer the island.

== Roman villa ==
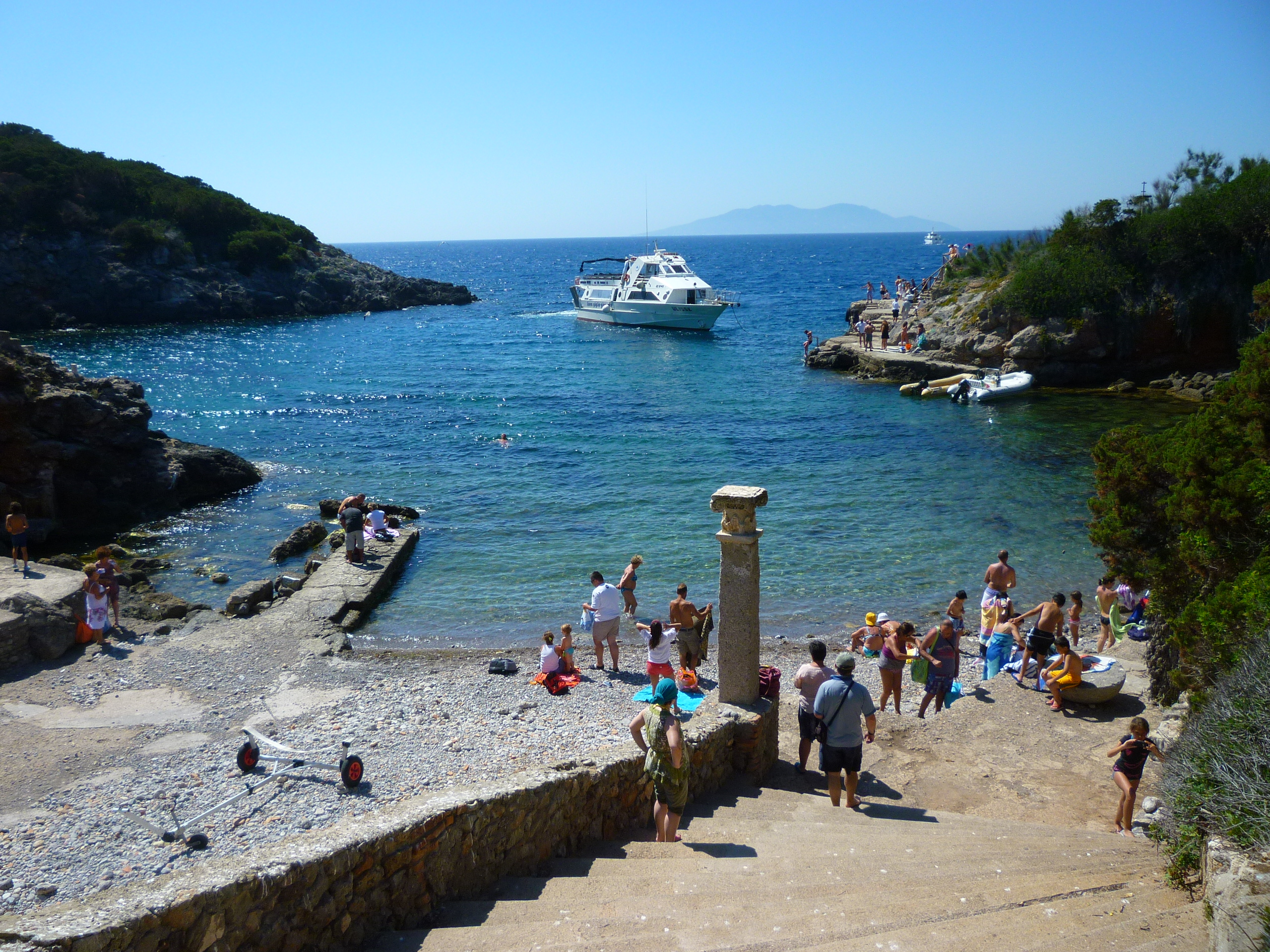
Cala Maestra

Villa Domizia, also known as Villa Domitia was built probably in the 1st or 2nd century by the Gnaeus Domitius Ahenobarbus who was the owner of the island. The Villa is placed in the central part of the island on a height, close to Punta Scaletta and Cala Maestra; the Villa and its annexes are under the control of Italy’s Ministry of Cultural Heritage. The rooms employed as residence and the others were disposed on the highest level accessible by stairs; on the same level was a terrace from which to watch the Argentario coast. In the back of the residential quarter are the remains of a long building, with 8 rooms aligned, likely used by the monks as convent and since then called Conventaccio.

The Villa is connected to Cala Maestra through a set of stairs. The Calidarium, formed by a rectangular room from whose walls passed the warm air, was placed halfway between the Villa and Cala Maestra and was richly adorned with marbles and mosaic floor. The Romans built a small harbour and a wharf at Cala Maestra cutting the rock in order to have more space. The Villa was provided with a cistern to collect the rain water since the island is lack of springs; the water produced today by a desalination plant is collected in the same cistern. In the 1980s a short, grassy airstrip was built and used for a short time at Punta San Francesco, later was abandoned.

== National park ==
The island and adjacent sea environs are within the Arcipelago Toscano National Park and marine sanctuary. The island is mainly privately owned, with some areas owned by Italy’s Ministry of the Environment it is involved in the Coastal Area Management Programme issued by Ministry of the Environment.

== See also ==
- List of islands of Italy
- Tuscan Archipelago

== Gallery ==
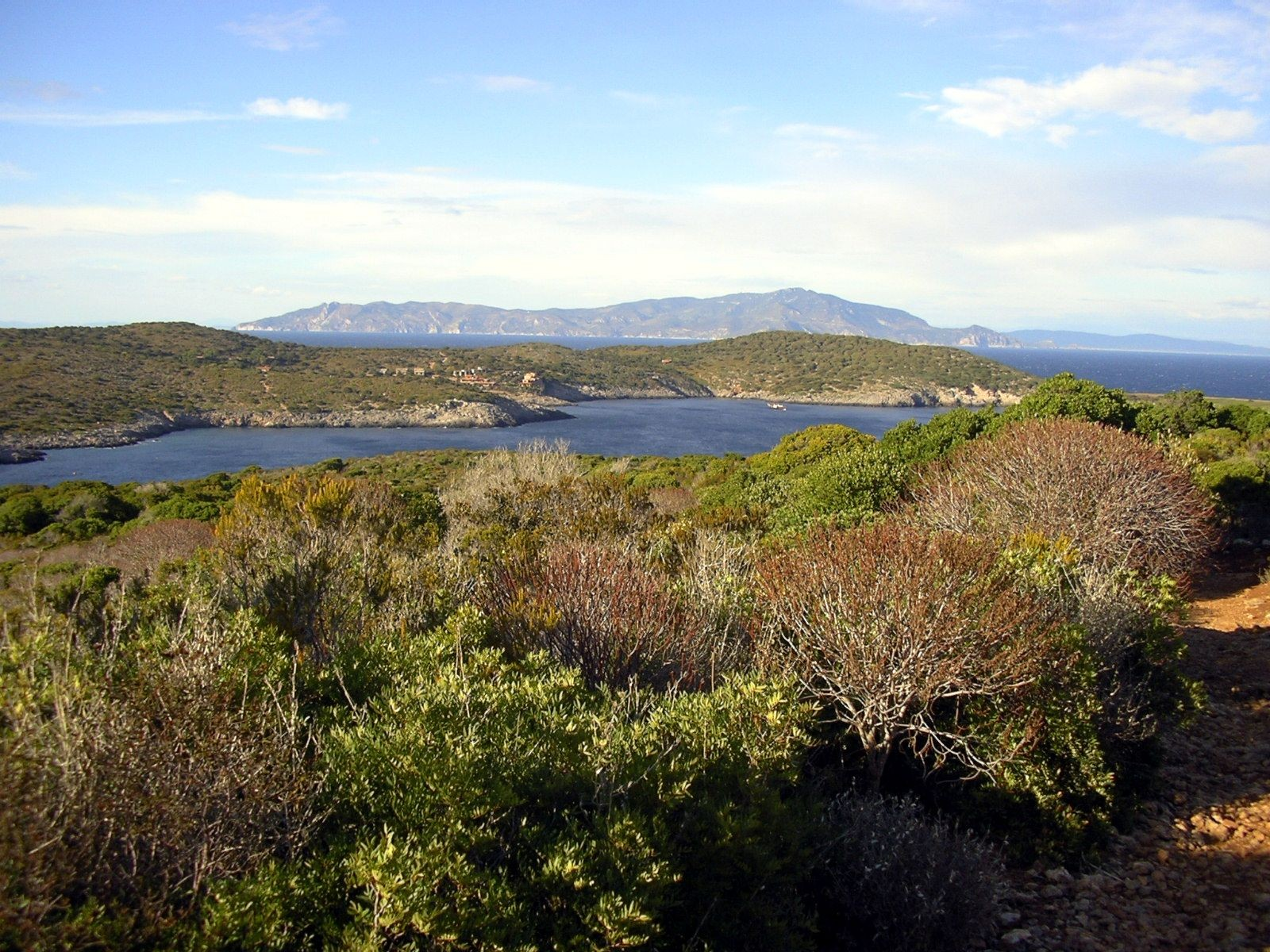
Giannutri Spalmatoio gulf with Monte Argentario

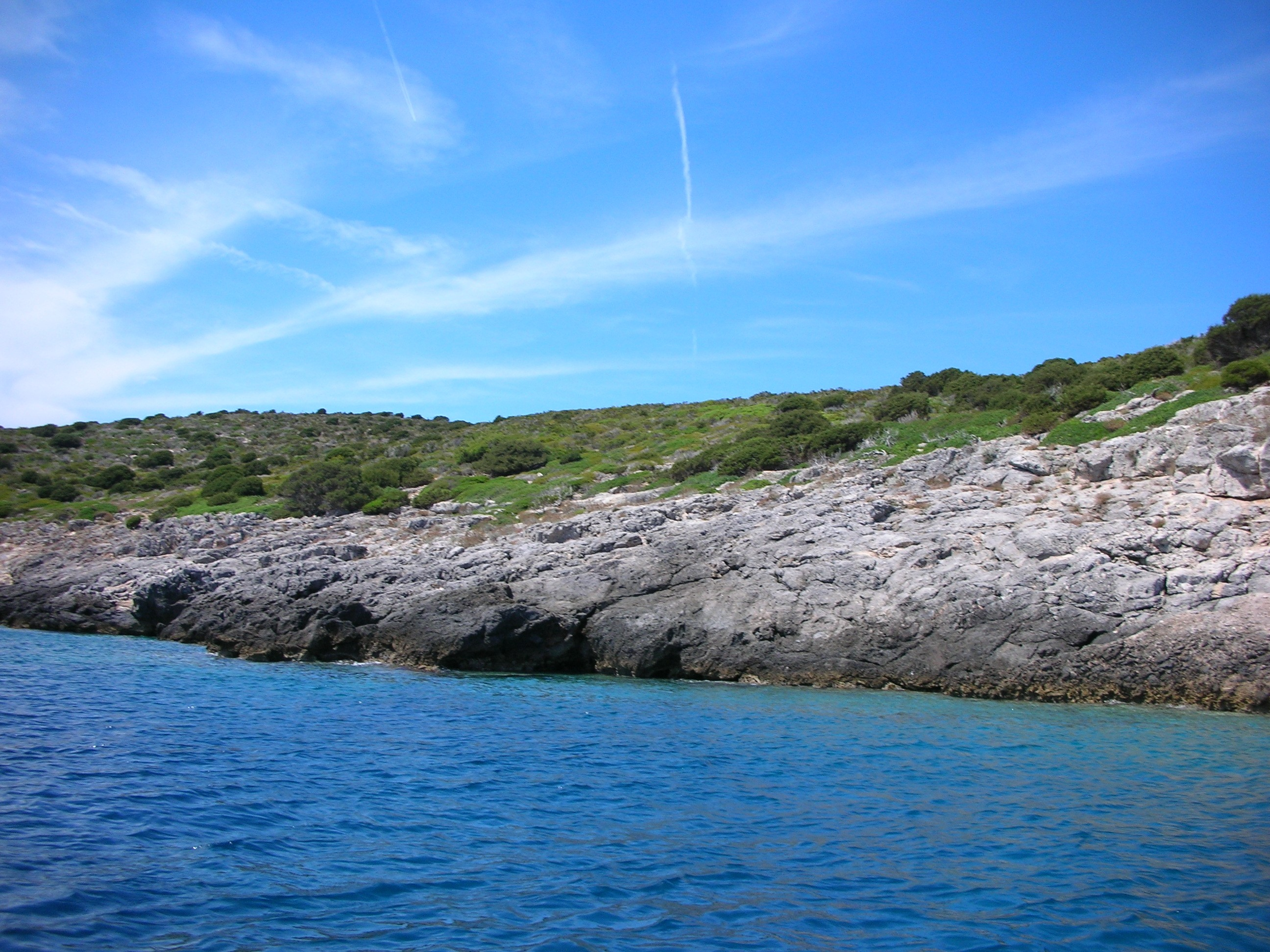
The coast of Giannutri

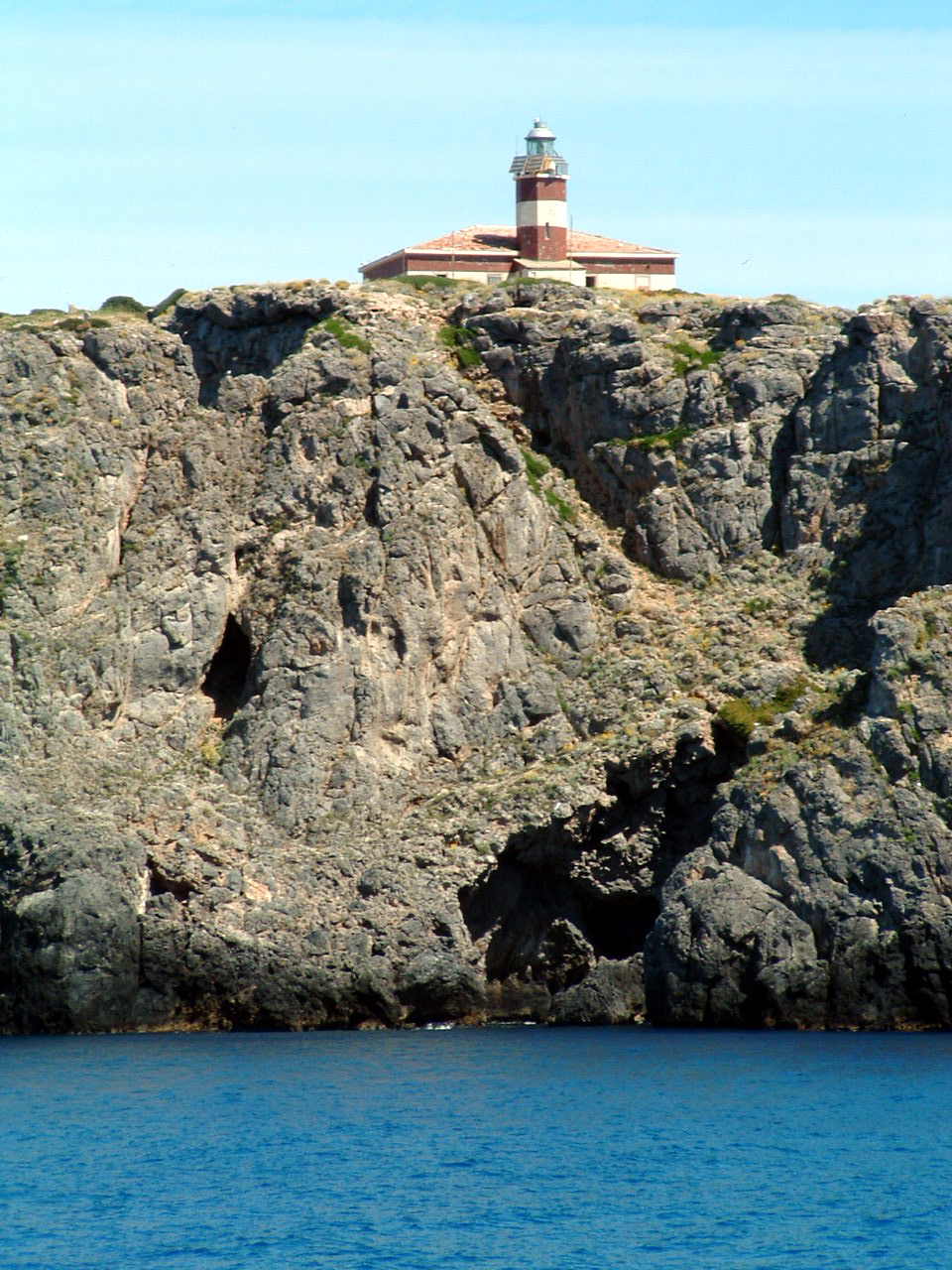
Giannutri's lighthouse

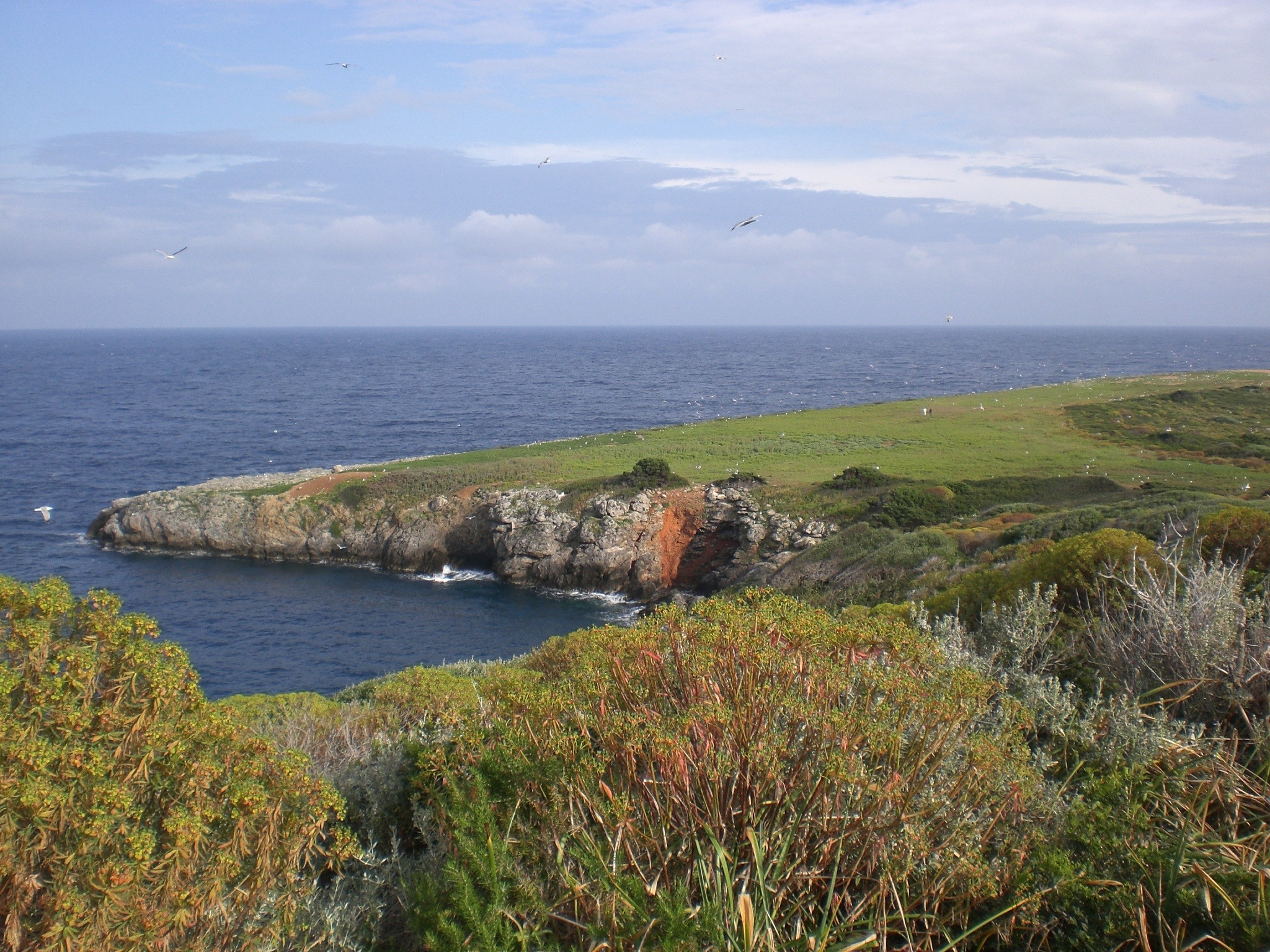
Giannutri's disused runway
