= List of twin towns and sister cities in Malta =

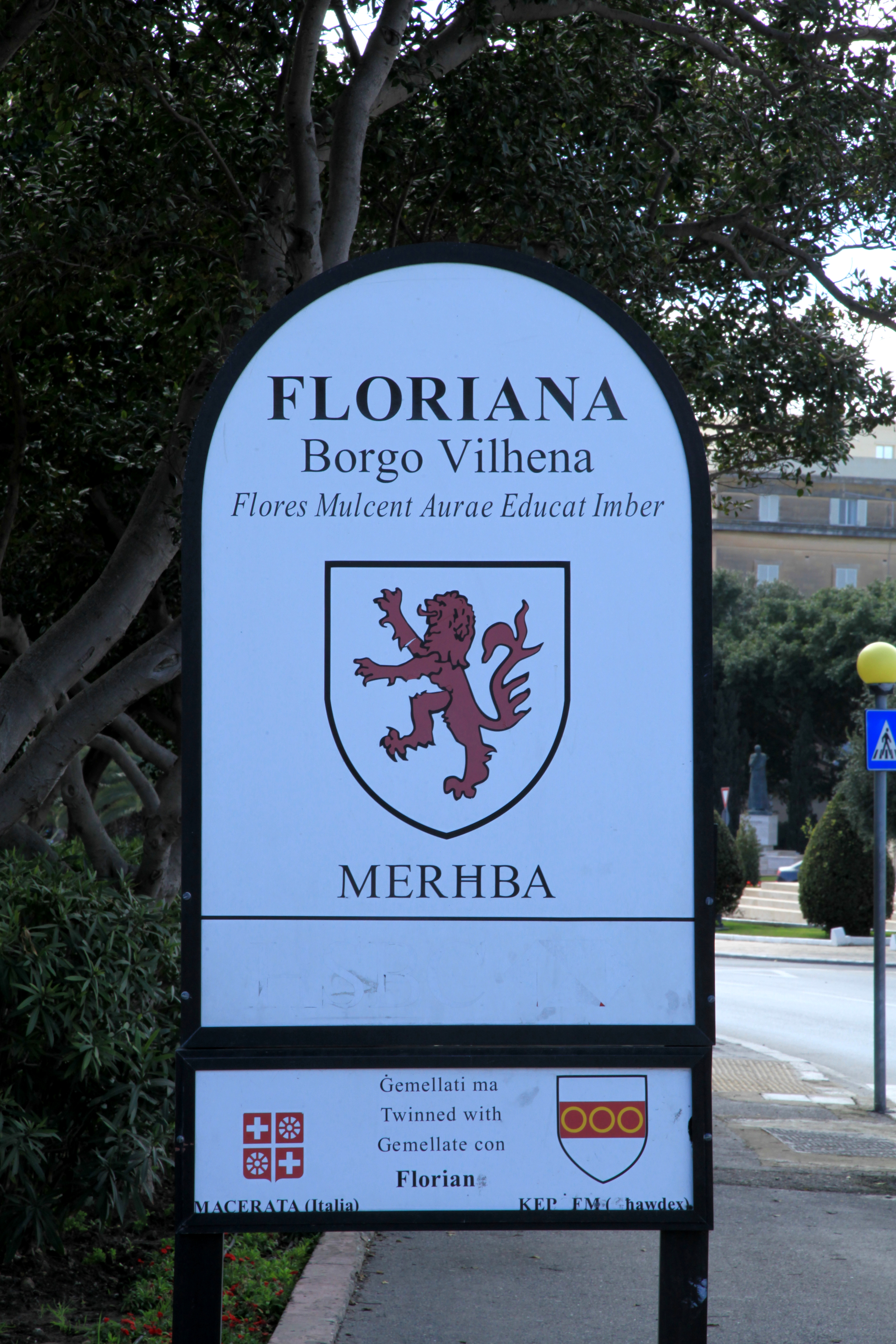
Floriana twin town sign

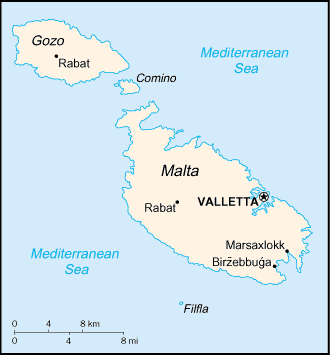
Map of Malta

This is a list of local councils of Malta which have standing links to local communities in other countries known as "town twinning" (usually in Europe) or "sister cities" (usually in the rest of the world).

== A ==
Attard

- Élancourt, France
- Pieve Emanuele, Italy

== B ==
Birkirkara

- Grosseto, Italy

Birgu

- Belvì, Italy
- Saint-Tropez, France

== F ==
Floriana

- Macerata, Italy

== G ==
Għajnsielem

- Bethlehem, Palestine
- Tolfa, Italy

Għarb

- Castrolibero, Italy
- Massafra, Italy
- Torrent, Spain
- Tortona, Italy

Għasri

- Ottenschlag, Austria

Gżira

- Wałbrzych, Poland

== H ==
Hamrun

- Scilla, Italy

== K ==
Kalkara

- Crespellano (Valsamoggia), Italy

Kirkop

- Rousset, France

== M ==
Marsa

- Bridgwater, England, United Kingdom

Marsaskala is a member of the Douzelage, a town twinning association of towns across the European Union, alongside with:

- Agros, Cyprus
- Altea, Spain
- Asikkala, Finland
- Bad Kötzting, Germany
- Bellagio, Italy
- (Republic of Ireland) Bundoran, Ireland
- Chojna, Poland
- Granville, France
- Holstebro, Denmark
- Houffalize, Belgium
- Judenburg, Austria
- Kőszeg, Hungary
- Meerssen, Netherlands
- Niederanven, Luxembourg
- Oxelösund, Sweden
- Preveza, Greece
- Rokiškis, Lithuania
- Rovinj, Croatia
- Sesimbra, Portugal
- Sherborne, England, United Kingdom
- Sigulda, Latvia
- Siret, Romania
- Škofja Loka, Slovenia
- Sušice, Czech Republic
- Tryavna, Bulgaria
- Türi, Estonia
- Zvolen, Slovakia

Marsaxlokk

- Cadeo, Italy

Mdina

- Zaragoza, Spain

Mellieħa

- Adenau, Germany
- Ayia Napa, Cyprus
- Cavriglia, Italy

Mġarr

- Mathi, Italy

Mosta

- Millbrae, United States
- Ragusa, Italy

Munxar

- Ragalna, Italy

== N ==
Nadur is a member of the Charter of European Rural Communities, a town twinning association across the European Union. Nadur also has two other twin towns.

Charter of European Rural Communities

- Bienvenida, Spain
- Bièvre, Belgium
- Bucine, Italy
- (Republic of Ireland) Cashel, Ireland
- Cissé, France
- Desborough, England, United Kingdom
- Esch (Haaren), Netherlands
- Hepstedt, Germany
- Ibănești, Romania
- Kandava (Tukums), Latvia
- Kannus, Finland
- Kolindros, Greece
- Lassee, Austria
- Medzev, Slovakia
- Næstved, Denmark
- Nagycenk, Hungary
- Ockelbo, Sweden
- Pano Lefkara, Cyprus
- Põlva, Estonia
- Samuel (Soure), Portugal
- Starý Poddvorov, Czech Republic
- Strzyżów, Poland
- Svoge, Bulgaria
- Tisno, Croatia
- Troisvierges, Luxembourg
- Žagarė (Joniškis), Lithuania

Other

- Baveno, Italy
- Cicciano, Italy

Naxxar

- Baveno, Italy
- Cicciano, Italy

== P ==
Paola

- Calcinaia, Italy

Pembroke

- Pembroke, Wales, United Kingdom
- Pembroke Dock, Wales, United Kingdom
- Roccalumera, Italy

== Q ==
Qala

- Malfa, Italy
- Lanciano, Italy
- Leni, Italy
- Santa Marina Salina, Italy

== R ==
Rabat

- Tarquinia, Italy

== S ==
Saint Paul's Bay

- Agios Pavlos, Greece

San Ġwann

- Monreale, Italy

San Lawrenz

- Colle Umberto, Italy

Sannat

- Pisoniano, Italy

Santa Luċija

- Carlentini, Italy
- Gabiano, Italy
- Gusu (Suzhou), China

Santa Venera

- Orvieto, Italy

Senglea

- Cassino, Italy
- Zarasai, Lithuania

Siġġiewi

- Vittoria, Italy

Sliema

- Białystok, Poland
- Hartlepool, England, United Kingdom

Swieqi

- Taormina, Italy

== T ==
Tarxien

- Veliko Tarnovo, Bulgaria

== V ==
Valletta

- Cortona, Italy
- Palermo, Italy
- Piran, Slovenia
- Pisa, Italy
- Rhodes, Greece

Victoria

- Nichelino, Italy

== X ==
Xagħra

- Chevaigné, France
- Cisano Bergamasco, Italy
- Kunszentmiklós, Hungary
- Offida, Italy

Xewkija

- Castelvenere, Italy
- Modica, Italy
- Pachino, Italy

Xgħajra

- Colletorto, Italy
- Pelplin, Poland

== Z ==
Żabbar

- Eschborn, Germany
- Villabate, Italy

Żebbuġ

- Agira, Italy

Żebbuġ, Gozo

- Maletto, Italy

Żejtun

- Celano, Italy
- Tocina, Spain

Żurrieq

- Angermünde, Germany
- Borgo Maggiore, San Marino
- Morphou, Cyprus
