= Punta Lingua Lighthouse =

Lighthouse in Salina, Italy

Punta Lingua
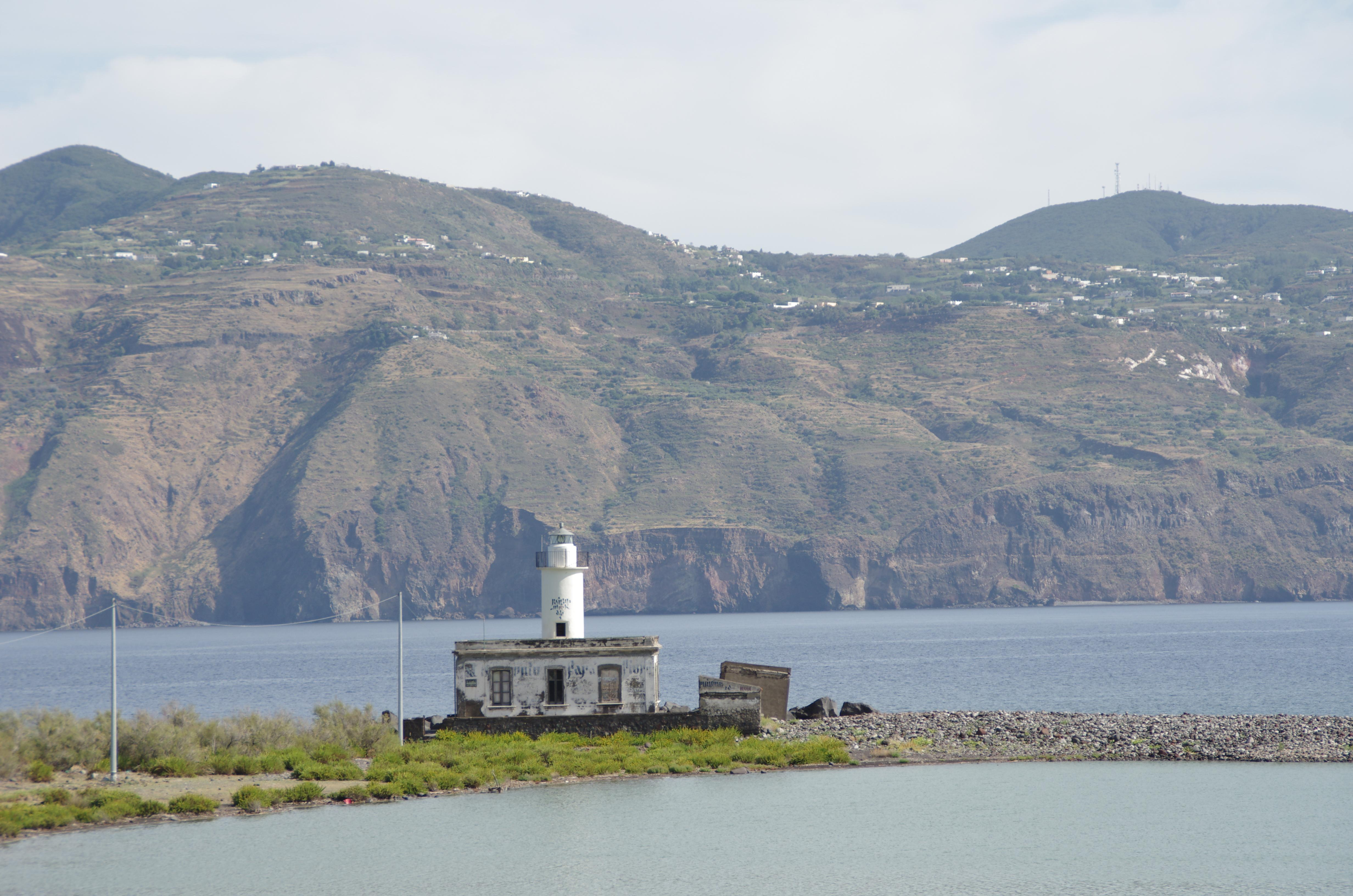
- Punta Lingua Lighthouse
- Location: Santa Marina Salina; Aeolian Islands; Sicily; Italy
- Coordinates: 38°32′14″N 14°52′16″E

Tower
- Constructed: 1953
- Foundation: concrete base
- Construction: masonry tower
- Height: 11 metres (36 ft)
- Shape: cylindrical tower with balcony and lantern adjacent to the keeper's house
- Markings: white tower and lantern, grey metallic lantern dome
- Power source: mains electricity
- Operator: Marina Militare

Light
- Focal height: 13 metres (43 ft)
- Lens: Type TD
- Intensity: LABI 100 W
- Range: 11 nautical miles (20 km; 13 mi)
- Characteristic: Fl W 3s.
- Italy no.: 3300 E.F.

Punta Lingua Lighthouse (Italian: Faro di Punta Lingua) is an active lighthouse located on the south eastern tip of the island of Salina, which makes part of the Aeolian Islands, in the municipality of Santa Marina Salina on the Tyrrhenian Sea.

== History ==
The lighthouse, built in 1953, over the years went into ruin and in November 2009, due to a violent storm, the balcony collapsed and the area was closed. In 2011 the municipality concluded an agreement, with the Agenzia del Demanio, to obtain the management of the keeper's house, which has been restored in order to house the Museum of the Sea.

== Description ==
The lighthouse consists of a cylindrical tower, 11 metres (36 ft) high, with balcony and lantern beside a 1-storey keeper's house. The tower, the building and the lantern are white, the lantern dome is grey metallic. The light is positioned at 13 metres (43 ft) above sea level and emits one white flash in a 3 seconds period visible up to a distance of 11 nautical miles (20 km; 13 mi). The lighthouse is completely automated and managed by the Marina Militare with the identification code number 3300 E.F.

== See also ==
- List of lighthouses in Italy
- Santa Marina Salina
