= Nino Randazzo =

Italian-Australian journalist and politician (1932–2019)

Nino Randazzo (22 July 1932 – 10 July 2019) was an Italian-Australian journalist and politician. He arrived in Australia as a young man and for 30 years served as the editor of Il Globo, one of the country's largest non-English newspapers. In 2006, he was elected to the Italian Senate as an overseas candidate.

== Biography ==
Born in Leni, in the Aeolian Islands, and emigrated to Australia in 1952. As a young man in Melbourne he was a member of the anti-communist Democratic Labor Party (DLP), and was a parliamentary candidate for the DLP in 1964. He was later editor of the Melbourne Italian-language daily newspaper Il Globo for 30 years.

Randazzo was elected to the Italian Senate in the 2006 Italian general elections, as an overseas candidate for the centre-left coalition L'Unione (The Union). He was on the same ticket as Marco Fedi, who was elected to the Italian Chamber of Deputies.

In December 2007, investigators into the case of alleged attempts by Silvio Berlusconi to influence RAI stumbled upon evidence that Berlusconi had tried to corrupt Randazzo to cease his support for Prodi's government.
