= Leni, Sicily =

Leni Lenós (Greek)
- Comune
- Comune di Leni
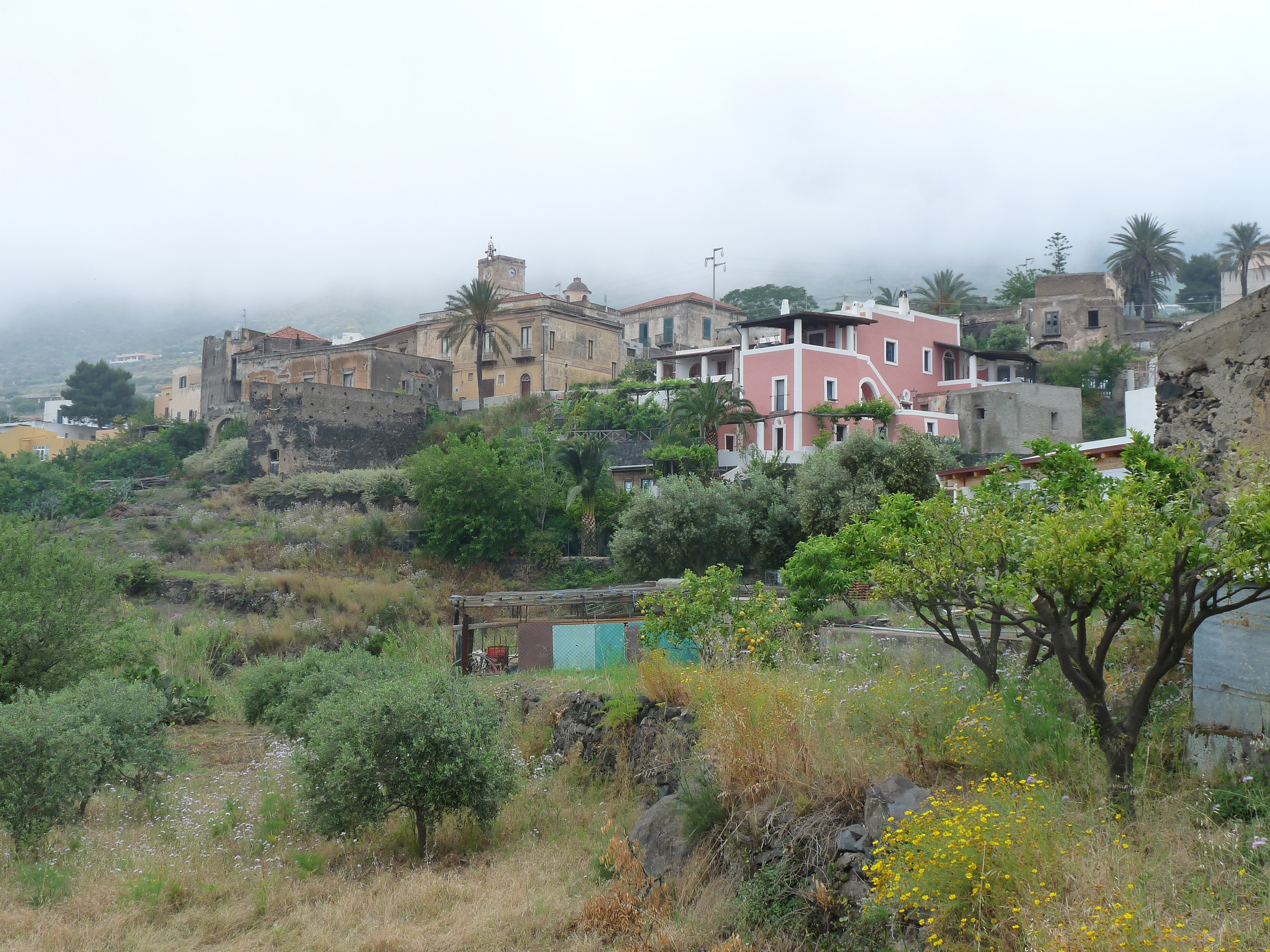
- View of Leni

- Coat of arms

- Location within Italy Location within Sicily
- Coordinates: 38°33′N 14°50′E
- Country: Italy
- Region: Sicily
- Metropolitan city: Messina (ME)
- Frazioni: Rinella, Valdichiesa

Government
  - Mayor: Giacomo Montecristo

Area
  - Total: 8.79 km^{2} (3.39 sq mi)
- Elevation: 202 m (663 ft)

Population (2026)
  - Total: 669
  - Density: 76.1/km^{2} (197/sq mi)
- Demonym: Lenesi
- Time zone: UTC+1 (CET)
  - Summer (DST): UTC+2 (CEST)
- Postal code: 98050
- Dialing code: 090
- Website: Official website

Leni is a comune (municipality) and one of the main villages on Salina, one of the Aeolian Islands, in the Metropolitan City of Messina in the autonomous island region of Sicily in southern Italy. It is located about 140 kilometres (87 mi) northeast of Palermo and about 70 kilometres (43 mi) northwest of Messina. It has 669 inhabitants.

Leni lies on the slope of the hill on the south of the island, 200 metres (660 ft) above the sea, between the volcanoes of Monte Fossa and Monte dei Porri.

Leni borders the municipalities of Malfa and Santa Marina Salina.

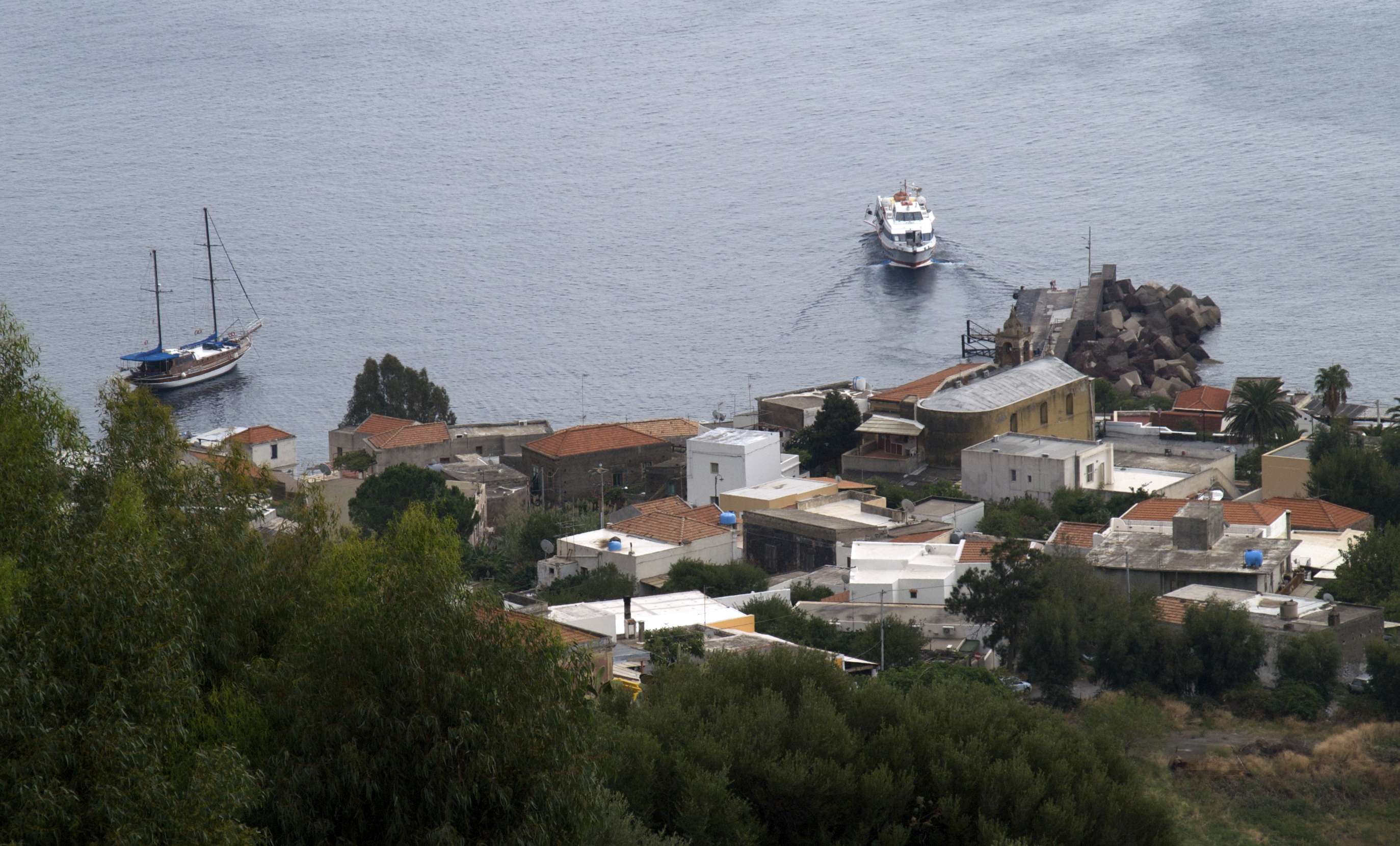
Rinella, port of Leni

== Demographics ==
As of 2026, the population is 669, of which 51.1% are male, and 48.9% are female. Minors make up 12.0% of the population, and seniors make up 29.6%.

Historical population

Year	Pop.	±%
1861	1,671	—
1871	1,327	−20.6%
1881	1,574	+18.6%
1901	1,311	−16.7%
1911	1,261	−3.8%
1921	1,036	−17.8%
1931	936	−9.7%
1936	891	−4.8%

Year	Pop.	±%
1951	779	−12.6%
1961	746	−4.2%
1971	672	−9.9%
1981	652	−3.0%
1991	682	+4.6%
2001	641	−6.0%
2011	702	+9.5%
2021	681	−3.0%

Source: ISTAT

=== Immigration ===
As of 2025, immigrants make up 10.9% of the population. The 5 largest foreign countries of birth are Morocco, Romania, France, Australia, and Germany.

== Notable people ==
- Nino Randazzo (born 1932)

== Twin towns - sister cities ==
- (Italy) Ischia, since 2013
