= Basiluzzo =

- Island
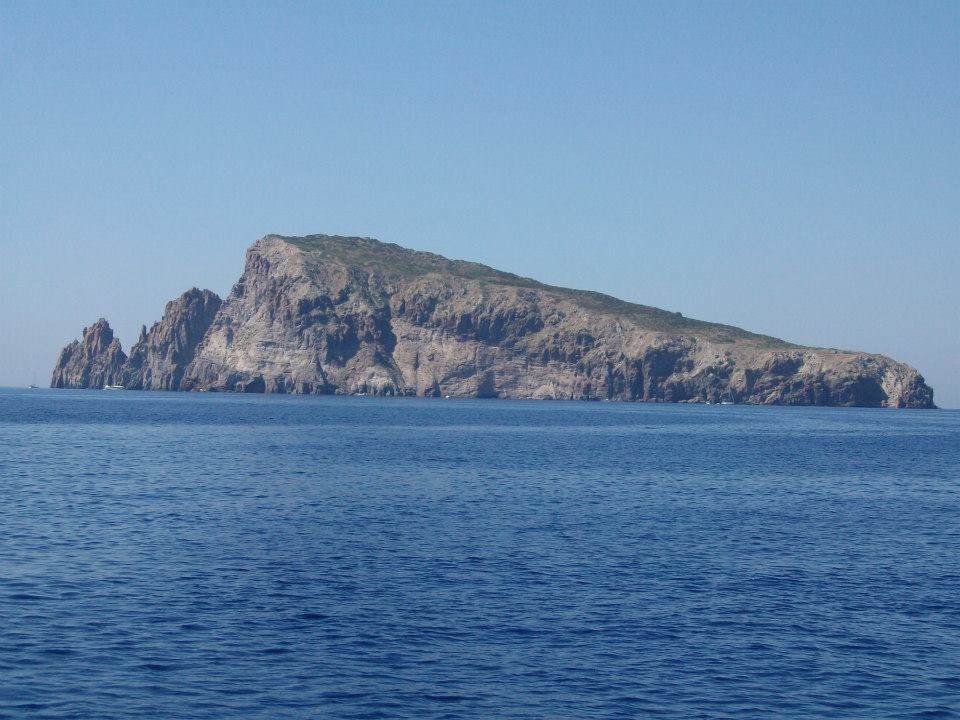
- Basiluzzo

- Location in Italy
- Coordinates: 38°39′48″N 15°06′50″E
- Country: Italy
- Province: Messina
- Comune: Lipari

Area
  - Total: 1 km^{2} (0.39 sq mi)

Population
  - Total: 0
  - Density: 0.0/km^{2} (0.0/sq mi)

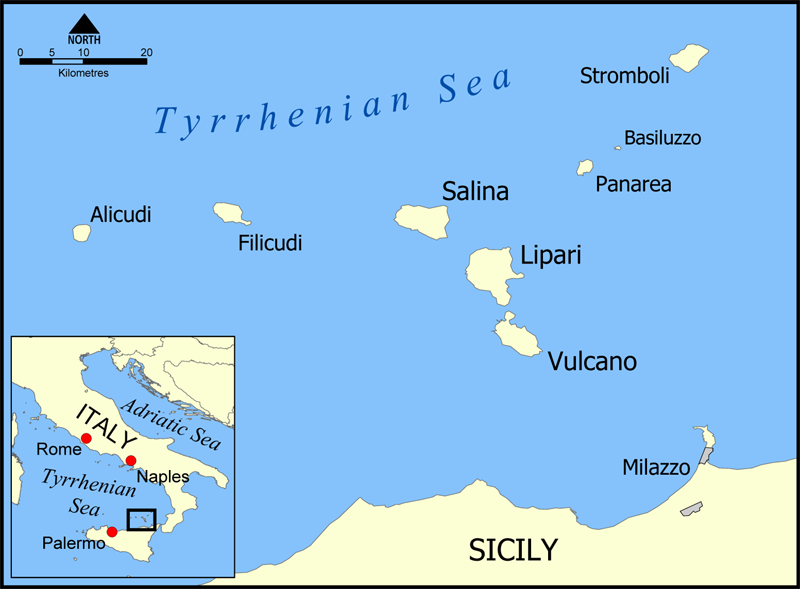
The Aeolian Islands.

Basiluzzo (Italian pronunciation: [baziˈluttso]) is an islet (1 km^{2} (0.39 sq mi)), and the smallest of eight islands in the Aeolian Islands, a volcanic island chain north of Sicily. In antiquity, the island was named "Hicesia".

== Media ==
It is featured in the Italian film L'avventura, where the characters are on a motor boat looking for somewhere to swim. They sail up to Basiluzzo but decide to travel to Lisca Bianca, another of the Aeolian Islands nearest to Basiluzzo.
