= Tyrrhenian Basin =

Coordinates: 39°56′N 12°14′E

The Tyrrhenian Basin is a sedimentary basin located in the western Mediterranean Sea under the Tyrrhenian Sea. It covers a 231,000 km^{2} area that is bounded by Sardinia to the west, Corsica to the northwest, Sicily to the southeast, and peninsular Italy to the northeast. The Tyrrhenian basin displays an irregular seafloor marked by several seamounts and two distinct sub-basins - the Vavilov and Marsili basins. The Vavilov deep plain contains the deepest point of the Tyrrhenian basin at approximately 3785 meters. The basin trends roughly northwest–southeast with the spreading axis trending northeast–southwest.

== Regional geologic setting ==
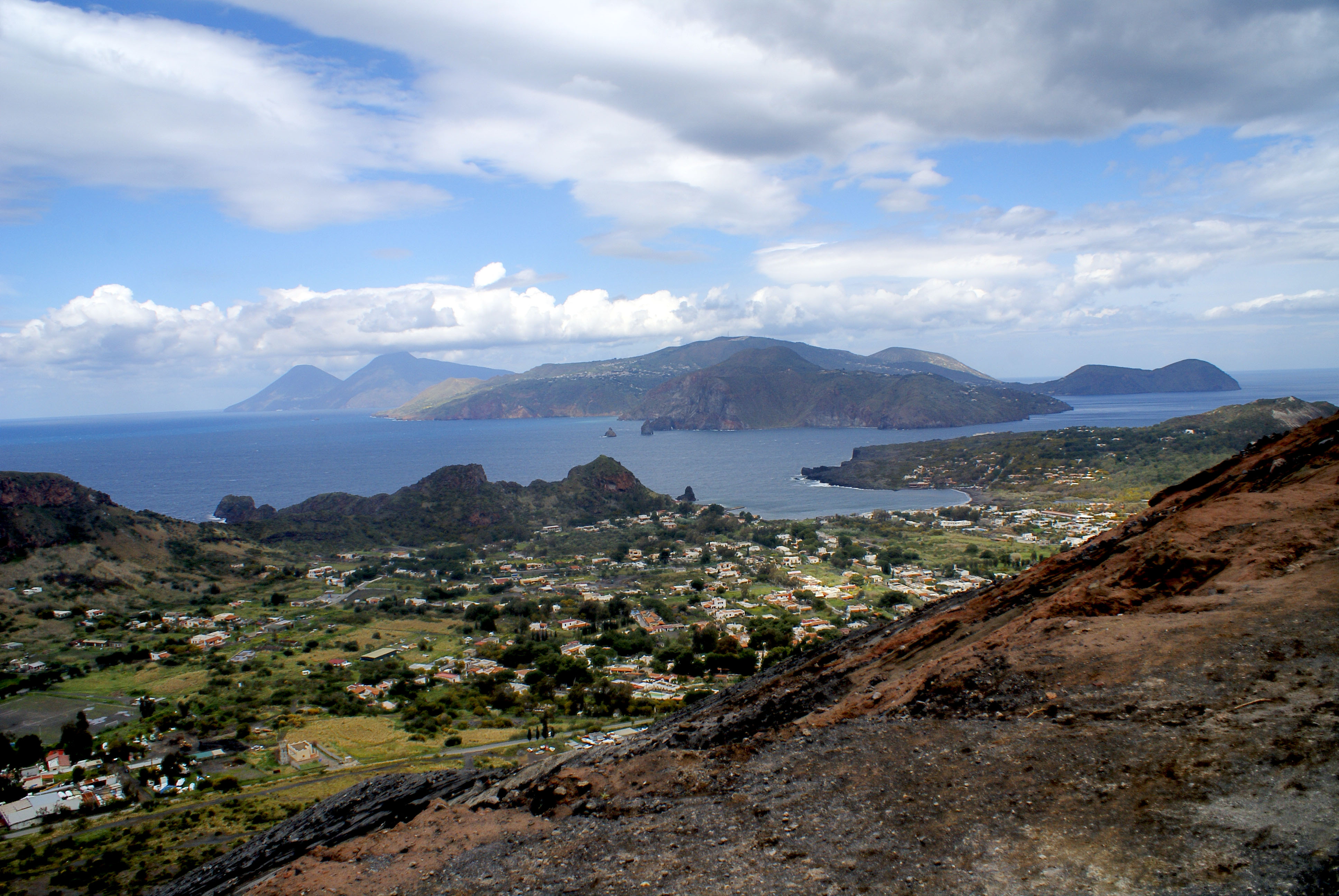
The Aeolian Islands

The Tyrrhenian basin is located in a geologically complex portion of the Mediterranean Sea. The basin is partially encircled by several orogenic belts, including the Apennines to the northeast, the Alps to the north, and the Atlas Mountains to the southwest. It is also bounded by a convergent boundary and associated trench to the southeast. Deep reflection seismic lines near the trench clearly show oceanic lithosphere from the African plate flexing beneath Calabria to join a seismogenic slab that extends down to 500 km beneath the Tyrrhenian basin. Between the upper slope of the trench and Calabria are a number of small fore-arc basins that developed through extensional listric faulting during the Tortonian. These basins subsequently subsided between the late Pliocene and Quaternary and are now infilled with mélange.

The Aeolian Islands north of Calabria and Sicily represent the volcanic arc of the convergent system. The volcanism associated with these islands occurs at the northeast closure of the downgoing slab and began approximately during the late Pliocene to early Pleistocene (1.5–1.7 Ma).

The Tyrrhenian basin lies to the northwest of the Aeolian Islands and represents a back-arc basin formed from tensional forces associated with the northwest subduction of the African Plate beneath the Eurasian Plate. Similar to other back-arc basins, the Tyrrhenian basin displays a shallowing of the Moho discontinuity towards the central part of the basin, a Wadati Benioff zone, abnormally high heat flow (exceeding 200 mW/m^{2} in some places), and an active volcanic belt on the arc-ward edge of the basin.

=== Basement structure ===
Tyrrhenian basement rocks consist of late Paleozoic granites derived from the Hercynian orogeny. Basement rocks in the southeastern portion of the basin were reactivated during the Alpine orogeny while those to the northwest were undisturbed.

== Stratigraphy ==
=== Upper Sardinia Margin ===
The Upper Sardinia Margin is a fault-bounded passive margin located northwest of the Vavilov Basin. Seismic reflection surveys across the Upper Sardinia Margin exhibit a stratigraphic geometry suggestive of pre-rift, syn-rift, and post-rift sequences. Drill cores penetrating to the base of the syn-rift sediments identified a transgressive sequence related to subsidence of the continental crust during the rifting stage of the Tyrrhenian Basin opening. At the base of the syn-rift sequence are 60 meters of Tortonian conglomerate with subrounded clasts derived from metamorphosed carbonate and quartzitic basement. It is inferred that this conglomerate formation was deposited in a high-energy subaerial environment like an alluvial fan. Overlying the conglomerate formation are oyster-bearing glauconitic sandstones deposited in a nearshore environment. Late Tortonian to Early Messinian calcareous ooze and claystone with benthic foram assemblages overlays the sandstone formation; this indicates that water depth increased, perhaps due to subsidence at the end of the syn-rift period. The boundary between the syn-rift and post-rift periods is believed to be located in a 50-meter section of late Messinian gypsum that overlays the calcareous ooze and claystone formations. At the top of the stratigraphic section are 243 meters of Pliocene to Pleistocene post-rift sediment containing calcareous mud with occasional terrigenous clastics and volcanic ash.

=== Lower Sardinia Margin ===
The Lower Sardinia Margin lies near the transition between continental and oceanic crust. This is the easternmost point on the margin where pre-rift, syn-rift, and post-rift sediments can be clearly discerned on seismic reflection profiles. A drill core to the base of the syn-rift sediments revealed 533 meters of thinly-bedded, calcareous, siltstone and sandstone with dispersed detrital gypsum grains and anhydrite nodules. The entire sequence is reversely magnetized, which when placed in the context of the adjacent stratigraphy, suggests that it was deposited during the reversed polarity event of the Gilbert epoch (between 4.79 and 5.41 Ma). The environment of deposition for this section is uncertain; however, due to the presence of thin, well-graded layers and a lack of marine fossils, it is possible that the formation was deposited in a closed lacustrine setting. Overlaying the syn-rift sediments are 200 meters of Pliocene to Pleistocene hemipelagic marine sediment with intermittent volcanic glass. This sediment layer is believed to be deposited after the end of rifting due to its subhorizontal seismic reflection profile.

=== Vavilov Sub-Basin ===
The basement rock in the Vavilov Basin consists of strongly serpentinized peridotite with both high and low-temperature phases of deformation. The peridotite is overlain by 120 meters of tholeiitic pillow basalt containing carbonate-filled veins. Nannofossils and planktonic foraminifera within the carbonate veins constrain the age of emplacement between 3.1 and 3.6 Ma. Immediately above the basalt is a 100-meter-thick section of Pleistocene sedimentary cover, consisting primarily of nannofossil-rich mud with occasional reworked volcanogenic debris.

=== Marsili Sub-Basin ===
The basement rock of the Marsili Basin is vesicular basalt. Due to the abundance (10–30% of rock volume) and size (up to 3 or 4 mm) of the vesicles, it is likely that the basalt was emplaced as a flow rather than a sill. Overlaying the basement is 250 meters of calcareous mud and ooze with interbedded volcanoclastic layers. Benthic foraminifera and magnetic anomaly data from the base of this section constrain the terminus of rifting between 1.67 and 1.87 Ma. At the top of the stratigraphic section are 350 meters of volcanoclastic turbidites.

== Basin tectonics and evolution ==
=== Temporal onset of rifting ===
It is widely agreed that extension in the Tyrrhenian basin began in the late Miocene, as shown by the recognition in seismic reflection profiles of pre-evaporitic (i.e. pre-Messinian) sediments in the western Tyrrhenian and by age estimates based on the overall lithospheric thickness, basement relief, and heat flow. K-Ar dating of peripheral oceanic basalts, drilled at the southeast edge of the Vavilov plain, estimates the beginning of extension to be 7.3 ± 1.3 Ma. Basalts recovered near the spreading center, in middle of the Vavilov plain, yielded ages of 3.4–3.6 Ma. This means that back-arc extension in this part of the basin occurred approximately between the late Tortonian and the middle Pliocene. However, in the Marsili plain, the oldest basaltic crust was found to be 2.1 Ma. This lower age limit, along with the presence of a saddle containing continental crust (the "Issel bridge") between the Vavilov and Marsili plains, implies that there were two distinct episodes of back-arc extension.

=== Mechanism of development ===
Between the Tortonian and middle Pliocene, W-E directed extension opened the Vavilov plain and Sardinia margin in the northwest portion of the present day basin. By the end of the Pliocene, extension rapidly turned to NW-SE and was limited to the southeastern Marsili plain. This rapid shift in the direction and spatial location of extension may be due to how the relative velocities of interacting tectonic plates change over time. For example, if the horizontal velocity of the overriding Eurasian plate exceeds the velocity of slab rollback and trench retreat in the underthrusting African plate, then extension should not occur in the back-arc region. However, if the velocity of slab rollback and trench retreat exceeds that of the overriding plate, then back-arc extension will occur.

The Pliocene-Pleistocene changes in Tyrrhenian back-arc extension may have also been influenced by the adjacent Adriatic and Sicilian forelands. These sectors were not thinned by rifting and are characterized by normal continental lithosphere. During its southeastward migration, the passively retreating oceanic slab had to adjust and deform in relation the large and buoyant continental sectors. Post-Pliocene migration was eventually driven through the narrow corridor (250 km) represented by the present Ionian Sea and thus separated the Adriatic and Sicilian sectors. Changes in lithospheric composition may have also contributed to differences in subduction geometry. For instance, during the first episode of subduction, thinned continental lithosphere underlying the Apenninic margin subducted beneath the Eurasian plate. However, in the second episode of subduction, it was instead Ionian oceanic lithosphere that was involved in subduction. A transition from continental to oceanic lithosphere subduction could explain the late onset of arc volcanism (2-1.5 Ma) as well as the lack of arc volcanism in the central Tyrrhenian basin.

=== Rates of extension and subsidence ===
The full spreading rate of the Tyrrhenian basin has been estimated to be 3–5 cm/yr based on kinematic reconstructions and magnetostratigraphy. This is a relatively slow spreading rate when compared to spreading rates in other back-arc basins like the East Scotia basin (5–7 cm/yr) and the Manus basin (13 cm/yr). The ratio between the initial crustal thickness and final crustal thickness, also known as the beta factor, is estimated to be 3.3 for the Tyrrhenian basin.

== Petroleum resources ==
Although there are numerous petroleum plays in mainland Italy and the northern Ionian Sea, the potential for hydrocarbon accumulation in most of the Tyrrhenian basin is very poor. This is primarily due to the basin's high geothermal gradient which pushes the oil window to very shallow depths where structural and stratigraphic traps are uncommon. There is, however, active hydrocarbon exploration on the south edge of the basin near the Sicily Channel. Here, the small Narciso and Nilde fields produce sulphur-rich, light to medium-grade crude oil (API gravity ranging between 21 and 39). The primary reservoirs in these fields are Miocene karstic limestones that are sealed by Pliocene clays. The source of the hydrocarbons is unknown but is inferred to be Mesozoic limestone. Traps are structural in nature and are primarily thrust faults related to the Tunisian Atlas thrust belt.
