= Salina, Sicily =

Island north of Sicily, Italy

Salina
Native name: Dydime (Greek)
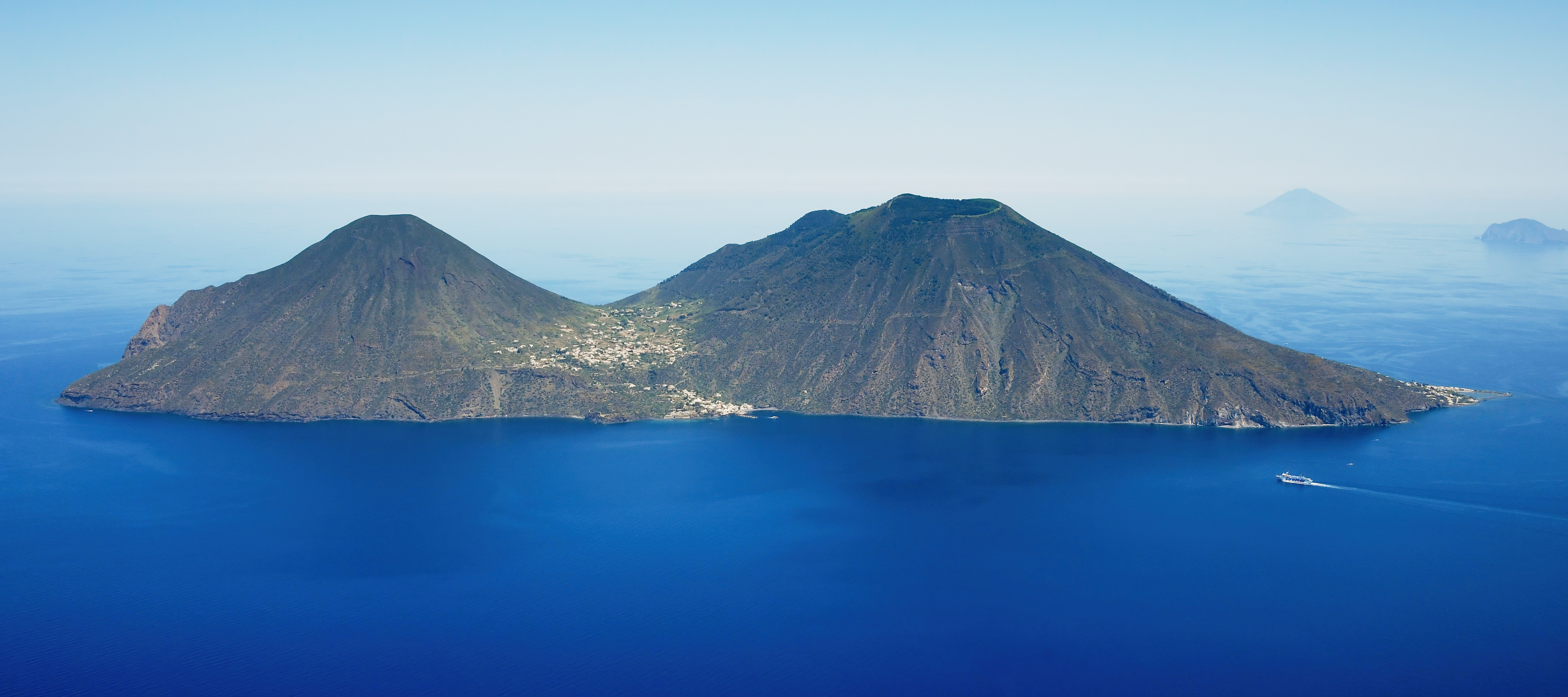
- Aerial view of Salina from the southwest

- Location within Italy

Geography
- Location: Tyrrhenian Sea
- Coordinates: 38°33′55″N 14°50′00″E
- Archipelago: Aeolian Islands
- Area: 26.31 km^{2} (10.16 sq mi)
- Highest elevation: 962 m (3156 ft)
- Highest point: Monte Fossa delle Felci

Administration
- Italy
- Region: Sicily
- Metropolitan City: Messina
- Municipalities: Santa Marina Salina, Malfa, Leni

Demographics
- Population: 2549 (2026)
- Pop. density: 96.9/km^{2} (251/sq mi)

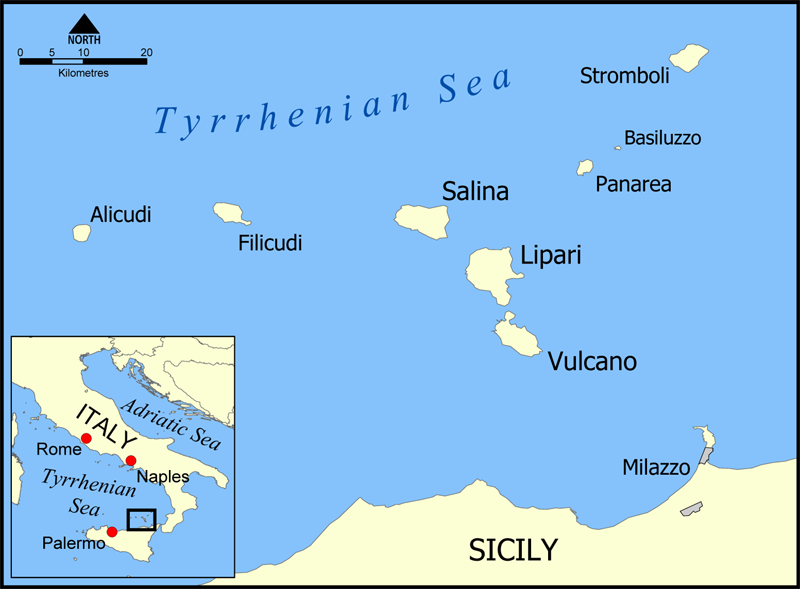
The Aeolian Islands.

Port of Santa Maria di Salina.

Salina (Italian pronunciation: [saˈliːna]) is one of the Aeolian Islands north of Sicily, Southern Italy. It is the second largest island in the archipelago.

Salina is divided between three municipalities: Santa Marina on the eastern coast, Malfa to the north, and Leni to the south-west. From Leni down towards the sea is the village of Rinella. Above the village of Leni is Valdichiesa in the center of the island. The other smaller villages are Capo Faro, Pollara and Lingua.

There are currently approximately 2,549 residents living on the island.

== History ==
A Greek settlement, from the fourth century BC through to the times of Imperial Rome, once lay on the modern-day site of the small town of Santa Marina. A number of tombs from this era have been discovered further inland. Several traces of Greek and Roman culture have been found on the island.

In the Hellenic Age the island was named "Didyme" (Δίδυμη), a Greek name which refers to the two mountains as "twins". The island was inhabited as far back as the Bronze Age and has been developed and then abandoned many times over the subsequent millennia.

Areas on the island, including the two mountain peaks, were designated as a natural reserve in 1981.

== Geography ==
Salina has a total surface area of 26.38 km^{2} (10 sq mi). It is included on the World Heritage List especially because of its worth for vulcanology. It is composed of six volcanoes: the oldest ones are at Pizzo di Corvo, Monte Rivi and close to Capo Faro, although these are barely recognisable from a morphological point of view, while the volcano-layer of Monte Fossa delle Felci at 962 m (3,156 ft) is the highest peak in the archipelago and Monte dei Porri 860 m (2,822 ft) are both almost perfectly preserved. A lower crater lies just above sea level near the small village of Pollara, on the north west corner of the island, half of which has fallen into the sea.

The most recent eruption on Salina occurred on the western part of the island about 13,000 years ago and formed the semi-circular crater of Pollara; its activity was mainly explosive and produced large pumice deposits.

All that remains of the endogenic activities are some post-volcanic phenomena called “gurgling” and a thermal spring at Pertuso. The gurgling phenomena are at Rinella and are basically caused by the emission of underwater gas (hydrogen sulphate) and vapours. When this phenomenon is at its most active it can lift the sea-bed.

=== Vegetation ===
From a distance Salina looks entirely green with two rounded high mountains and a smooth coastline. More than 400 different types of plants grow on the island and grapes, olives and capers are cultivated.

Salina was the first among the Aeolian islands to protect its environment with a natural preserve, known as the Riserva Naturale del Fossa delle Felci e dei Porri.

The mountainsides of the island are covered with ferns, poplars, chestnut trees and typical Mediterranean vegetation including with caper bushes, prickly pear cactus. and a variety of orchards, olive groves and vineyards. The island is the only production area of the Malvasia white wine. There has also been a local revival of the production of superior-quality low-acid olive oil.

It is claimed that Salina produces the best capers in the world and during the first weekend of June there is an annual caper festival.

== Demographics ==
As of 2026, the population is 2,549, of which 51.8% are male, and 48.2% are female. Minors make up 12.4% of the population, and seniors make up 26.9%.

Historical population

Year	Pop.	±%
1861	6,671	—
1871	5,300	−20.6%
1881	6,285	+18.6%
1901	5,004	−20.4%
1911	4,300	−14.1%
1921	3,798	−11.7%
1931	3,589	−5.5%
1936	3,541	−1.3%

Year	Pop.	±%
1951	2,983	−15.8%
1961	2,737	−8.2%
1971	2,193	−19.9%
1981	2,237	+2.0%
1991	2,401	+7.3%
2001	2,300	−4.2%
2011	2,582	+12.3%
2021	2,513	−2.7%

Source: ISTAT

=== Immigration ===
As of 2025, immigrants make up 13.4% of the population.

== Culture ==
Salina is the supposed location of the sirens in Homer's Odyssey.

Salina was mentioned by Alexandre Dumas in the memoirs of his journey to the Eolian islands.

The 1994 Michael Radford film Il Postino: The Postman was filmed on the island of Procida and on Salina.

Salina is also a setting in the novel sequence Vango, by Timothée de Fombelle.

== Main sights ==
- The salt lake in Lingua was once a site for production of sea salt, hence the name Salina ("salt mill" in Italian).
- On the slopes of the Fossa, several Roman tombs have been excavated.
- Sanctuary of the Madonna del Terzito, located between Malfa and Leni in the saddle known as Valdichiesa between the twin volcanoes, and built in 1630. The religious centre of Salina, it attracts pilgrims on the main feast day of July 23 every year.
- Santa Marina Salina is the most lively part of the island. This commune is where many visitors are first dropped off and contains boutiques and specialty shops.

In the 18th century the ruins of a typical Imperial Roman villa were noted here but have since sunk into the ground.

== Transport ==
Salina has two ports, Santa Marina and Rinella, served by ferries and hydrofoils. Hydrofoil service is active from Naples, Palermo, Reggio Calabria, Messina and Milazzo.

There is a regular bus service connecting all the villages on the island. A main road connects Lingua, Santa Marina, Malfa and Pollara; a side road runs between the two volcanoes to Leni and Rinella.

== See also ==
- List of volcanoes in Italy
- List of islands of Italy

== Other sources ==
- Ezio Giunta, ed. (2005). "Salina". Estateolie 2005 - the Essential Guide (English Version of Tourist Guidebook): 66–79.
- The Leopard by Tomasi Di Lampedusa
