= Il Globo =

Italian language newspaper in Australia

- Type: Bi-weekly newspaper
- Format: Tabloid
- Owner: Italian Media Corporation
- Founder(s): Tarcisio Valmorbida, Ubaldo Larobina
- Founded: 1959; 67 years ago
- Headquarters: Melbourne, Australia
- Circulation: 20,000 (as of 2005)
- Website: www.italianmedia.com.au

Il Globo is an Italian language newspaper, published biweekly on Monday and Thursday in Melbourne, Australia. The newspaper's Sydney counterpart is La Fiamma.

== History ==
It was established in Melbourne by Tarcisio Valmorbida and Ubaldo Larobina, and the first issue was published on November 4, 1959. Il Globo had a circulation of over 20,000 based on claimed circulation by the newspaper, one of the largest amongst non-English language publications in Australia.

Il Globo reports not only issues and news regarding Italy and Australia but reports on issues that relate to the local Italian-Australian community in Western Australia, South Australia, Northern Territory and Victoria

== Sources ==
- Mascitelli, Bruno and Battiston, Simone (eds.) (2009), Il Globo. Fifty Years of an Italian Newspaper in Australia, Connor Court Publishing, Ballan, Victoria. ISBN 978-1-921421-31-0
- Mascitelli, Bruno and Battiston, Simone (2008), The Italian expatriate vote in Australia. Democratic right, democratic wrong or political opportunism?, Connor Court Publishing, Ballan, Victoria. ISBN 978-1-921421-09-9
- Pascoe, Robert (1987), Buongiorno Australia. Our Italian Heritage, Greenhouse Publications, Richmond, Victoria. ISBN 0-86436-062-2
- Pascoe, Robert (1989), 'The Italian Press in Australia,' in Abe (I.) Wade Ata and Colin Ryan, The Ethnic Press in Australia, Academia Press and Footprint Publications, Melbourne, Victoria, pp. 201–206. ISBN 0-9589668-2-6
