= Santa Marina Salina =

- Comune
- Comune di Santa Marina Salina
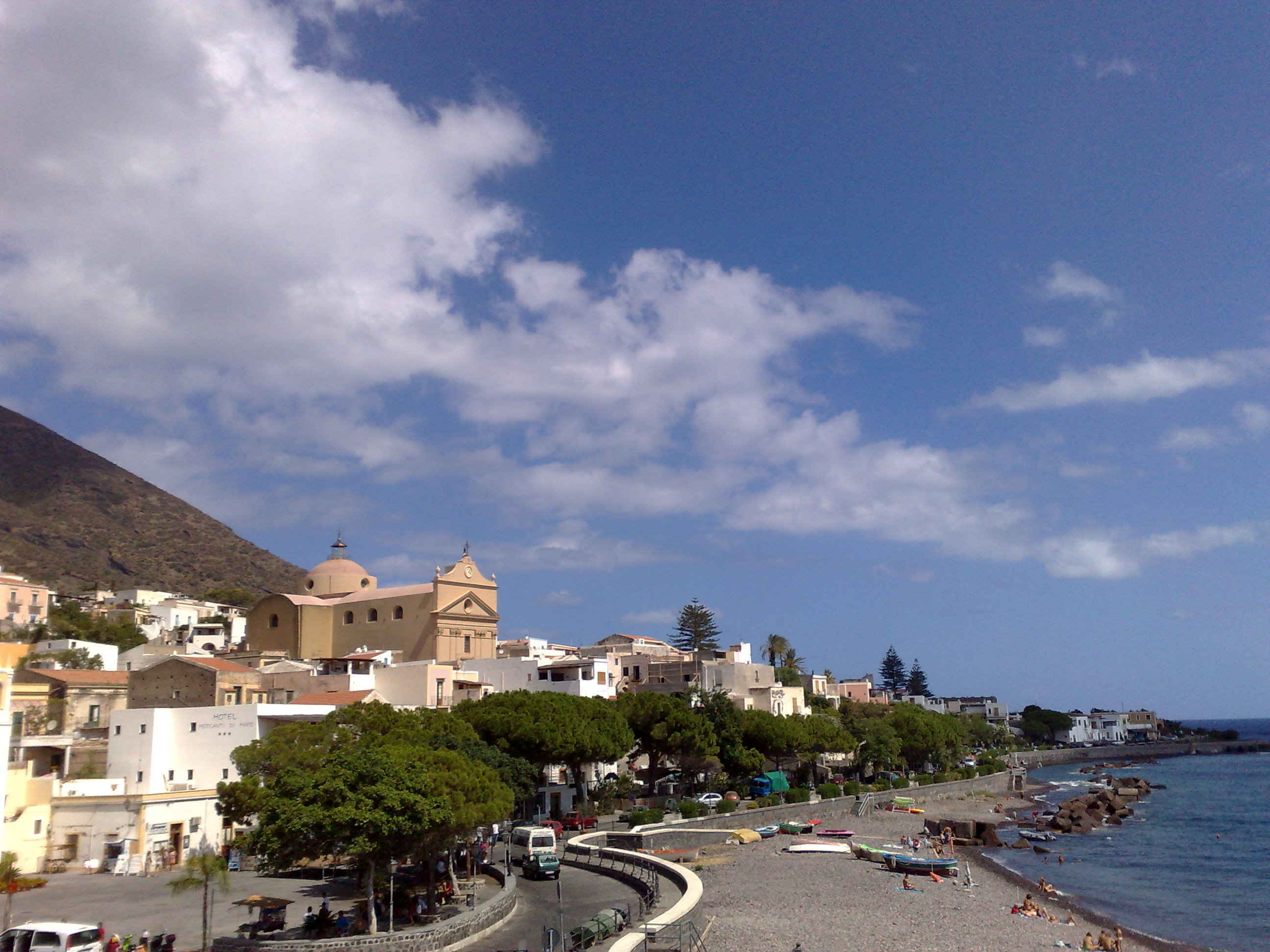
- The seaside in Santa Marina Salina

- Coat of arms

- Location within Italy Location within Sicily
- Coordinates: 38°34′N 14°52′E
- Country: Italy
- Region: Sicily
- Metropolitan city: Messina (ME)
- Frazioni: Lingua

Government
  - Mayor: Domenico Arabia

Area
  - Total: 8.78 km^{2} (3.39 sq mi)
- Elevation: 25 m (82 ft)

Population (2026)
  - Total: 877
  - Density: 99.9/km^{2} (259/sq mi)
- Demonym: Santamarienesi
- Time zone: UTC+1 (CET)
  - Summer (DST): UTC+2 (CEST)
- Postal code: 98050
- Dialing code: 090
- Website: Official website

Santa Marina Salina is one of the main villages on Salina, one of the Aeolian Islands. Administratively, it is a comune (municipality) in the Metropolitan City of Messina in the autonomous island region of Sicily in southern Italy. It is located about 140 kilometres (87 mi) northeast of Palermo and about 70 kilometres (43 mi) northwest of Messina. It has 877 inhabitants.

Santa Marina Salina borders the municipalities of Leni and Malfa.

== Etymology ==
The name of the town derives from the cult of Saint Marina (to whom one of the churches in the settlement is also dedicated), which spread to the island starting from the 16th century. This cult was probably brought by colonists of Venetian origin (Saint Marina is co-patron of Venice), who arrived as exiles to the Aeolian Islands from various Mediterranean locations due to the gradual reduction of the territories of the Republic of Venice conquered by the Ottoman Empire.

The specification "Salina" was added when the town became an autonomous municipality in 1909, perhaps to distinguish it from the already existing municipality of Santa Marina in Campania. It refers to the name of the island, which derives from the aforementioned saltwater lagoon located in the Lingua area, which was used in ancient times as a salt pan: the lagoon gave its name to the entire island.

== History ==
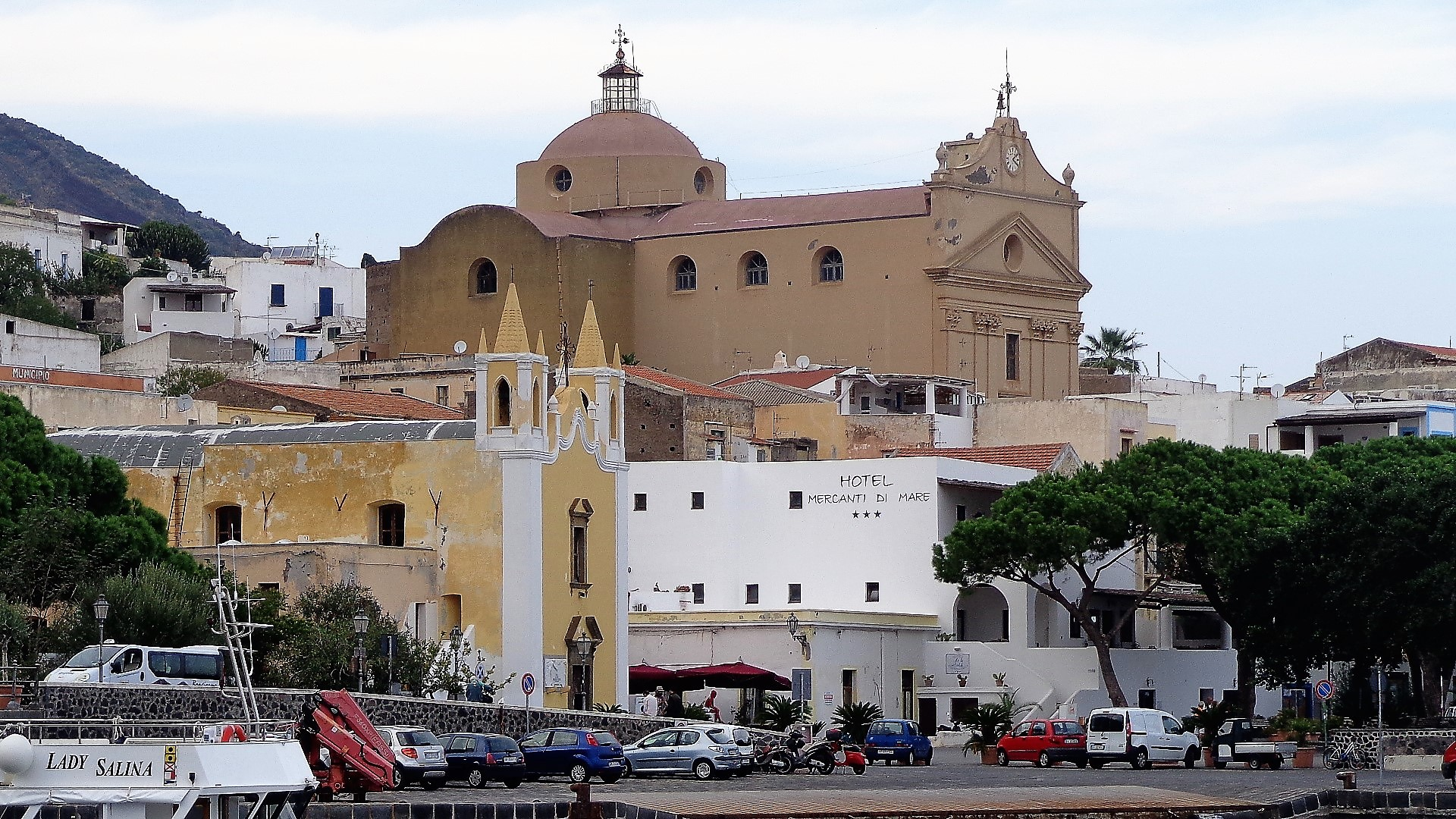
The town center, the Church of Maria Santissima Addolorata and, lower down, the church of Santa Marina

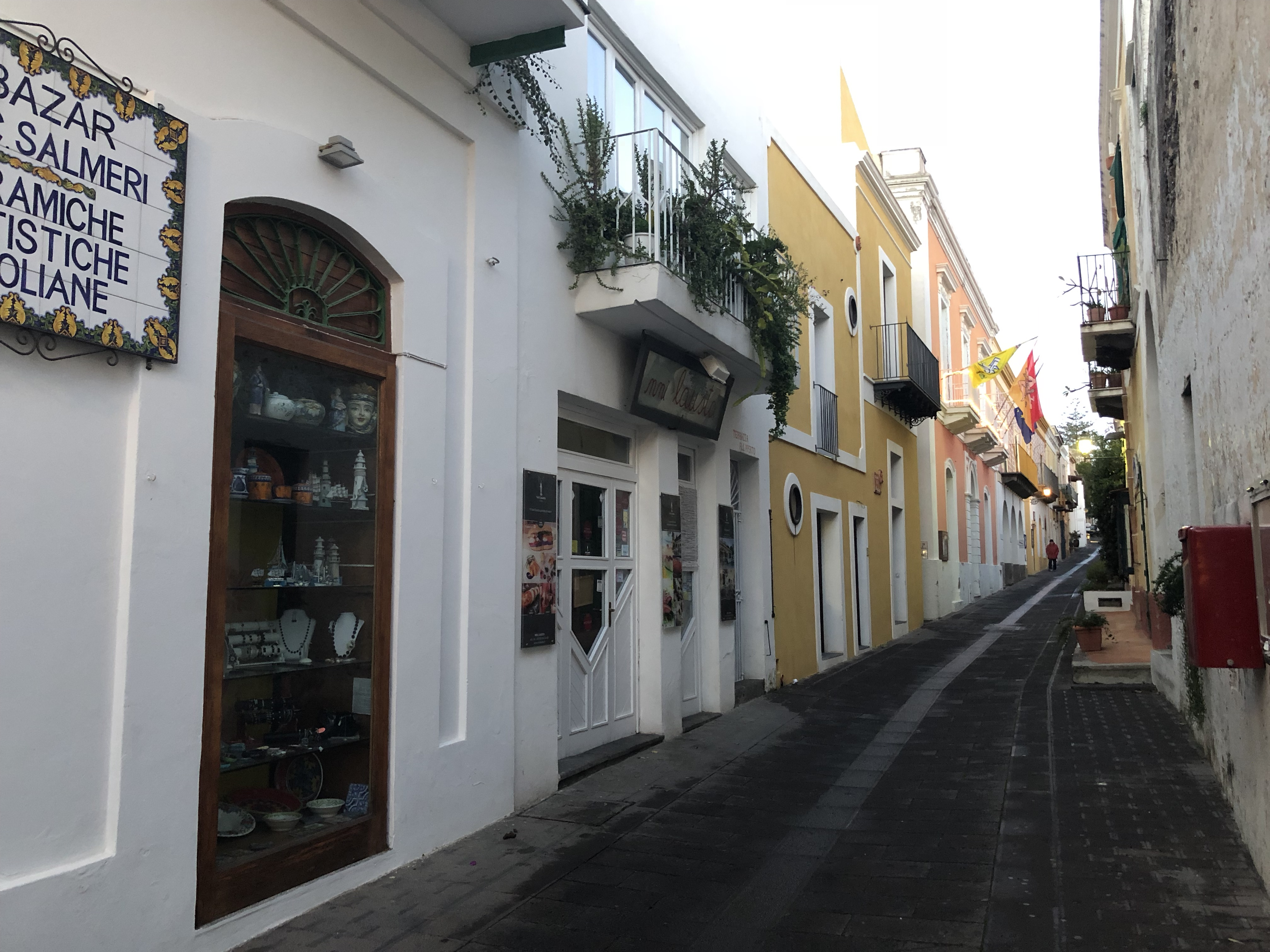
Street in Santa Marina Salina

Archaeological finds testify that the island of Salina has been inhabited since the 5th millennium BC. The colonization of the island by people of Greek descent, likely the Aeolians, dates back to the 3rd millennium BC. Other finds attest to human presence in the territory of Santa Marina Salina in the 15th century BC. Following the destruction of this settlement, likely carried out by the Ausoni, the island presumably remained uninhabited until the 6th century BC, when Lipari and consequently Salina were populated by Doric peoples, who made Santa Marina Salina the main center of the island. In the following centuries, Greeks, Romans, and Byzantines succeeded one another until the conquest by the Arabs in 840. In the 12th century, the island was then populated by Amalfi refugees who landed at Malfa.

In recent times, in 1867, the island of Salina, being one of the only two densely populated Aeolian islands (the other being Lipari), was ordered to become an autonomous municipality, separating from the municipality of Lipari, which remained for the other six islands. Thus, the municipality of Salina was created, with its capital in Santa Marina. However, the other towns on the island had difficulty bearing the dependence on the capital, so in 1909, the separation resulted in the three municipalities of Santa Marina Salina, Malfa, and Leni.

=== Symbols ===
The coat of arms and the banner were granted by decree of the President of the Republic on November 21, 1996.

Coat of Arms

The coat of arms is truncated (divided horizontally). The upper part is cut (divided diagonally) and bears seven stars symbolizing the Aeolian Islands, arranged such that Salina is in the center, along with the trinacria, symbol of Sicily. The lower part depicts the island of Salina as seen from the sea and an anchor, symbolizing navigation.

Banner

The banner is a cloth of white.

== Geography ==
The municipality of Santa Marina Salina is located in the eastern part of the island of Salina, at the foot of Monte Fossa delle Felci (which rises to 962 m above sea level and is the highest point of all the Aeolian Islands) and Monte Rivi. It covers the area that extends from the mountain summits to the sea. It is a densely vegetated area, composed of eucalyptus, red eucalyptus, acacias, alders, elms, pines, holm oaks, chestnuts, ferns, and many others. Along the coast is the town of Santa Marina Salina, where the parish church and the main shops and nightlife venues are located. At the southern end of the municipality is the district of Lingua, near a saltwater lagoon.

== Demographics ==
As of 2026, the population is 877, of which 52.2% are male, and 47.8% are female. Minors make up 10.9% of the population, and seniors make up 28.2%.

Historical population

Year	Pop.	±%
1861	2,841	—
1871	2,258	−20.5%
1881	2,677	+18.6%
1901	2,034	−24.0%
1911	1,590	−21.8%
1921	1,396	−12.2%
1931	1,291	−7.5%
1936	1,346	+4.3%

Year	Pop.	±%
1951	1,017	−24.4%
1961	919	−9.6%
1971	759	−17.4%
1981	762	+0.4%
1991	848	+11.3%
2001	808	−4.7%
2011	892	+10.4%
2021	854	−4.3%

Source: ISTAT

=== Languages and dialects ===
Distribution of the Sicilian group

In addition to the official Italian language, the Sicilian language is spoken in its Aeolian variant in Santa Marina Salina. The richness of influences in Sicilian, which belongs to the Romance languages family and is classified in the extreme southern group, derives from the geographical position of the island, whose centrality in the Mediterranean Sea has made it a land of conquest by numerous peoples in the Mediterranean area.

=== Immigration ===
As of 2025, immigrants make up 14.7% of the population. The 5 largest foreign countries of birth are Morocco, Romania, Australia, Germany, and the United States.

== Sights ==
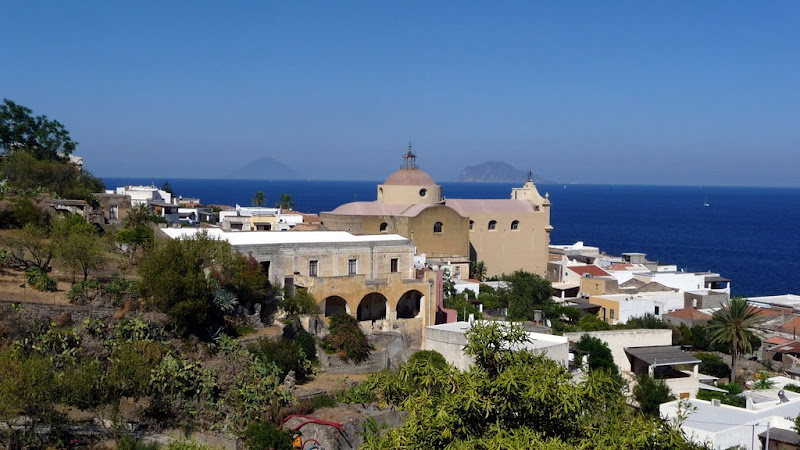
View of the town

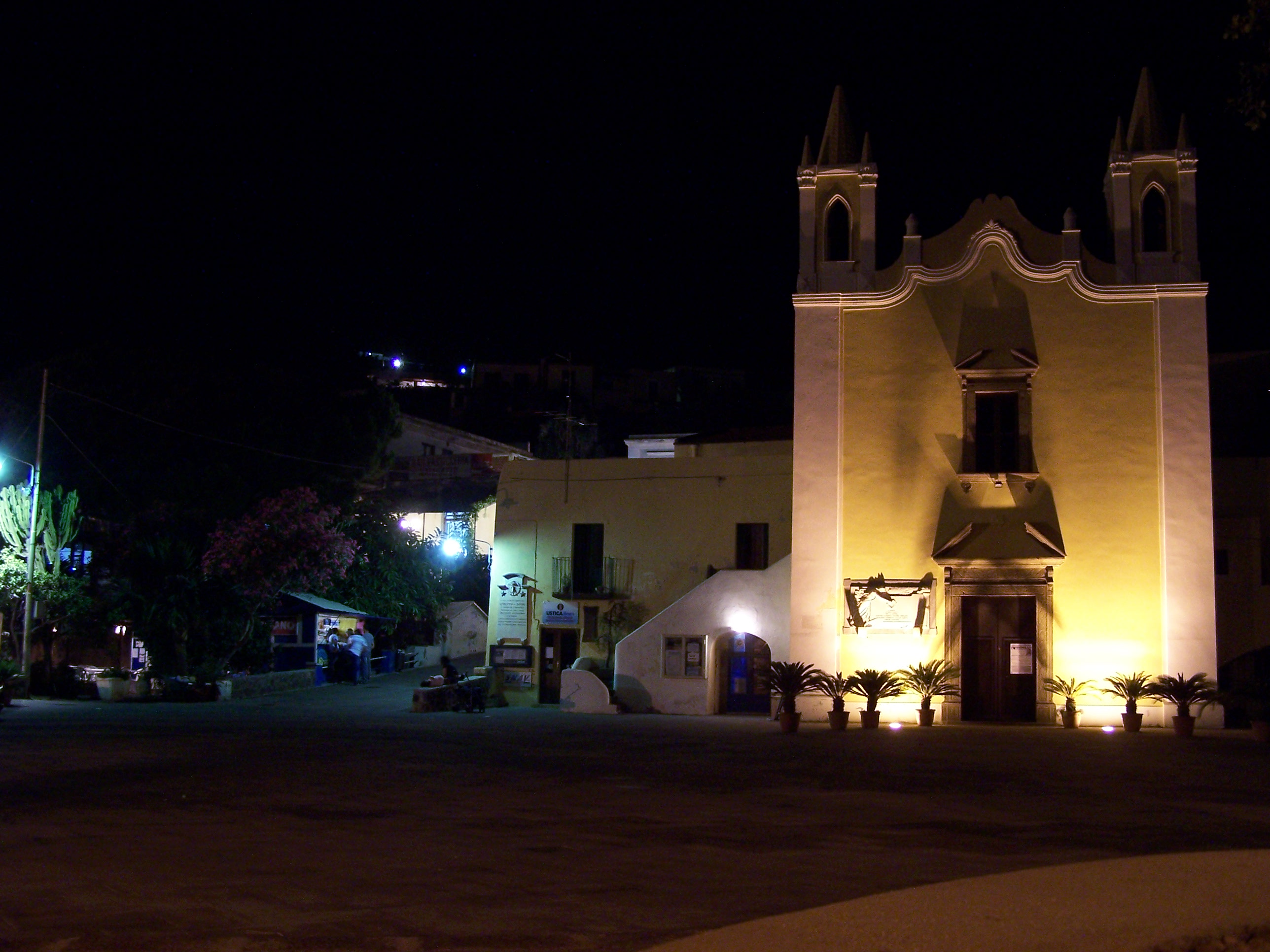
The church of Santa Marina at night

=== Religious architectures ===
- Church of Maria Santissima Addolorata
- Church of Santa Marina
- Church of San Bartolomeo

=== Museums ===
- Civic Museum (Santa Marina Salina) - This museum showcases the local culture and history, including archaeological findings from the region.

=== Archaeological sites ===
- Villaggio di Portella
- The Saracenic caves, excavated in tuff as a hiding place against the raids of the Saracens around 650. They are a series of interconnected spaces containing inscriptions and votive signs from that era
- Salt collection pools, dating back to the Greek period (3rd century BC), located in Lingua
- Archaeological area of Barone (thermal baths and fish salting plant)

=== Natural areas ===
- Nature Reserve Le Montagne delle Felci e dei Porri
- Special Protection Area near the lagoon of Lingua

== Culture ==
=== Festivals ===
Several traditional festivals are celebrated in Santa Marina Salina, including:

- Feast of Saint Marina, celebrated on July 18, honoring the town's patron saint with religious processions and local festivities.
- The "Sagra del Cappero" (Capers Festival), held in August, promotes local agriculture and traditional cuisine, featuring dishes made with capers, a local specialty.

=== Cuisine ===
The culinary traditions of Santa Marina Salina reflect the Mediterranean diet, characterized by fresh fish, vegetables, and local products. Specialties include:

- Capers from Lingua - Renowned for their quality, they are used in various dishes.
- Aeolian bread - A traditional bread made with local ingredients.
- Fish dishes, particularly swordfish and sardines, often grilled or baked with Mediterranean herbs.

== Education ==
=== Schools ===
- Primary School of Santa Marina Salina
- Elementary School of Lingua

== Economy ==
The economy of Santa Marina Salina is primarily based on tourism, agriculture, and fishing. The island attracts visitors for its natural beauty, beaches, and rich cultural heritage. Agriculture is centered around the cultivation of capers, olives, and grapes, which are also used in local wine production. Fishing remains an important activity, with local fishermen providing fresh seafood to the community and tourists.
