= Aeolian Islands =

Volcanically active archipelago off the northern coast of Sicily, Italy

Native name: Isole Eolie, Ìsuli Eoli
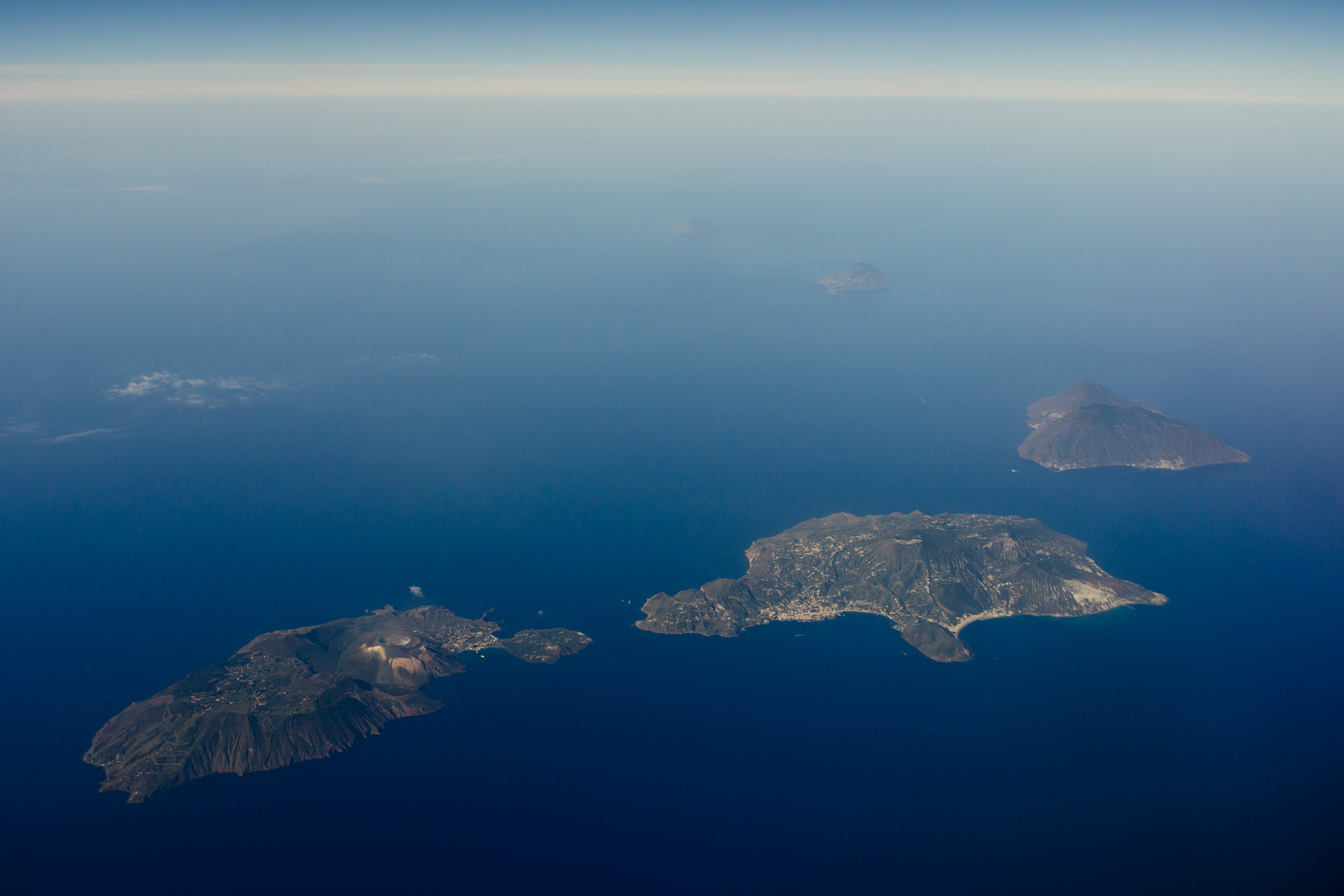
- Aerial view of the Aeolian Islands

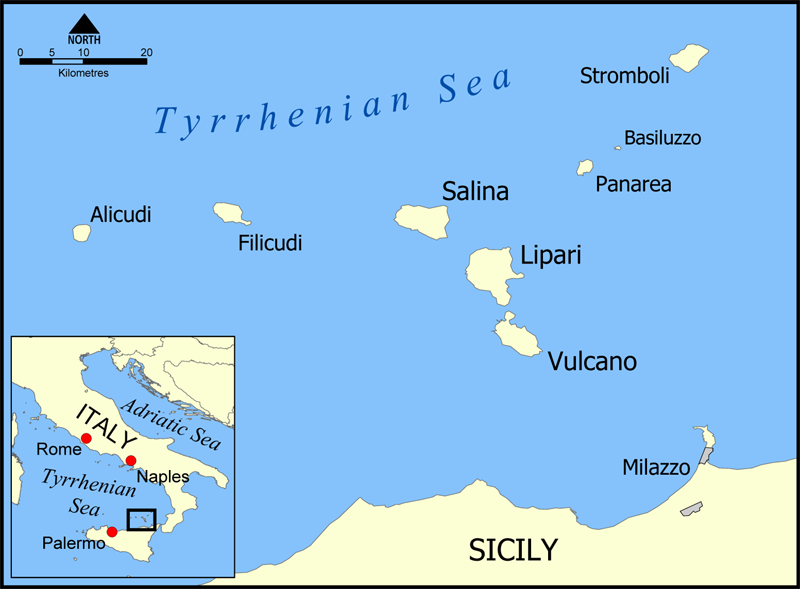
- Map of the Aeolian Islands

Geography
- Location: Tyrrhenian Sea
- Coordinates: 38°32′N 14°54′E
- Area: 114.7 km^{2} (44.3 sq mi)

Administration
- Italy
- Region: Sicily
- Metropolitan City: Messina

Demographics
- Population: 15,419 (1 January 2019)
- Pop. density: 134.4/km^{2} (348.1/sq mi)

UNESCO World Heritage Site
- Official name: Isole Eolie (Aeolian Islands)
- Criteria: Natural: viii
- Reference: 908
- Inscription: 2000 (24th Session)
- Area: 1,216 ha (3,000 acres)

The Aeolian Islands (/iːˈoʊliən/ ee-OH-lee-ən; Italian: Isole Eolie [ˈiːzole eˈɔːlje]; Sicilian: Ìsuli Eoli), sometimes referred to as the Lipari Islands or Lipari group (/ˈlɪpəri/ LIP-ər-ee, Italian: [ˈliːpari]) after their largest island, are a volcanic archipelago in the Tyrrhenian Sea north of Sicily, said to be named after Aeolus, the mythical ruler of the winds. The islands' inhabitants are known as Aeolians (Italian: Eoliani). The islands had a permanent population of 14,224 at the 2011 census; the latest official estimate is 15,419 as of 1 January 2019. The Aeolian Islands are a popular tourist destination in the summer and attract up to 600,000 visitors annually.

There are seven significant islands: Lipari, Vulcano, Salina, Stromboli, Filicudi, Alicudi and Panarea, and a set of minor islands and rocks.

== Geography ==
The Aeolian Islands are 30 to 80 kilometres (19 to 50 mi) off the north coast of Sicily in the Tyrrhenian Sea. Vulcano is located closest to the Sicilian coast. Lipari and Salina follow to the north, Filicudi and Alicudi to the west, and Panarea and Stromboli to the northeast. In addition to these seven inhabited islands, there are a number of smaller, uninhabited islands and rocky cliffs, such as Basiluzzo, Strombolicchio, Dattilo and Lisca Bianca.

The largest island is Lipari (37.5 km^{2} [14.5 mi^{2}]), followed by Salina (26.8 km^{2} [10.3 mi^{2}]), Vulcano (21.2 km^{2} [8.2 mi^{2}]), Stromboli (12.6 km^{2} [4.9 mi^{2}]), Filicudi (9.5 km^{2} [3.7 mi^{2}]) and Alicudi (5.2 km^{2} [2.0 mi^{2}]). The smallest inhabited island, at 3.4 km^{2} (1.3 mi^{2}), is Panarea. The highest elevation of the Lipari Islands is Monte Fossa delle Felci on Salina, which reaches a height of 962 m (3,156 ft).

== Geology ==
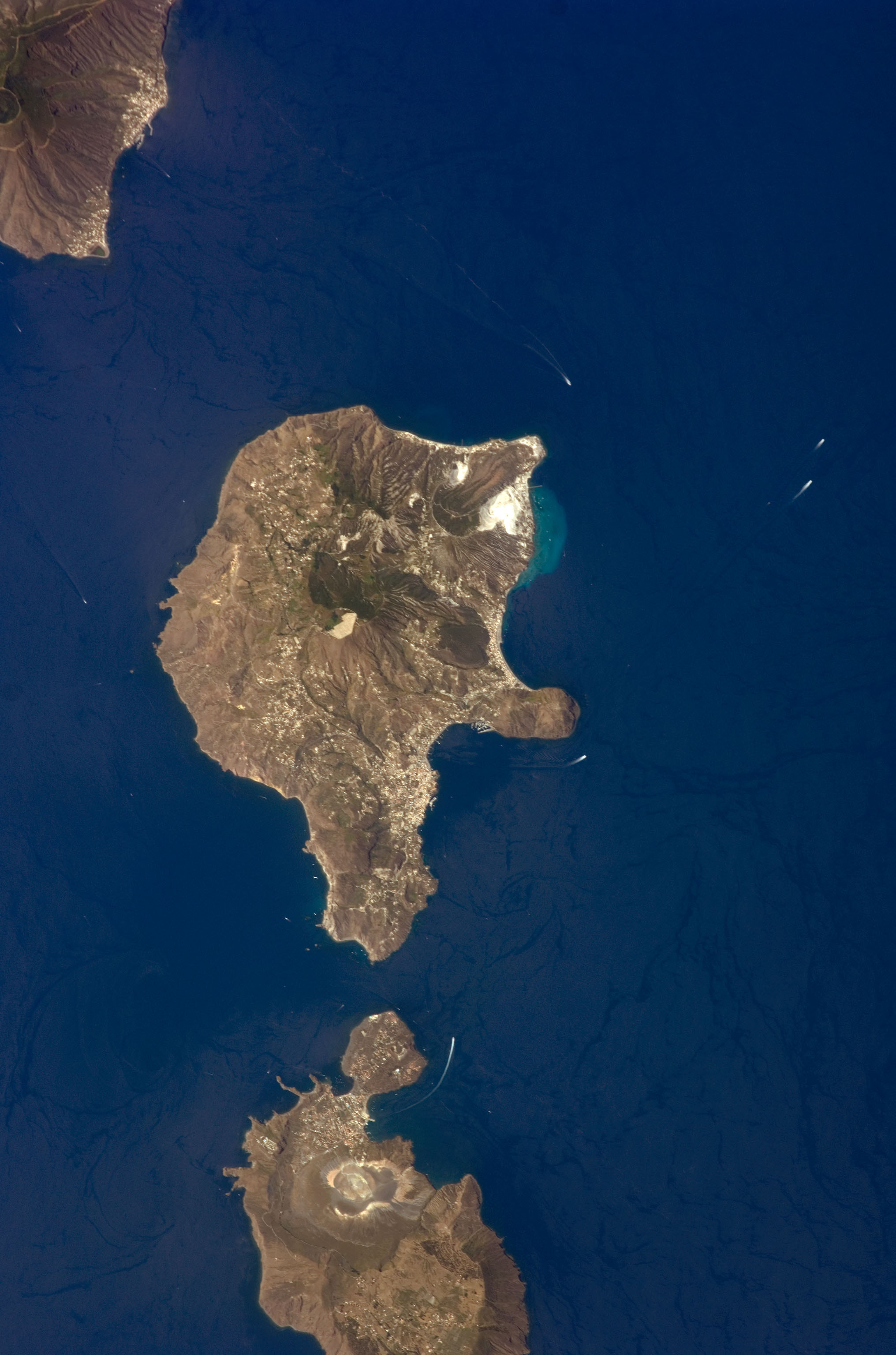
The Aeolian Islands (part of Salina, Lipari, and Vulcano) seen from space.

The seven Aeolian Islands, covering an area of 1,600 km^{2} (620 sq mi), originated in the Tyrrhenian Basin, a great plain at the bottom of the Tyrrhenian Sea. Emissions of lava from depths of up to 3,600 m (11,800 ft) resulted in the formation of the Aeolian Islands, together with Ustica and a series of submarine volcanoes named Magnani, Vavilov, Marsili and Palinuro, as well as two that are unnamed.

The present shape of the Aeolian Islands is the result of volcanic activity over a period of 260,000 years. There are two active volcanoes – Stromboli and Vulcano. Steaming fumaroles and thermal waters are on most of the islands. The volcanic activity has also left the islands with a very fertile soil that is beneficial in the growth of natural flora.

Geologically the archipelago is defined as a volcanic arc. The origin of the Aeolian Islands is due to movement of the Earth's crust as a result of plate tectonics. The African continental shelf is in constant movement towards Europe. Its subduction underneath the Eurasian plate generates magma, which rises to the surface to form the volcanoes. The "Aeolian Arc" extends for more than 140 km (87 mi). It is a section of a larger area of geological instability across the Mediterranean region, caused by the collision of Africa and Europe, which includes Sicily, Calabria, and Campania together with Greece and the Aegean islands.

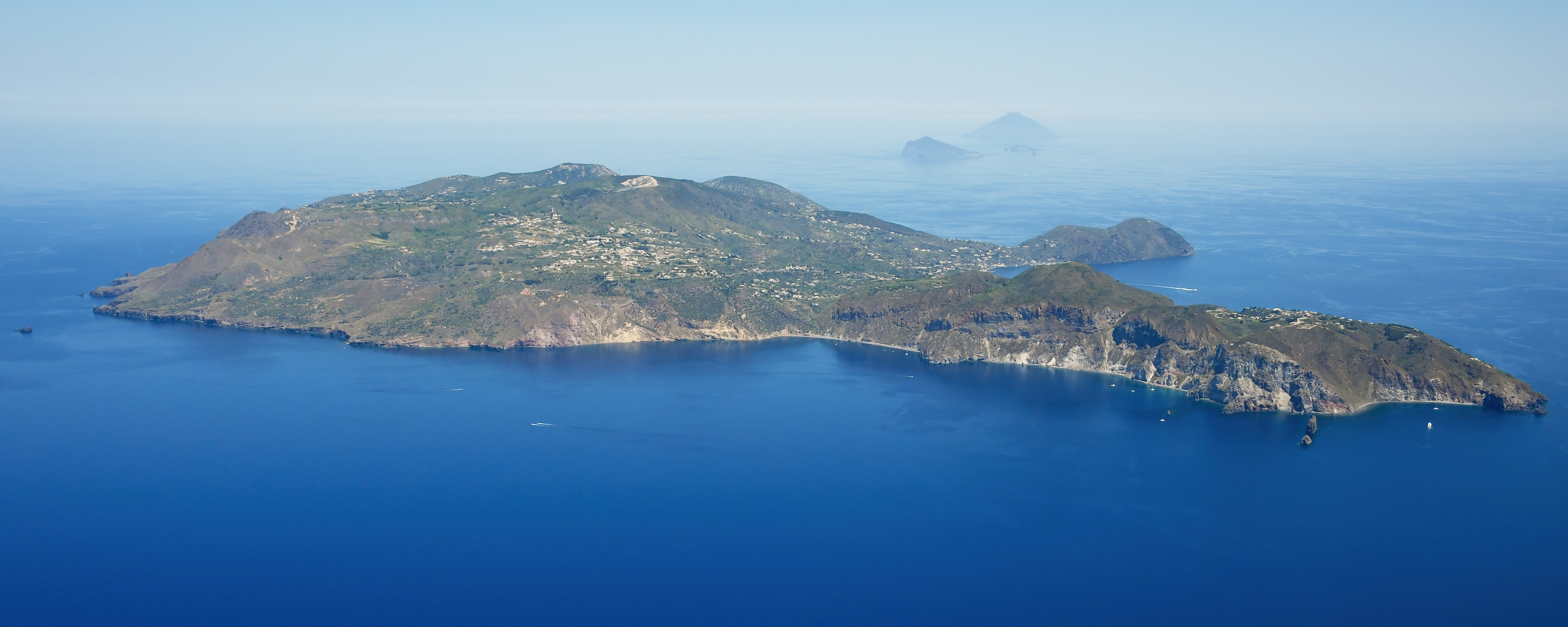
Lipari

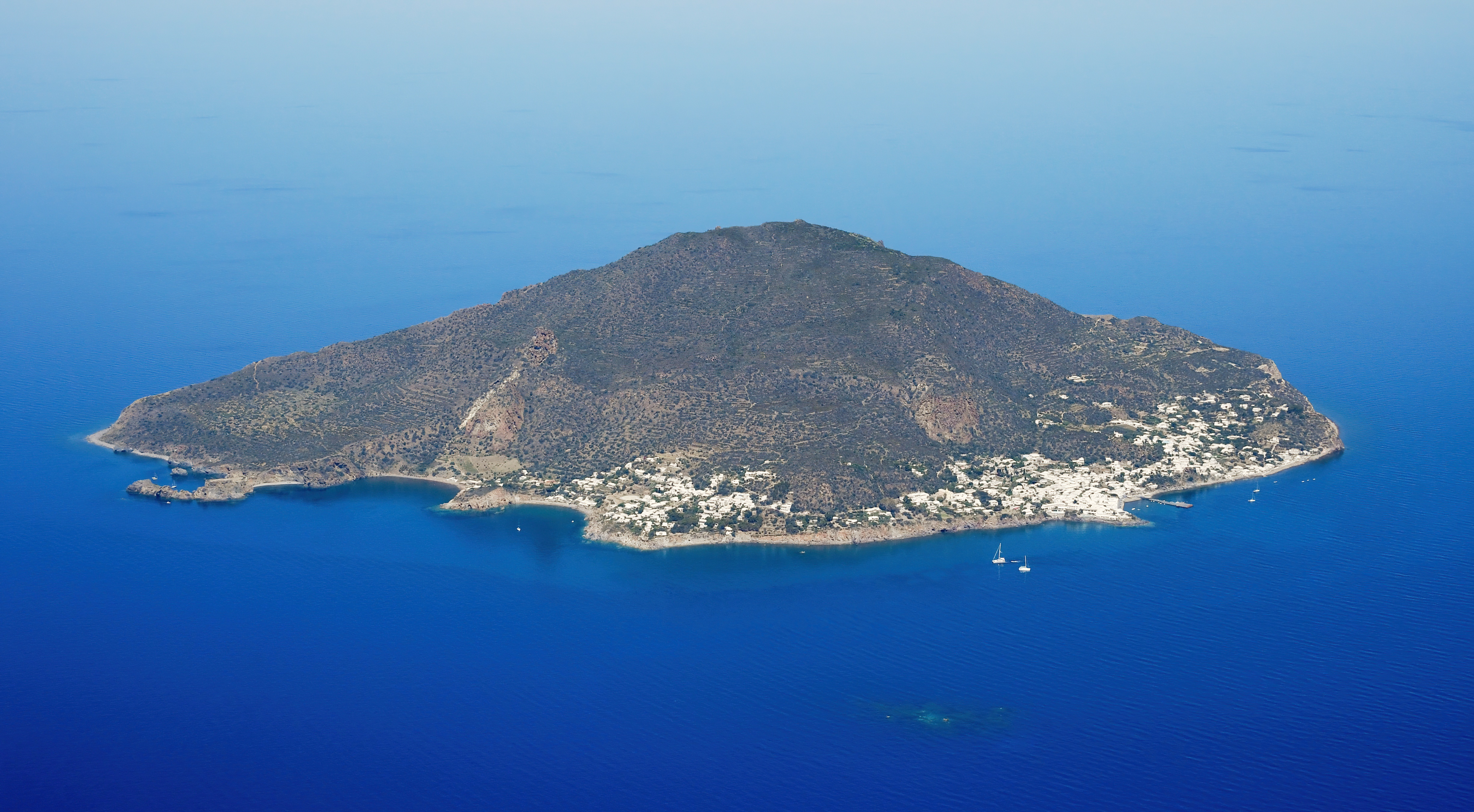
Panarea

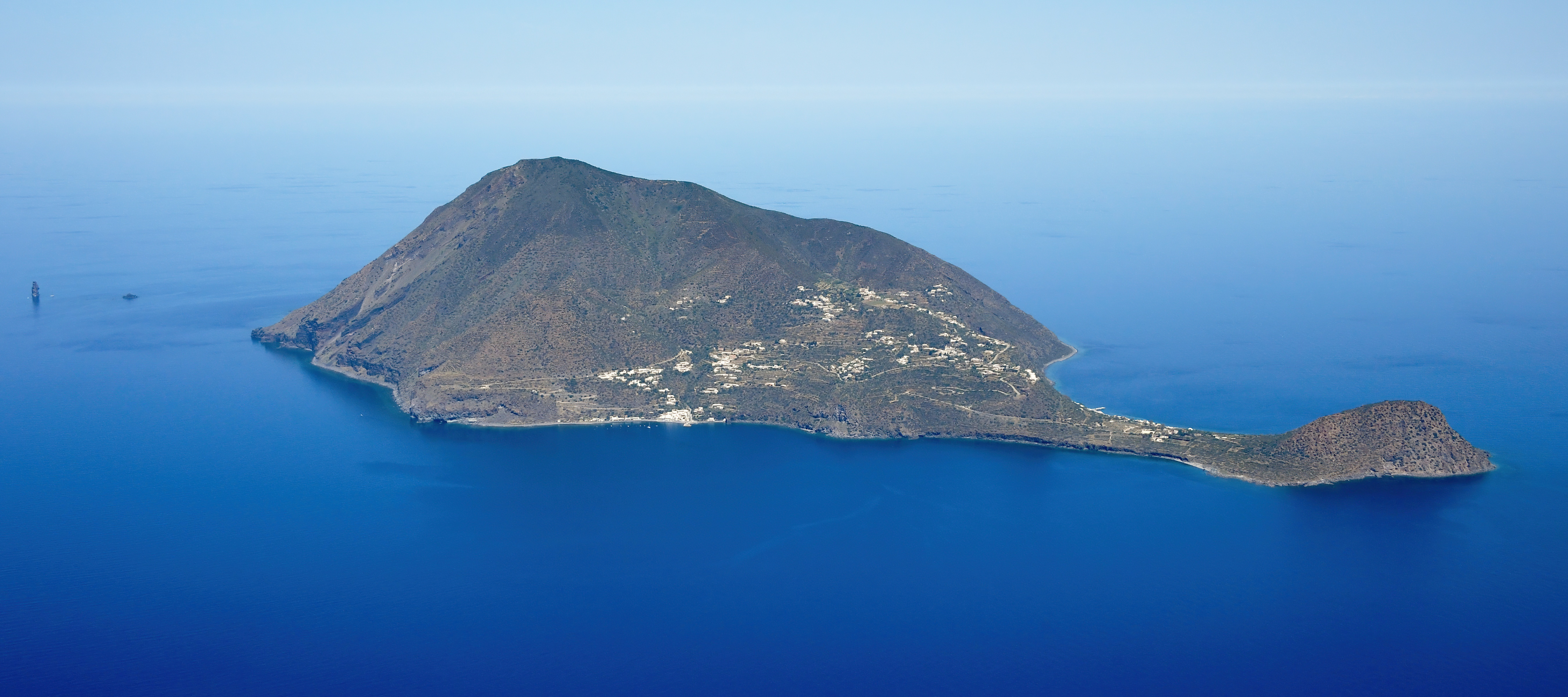
Filicudi

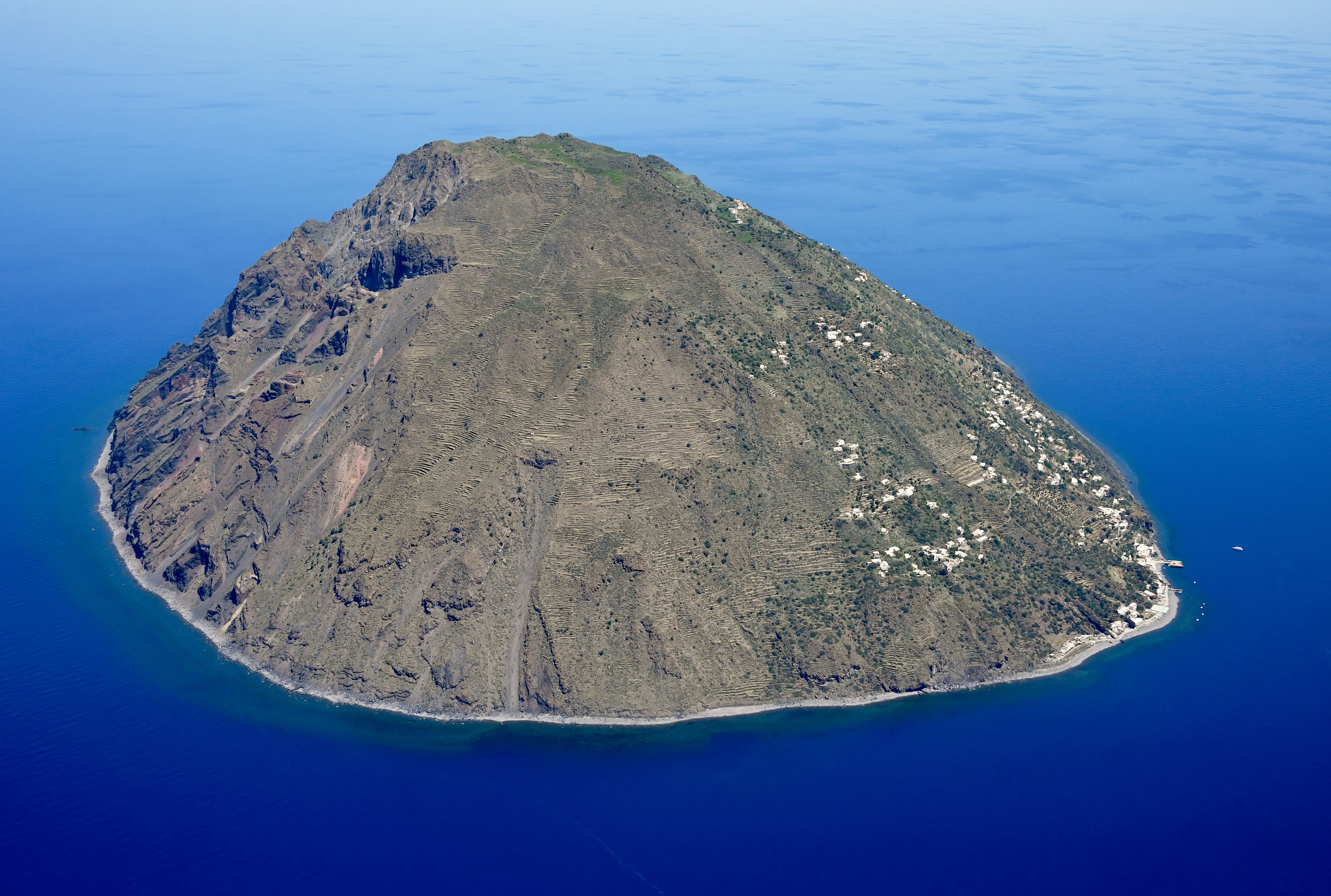
Alicudi

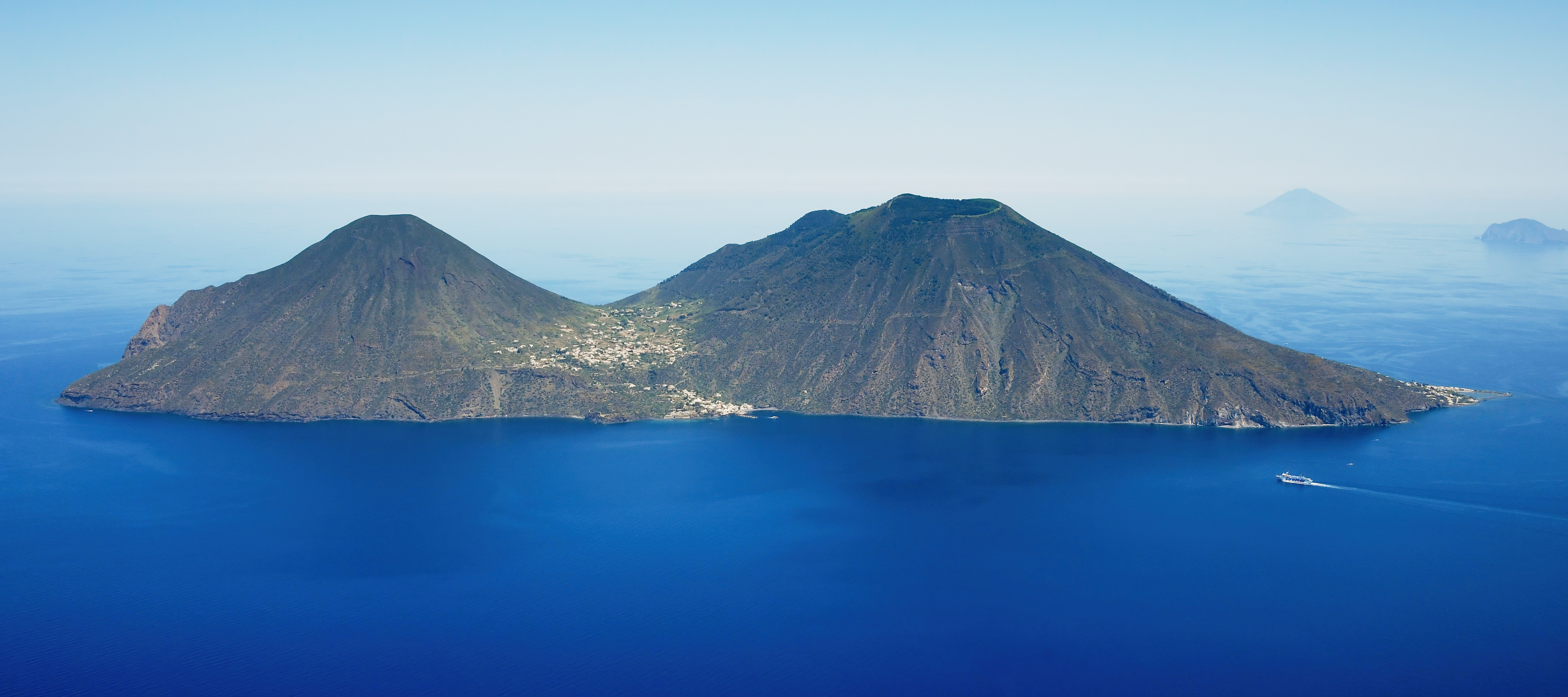
Salina

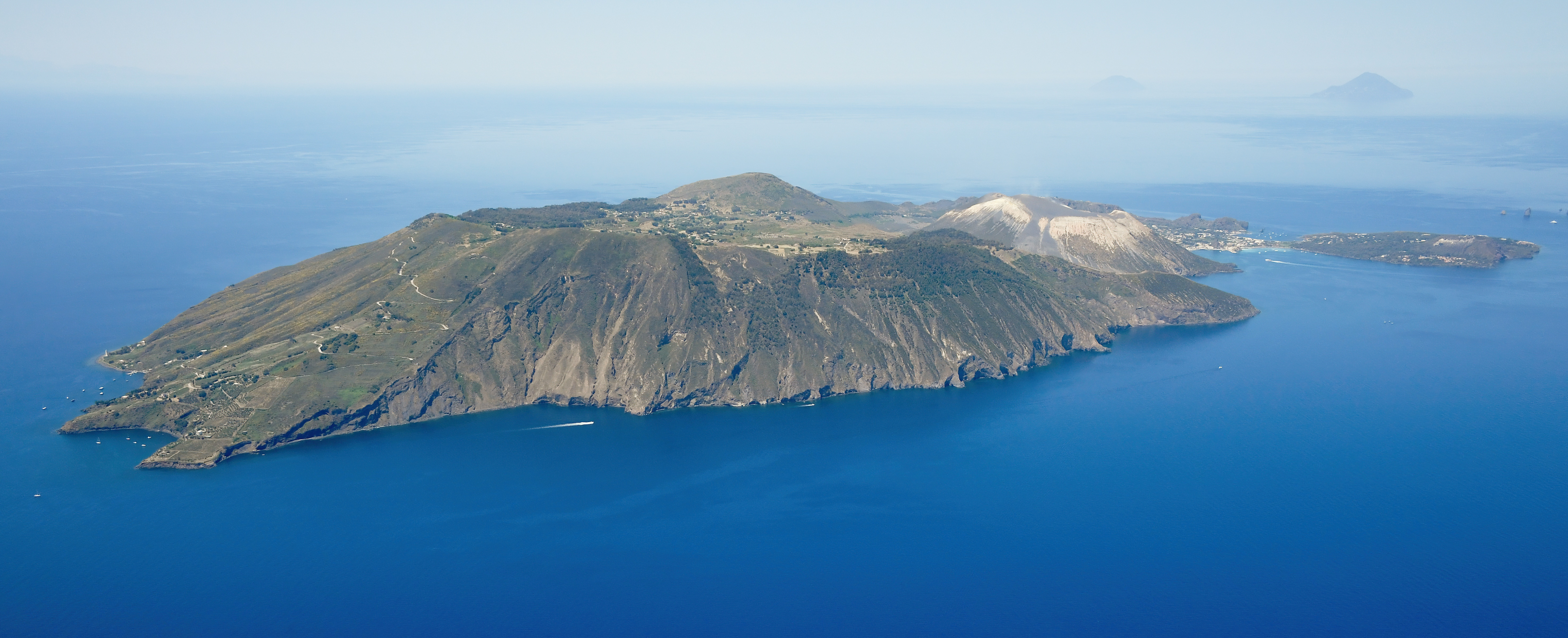
Vulcano

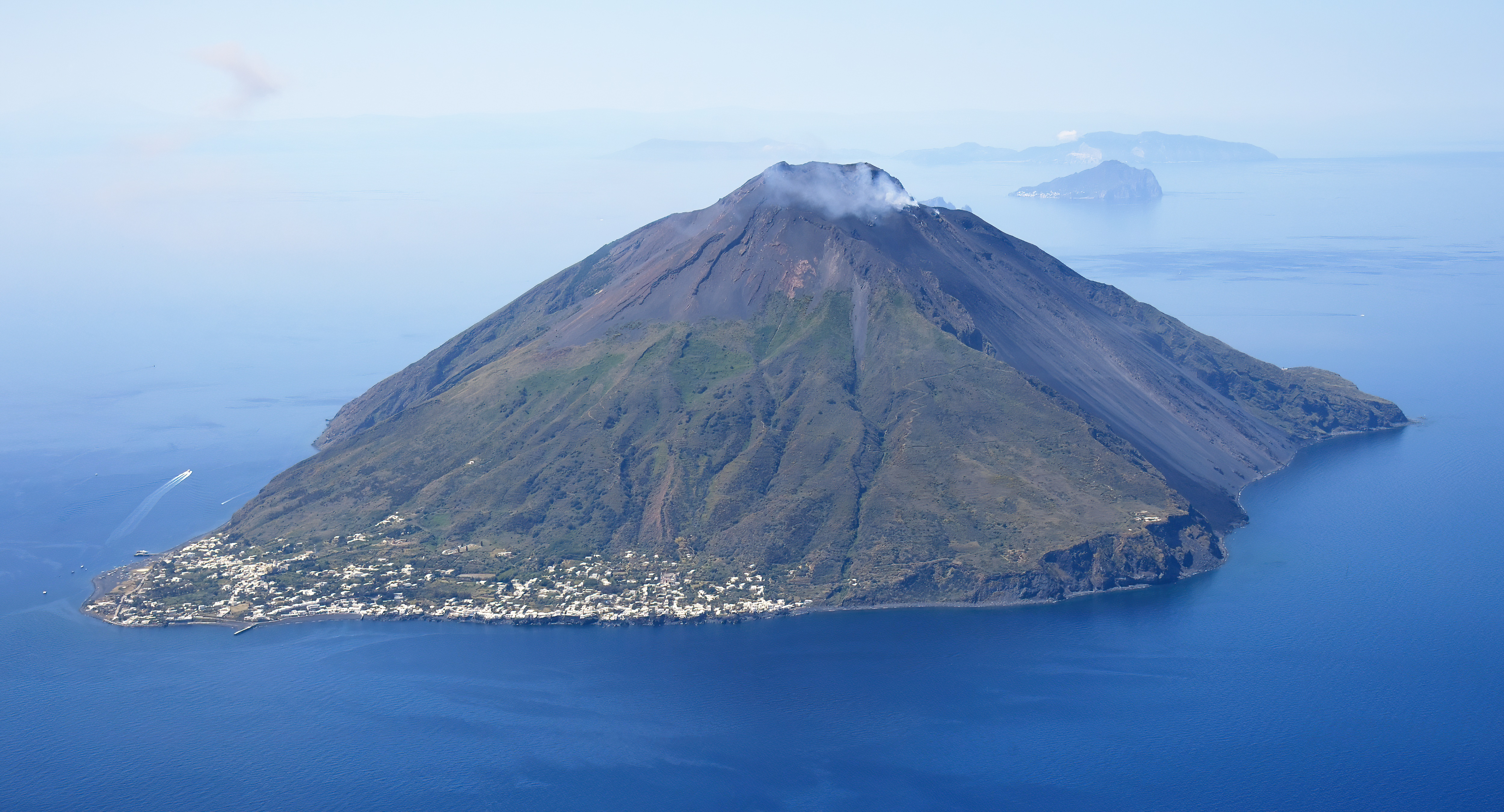
Stromboli

== Administration ==
The islands form part of the Sicilian Metropolitan City of Messina. All the islands except Salina comprise the comune of Lipari within that province; Salina forms three separate comunes: Malfa, Leni and Santa Marina Salina.

Commune	Population
Leni	708
Lipari	11,549
Malfa	1,001
Santa Marina Salina	894

== Architectural control ==
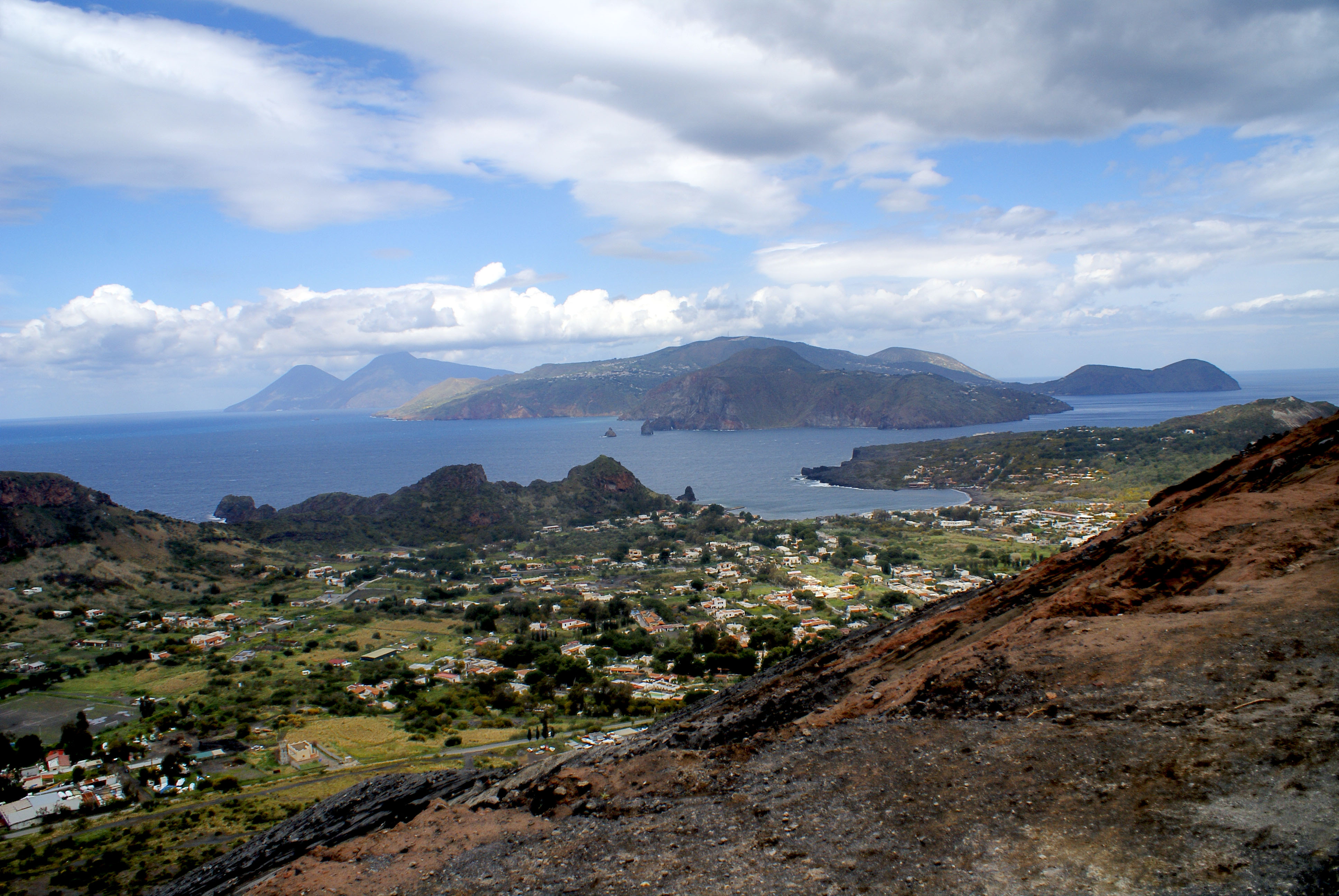
View from Vulcano, Lipari in the middle, Salina at the left, Panarea at the right

Curbing urban development has been a key in preserving the Aeolian islands in a natural state. New buildings are severely restricted. Existing residences can be bought and restored but they must be constructed to resemble its whitewashed houses. Traditional houses consist of modular cubes constructed from indigenous building materials like stone, lava, pumice, and tufo. Almost all houses have a huge outdoor terrace, usually shaded by grape and flowering vines.

== Mythology ==
In Homer's epic poem, the Odyssey, Aeolus, son of Hippotes, was the divine keeper of the winds and king of the mythical, floating island of Aeolia. He kept the violent winds locked safely away inside the interior of his isle, releasing them only at the command of greater gods to wreak devastation upon the world.

The hero of the epic poem, Odysseus, on his travels to return home from Troy, visited Aeolus' isle and was entrusted with a bag containing all of the winds to ensure a safe voyage home. However, during the trip, the hero's companions opened the bag and the escaping winds carried their ship all the way back to Aeolus' shore.

== History ==
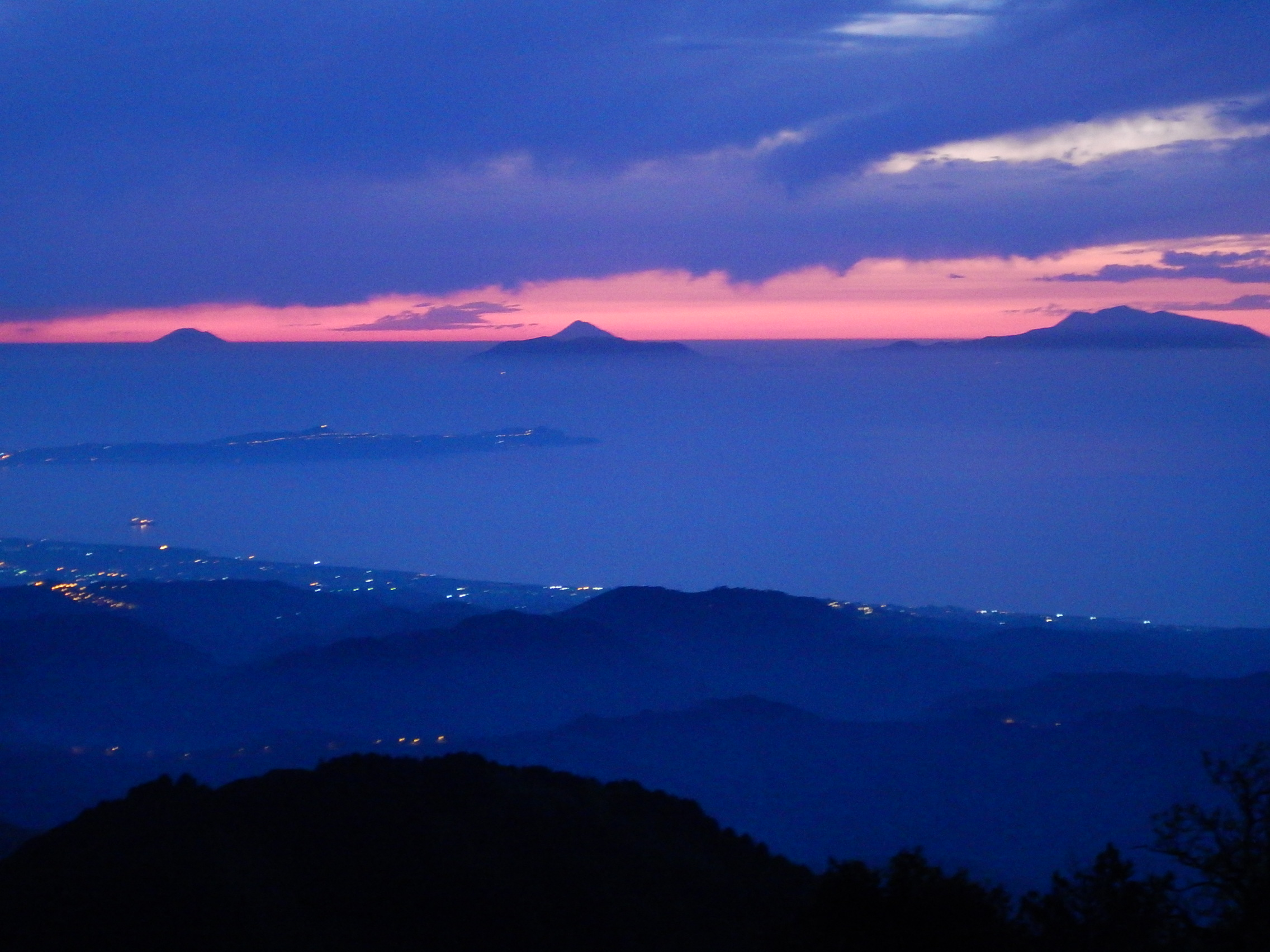
Sunset at the Aeolian Islands seen from mount Dinnammare, in the Peloritani range.

=== 4000–2500 BC ===
The first evidence of Sicilian migration was in Lipari (Castellaro Vecchio culture). The manufacture and commerce of obsidian objects was highly developed until the introduction of metals.

=== 1600–1250 BC ===
During the Bronze Age, the Aeolians prospered by means of maritime commerce in an area which extended from Mycenae to the British Isles, from where tin was imported. Villages on the Aeolian islands flourished on Capo Graziano (Filicudi), Castello (Lipari), Serro dei Cianfi (Salina), Capo Milazzese (Panarea), and Portella (Salina). All these settlements were destroyed by new Italic invasions in 1250 BC.

=== 1240–850 BC ===
According to Diodorus Siculus, the Aeolian Islands were occupied by the Ausones led by Liparus. Liparus was succeeded by Aeolus whose house, according to the Odyssey by Homer, gave hospitality to Odysseus.

=== 600–300 BC ===
In 580 BC, Greeks exiled from Rhodes and Knidos landed at Lipari and began a period of Greek domination, which was known for acts of piracy against Etruscan and Phoenician shipping. There was production of vases and other ceramics.

=== 300 BC–AD 250 ===
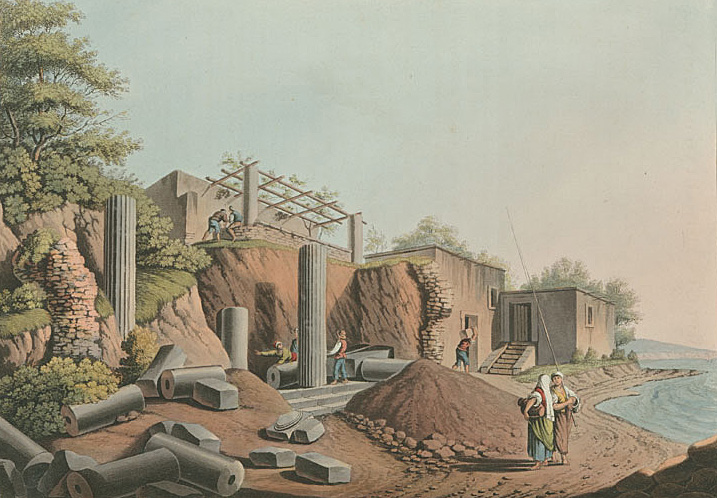
Ancient temple in Salina, 1810

The islanders were allies of the Carthaginians against Rome during the Punic Wars. Although the Battle of the Lipari Islands in 260 BC led to a Carthaginian victory, the Romans later sacked Lipari and their domination led to a period of poverty.

=== AD 250–1000 ===
At the fall of the Western Roman Empire, the Aeolian Islands came under the sway of the Visigoths, the Vandals and the Ostrogoths, followed by the domination of the Byzantine Empire. According to a Christian legend, in 264 a coffin which contained the body of Bartholomew washed up on the beach of Lipari, with the result that Bartholomew was immediately elected the patron saint of the Aeolian Islands. In 836 the Aghlabids of Ziyadat Allah I of Ifriqiya sacked Lipari, massacred most of the population, enslaved the survivors and annexed the Liparian Islands into the Emirate of Sicily.

=== 1000–1600 ===
The Norman conquest of Sicily from the Emirate of Sicily in 1061 resulted in the annexation of the islands. Roger II of Sicily sent the Benedictine monks to Lipari, which gave rise to considerable development on the islands. A cathedral dedicated to Saint Bartholomew was built, as well as the Benedictine monastery in the castle. In 1208 Frederick II of Swabia acceded to the throne of the Kingdom of Sicily. The period of prosperity which followed, ended with the domination of the Angevins and the rebellion of the Sicilians which culminated in the revolt of the Sicilian Vespers. The Aeolians however, remained loyal to Charles of Anjou, and commercial links were established with Naples, the capital of the Angevin kingdom. In 1337 Lipari opened its gates to the French fleet without resistance, and in return obtained various commercial and fiscal benefits. In the mid-15th century, Naples and Palermo united into the Kingdom of the Two Sicilies under the crown of Alfonso V of Aragon.

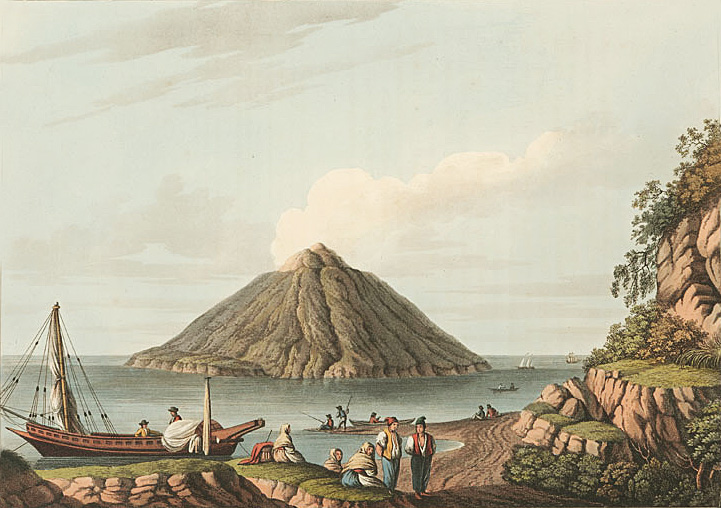
Stromboli in 1810, painted by Luigi Mayer

On June 30, 1544, a fleet of 180 Ottoman vessels under the command of the corsair Hayreddin Barbarossa occupied Lipari and laid siege to the castle. The defenders surrendered. Historically, it is said around 9,000 of the 10,000 citizens of Lipari were captured and enslaved although a couple of more recent scholars have questioned this number arguing for a lower population at the time of Barbarossa. A number of citizens were ransomed in Messina and returned to the islands but most of those captured never returned. Only after the tragedy did the Spanish authorities turn their attention to Lipari and repopulate the city with Sicilian, Calabrian and Spanish families. The city walls and houses were rebuilt and an Aeolian fleet was constructed which was able to successfully defend the Tyrrhenian Sea from the Ottomans.

=== 1600–present ===
In 1693, an earthquake destroyed all the towns in eastern Sicily, causing around 60,000 deaths. After the population invoked the protection of Saint Bartholomew during prayers in the cathedral, there was not a single victim on the Aeolian Islands. The economic conditions of the islands improved greatly during the 17th century with agricultural progress (malvasia grapes), capers, and a variety of fruit, vegetables and fishing). With the Bourbons came the introduction of criminal and political prisoners to the islands. In 1916, the penal colony was closed, but the Fascist regime unsuccessfully tried to reopen it in 1926. The island population reacted by pulling down the remains of the ex-penitentiary in the castle. However, not long after, the castle was converted to accommodate anti-Fascist political prisoners in enforced exile. Liparians fraternised with these exiles until the Allies' liberation. After the war, the same room that had housed the opponents of Fascism became the Aeolian Archaeological Museum.

Towards the end of the 19th century, the Aeolian Islands were visited by Archduke Ludwig Salvator of Austria—a friend of the islands and also a man with a profound knowledge of the archipelago. Between the years 1893–96 he published a work of eight volumes on the Aeolian Islands.

In August 1888, the crater named Fossa on Vulcano erupted and caused many deaths in the sulphur mines. The eruptions continued for 19 months.

On New Year's Day in 1909, a rumour appeared in international newspapers that the Aeolian Islands had been "swallowed up by the sea" during a time of volcanic activity. While communication with the islands was interrupted for a time, they were not otherwise inconvenienced.

During World War II, all of the Aeolian Islands were captured by the Allies in August 1943, during the invasion of Sicily. The islands were then extensively searched by archeologists Madeleine Cavalier and Luigi Bernabò Brea after World War II.

== UNESCO World Heritage Sites ==
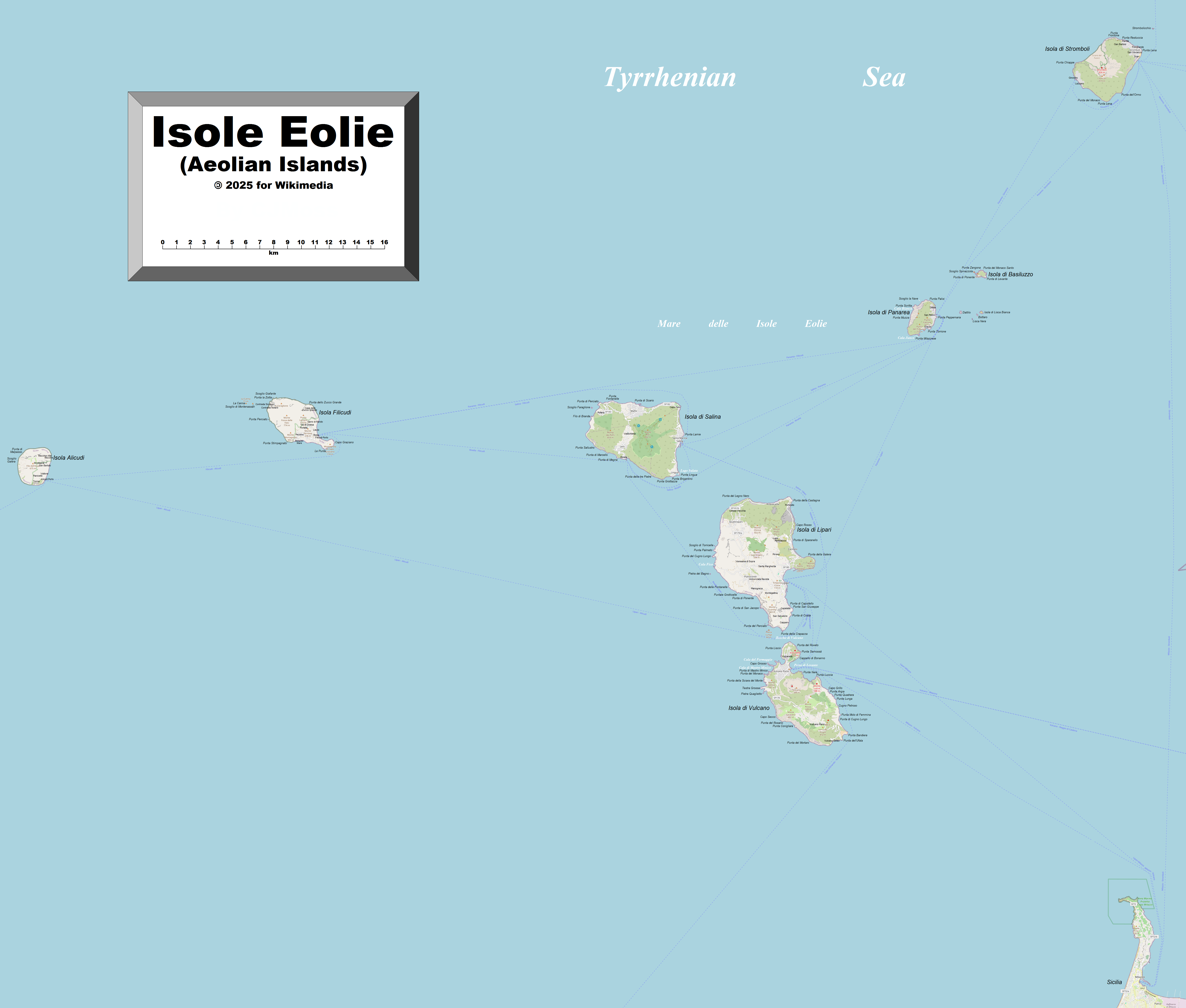
Detailed map of the Aeolian Islands

The Aeolian Islands were listed by UNESCO in 2000 as a World Heritage Site for providing "an outstanding record of volcanic island-building and destruction, and ongoing volcanic phenomena". Status as a World Heritage Site was threatened by Italy's failure to close the pumice quarry as well as its failure to prevent the building of 4 new harbours. However, as of 2020, it is still listed by UNESCO as a World Heritage site.

== See also ==
- List of islands of Italy
