= Malfa =

- Comune
- Comune di Malfa
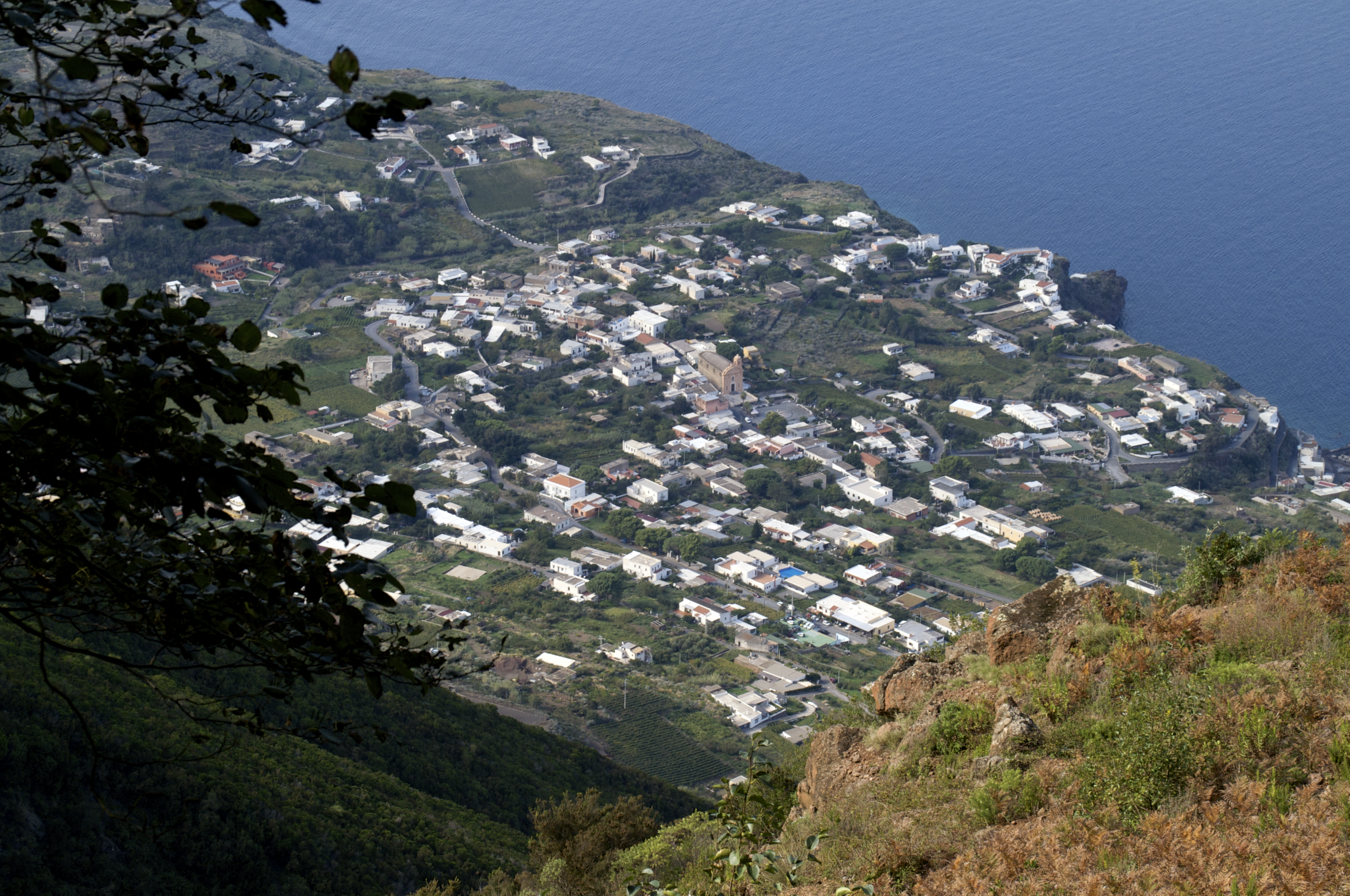
- View of Malfa from Mount Rivi

- Coat of arms

- Location within Italy Location within Sicily
- Coordinates: 38°35′N 14°50′E
- Country: Italy
- Region: Sicily
- Metropolitan city: Messina (ME)
- Frazioni: Pollara, Capo Faro

Government
  - Mayor: Clara Rametta

Area
  - Total: 8.74 km^{2} (3.37 sq mi)
- Elevation: 100 m (330 ft)

Population (2026)
  - Total: 1,003
  - Density: 115/km^{2} (297/sq mi)
- Demonym: Malfitani
- Time zone: UTC+1 (CET)
  - Summer (DST): UTC+2 (CEST)
- Postal code: 98050
- Dialing code: 090
- Website: Official website

Malfa is a town and comune (municipality) on the island of Salina, one of the Aeolian Islands, in the Metropolitan City of Messina in the autonomous island region of Sicily in southern Italy. It is located about 140 kilometres (87 mi) northeast of Palermo and about 80 kilometres (50 mi) northwest of Messina. It has 1,003 inhabitants.

The island of Salina is greenest and second largest of the seven islands in the archipelago. The main economic activities are agriculture, tourism and fishing. Cultivated products are grapes, capers, olives, figs and pricklypears.

== Etymology ==
Malfa derived its name from Amalfi, after some families from that city established here during the 12th century.

== Demographics ==
As of 2026, the population is 1,003, of which 51.9% are male, and 48.1% are female. Minors make up 14.1% of the population, and seniors make up 24.0%.

Historical population

Year	Pop.	±%
1861	2,159	—
1871	1,715	−20.6%
1881	2,034	+18.6%
1901	1,659	−18.4%
1911	1,449	−12.7%
1921	1,366	−5.7%
1931	1,362	−0.3%
1936	1,304	−4.3%

Year	Pop.	±%
1951	1,187	−9.0%
1961	1,072	−9.7%
1971	762	−28.9%
1981	823	+8.0%
1991	871	+5.8%
2001	851	−2.3%
2011	988	+16.1%
2021	978	−1.0%

Source: ISTAT

During the 20th century, many Malfitani migrated to Australia and to a lesser number to the United States.

=== Immigration ===
As of 2025, immigrants make up 14.5% of the population. The 5 largest foreign countries of birth are Morocco, Romania, France, Poland, and Ukraine.

== Culture ==
Malfa celebrates the festival of San Lorenzo (Patron Saint of Malfa) on 10 August each year, with a street parade, music and fireworks.

== Economy ==
Malfa is a production and exporting center of Malvasia white wine. The fertile soil produces capers for export.

== In popular culture ==
The movie The Postman, Massimo Troisi's last one, was filmed in the frazione of Pollara.
