= 2002 Stromboli tsunami =

Italian tsunami

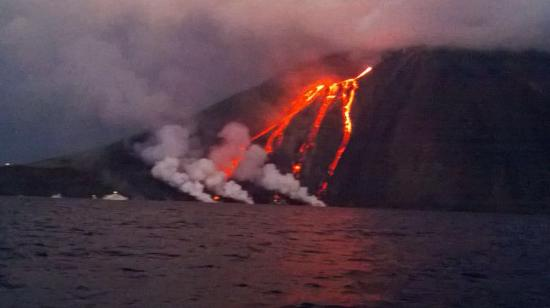
- Eruption of the Stromboli Volcano
- UTC time: 2002-12-30 12:15
- Local date: 30 December 2002
- Local time: 13:15 UTC+1
- Duration: Around 7 minutes
- Depth: 10-1000 (m)
- Epicenter: 38°47′38″N 15°12′40″E
- Type: Volcanic tsunami
- Total damage: €600,000
- Tsunami: 20 m (66 ft)
- Landslides: 70 m (230 ft)
- Casualties: None

The 2002 Stromboli tsunami was caused by a volcanic eruption in the Aeolian Islands of Sicily, located on the Tyrrhenian Sea. In May 2002, one of the island's two active volcanoes, Stromboli, entered a new phase of explosive activity, initially characterized by gas and ash emissions from the summit craters. On 30 December 2002, the seismic network recorded two large collapses of a huge portion of the Sciara del Fuoco, which resulted in tsunamis. The first landslide occurred at 13:15, and the second around 13:23; both lasted 5–7 minutes. The event caused damage on the eastern coast of Stromboli and Panarea. These tsunamis have been considered the most violent ones to have struck Stromboli in the past 100 years.

== History ==
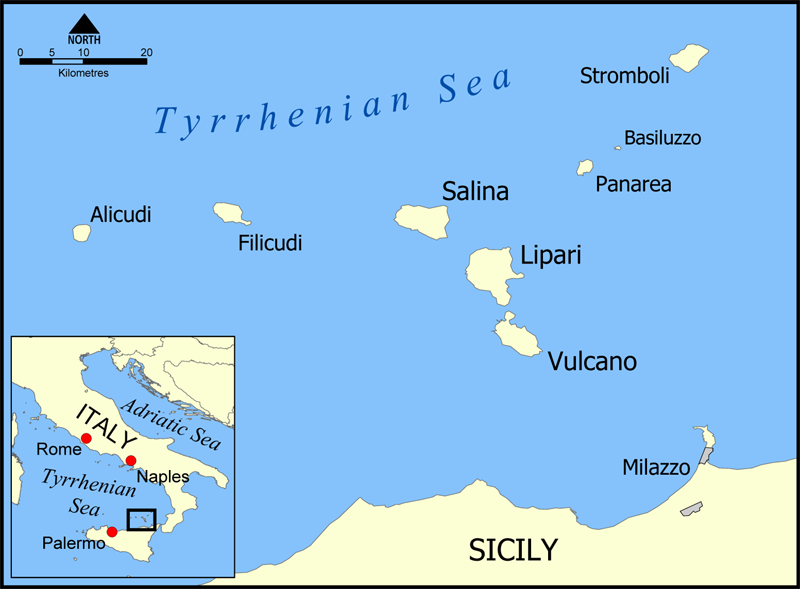
Aeolian Islands map.

Significant phenomena affected Stromboli during its fifth life cycle between 13,000 and 4000 BP (Neostromboli). After the major eruptive phase ended about 7500–7000 years ago, the volcano was affected by massive collapses, until it reached its maximum expansion in the northern sector, a period which lasted 3000 years. These were the most recent landslides, which led to the formation of the Sciara del Fuoco, a steep slope formed by lava, lapillus, and incandescent waste, which descends from the crater of Stromboli (750 m; 2,460 ft above sea level) to the sea.

Starting in May 2002, Stromboli was characterized by explosive activity at 100m above the summit craters. In November, the level of the lava in the craters was very high, resulting in an overflow in the upper part of the Sciara del Fuoco, which increased Strombolian activity and caused several explosions in early December. The heights of ejecta were intense at Crater 1. Afterwards, it reached 200 m (660 ft) above Crater 1, and the explosions left magma close to the crater's rim. At local time 18.30 (UTC+1) on 28 December, an unusual activity characterized by a 300 m (980 ft) long eruptive break occurred, causing the break of the northern wall of Crater 1, displacing part of the Sciara del Fuoco wall. The lava flows were steep: two came out from the base, and one from the middle of the break. It covered a 400 m (1,300 ft) unstable surface. The first flow reached the sea, which was about 1.1 km (0.68 mi) away, in 30 minutes. Significant volcanic activity changes did not occur, but a volcanic tremor started to increase. 12 hours later, two new gaps opened at about 500 and 600 m (1,600 and 2,000 ft) high, causing the start of two lava flows.

In the morning of 29 December, the lava flows along the Sciara del Fuoco were no longer fueled and two horizontal cracks opened on the surface, which was evidence of the continuous failure. On 30 December, the two gaps at 500 m and 600 m were being fueled once more, so lava flows started again. These flows went along the 28 December cracks while cutting through them. There was only ash emission, but it was not provoked by explosive activity—it was caused by frictional sliding. This revealed the concept of their formation, which began at 500 m at the eastern wall of the Sciara del Fuoco and continued down the slope. 20 minutes later, new breaks opened on the west side at about 500 m, which defined the border of the upcoming landslides that formed a few hours later. The gaps were filled with a mass of rock, probably because of the differences in the rocks in the middle, which caused the two rock's part failure that provoked two different landslides. The first part crashed into the sea at 13:14:05 and the second one at 13:22:38. These caused two tsunamis that struck Panarea Island, which is 20 km (12 mi) away from Stromboli. They took 6–7 minutes to reach it, and it was visible for 10 seconds. That was the first time a tsunami had been recorded on the island. Many minor landslides and collapses occurred, resulting in 6–8 Hz frequency content.

== Causes ==
On 30 December 2002, a part of the Sciara del Fuoco collapsed, causing a land movement of 18 million cubic meters of material. The wall detachment occurred in two phases: first, the landslide occurred in the submerged part of the Sciara del Fuoco, and later it spread to the surface.

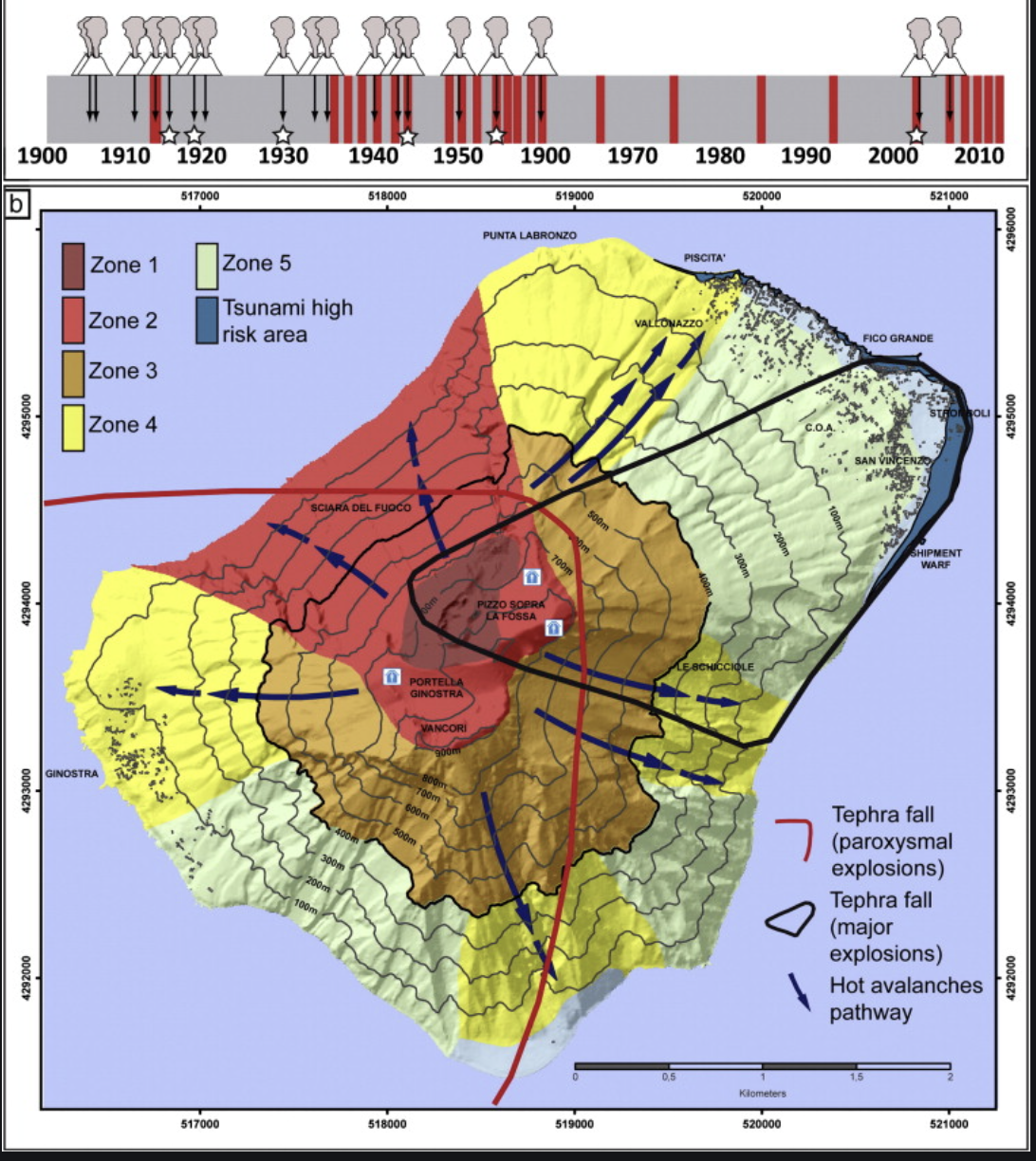
Structure of the Stromboli volcano.

The north-west side of the island is the result of the filling by the products of volcanic activity; a depression created as a result of multiple collapses of the same side occurred, according to recent studies. The landslides that produced the waves resulted from a sequence of deep movements (up to 70 m) involving the northeast sector of the subaerial and submarine side of the Sciara after the beginning of the volcanic eruptions on 28 December. The complex evolution that led to the destructive landslides of 30 December 2002 was reconstructed by group of researchers from the Sapienza University of Rome, the University of Bologna, the INGV-Section of Catania, and the Institute of Environmental Geology and Geoengineering of the CNR in a special study aimed at assessing the evolution of the stability conditions on behalf of the Civil Protection Department, following the strong changes in morphological conditions produced by the intense erosive and effusive activity of Stromboli. A decisive contribution to the analysis of the phenomena came from the work carried out by the research group members in the months before the events. They were involved in two projects of the National Volcanology Group, in which detailed surveys of the morphology of emerged and submerged slopes and studies on the stability of the slopes were carried out. These surveys were compared with those carried out in the days following the landslides of 30 December and integrated with the analysis of aerial photos following the landslide and with helicopter photos acquired during the sequence of the various phenomena of instability that followed the eruption. These data were used to analyse the backward stability of the slope that gave the first clues about the triggering mechanisms. Thus, it was possible to reconstruct the dynamics of the events. This reconstruction highlighted the fundamental role of the magma intrusion on the slope during the types of volcanic eruptions, which triggered the first deep movements of the north-east sector of the Sciara slope at least one day before the destructive landslide events, and of the instability of the submarine portion of the slope, from which the subsequent landslides propagated upstream.

== Timing ==
The seismograms recorded by the seismic stations installed in Stromboli and in Panarea provide time values that fit the scientific standards and are therefore of high reliability. Equally reliable is the time read in the sea level, recorded by the tide-gauge installed in the port of Panarea. From sources recorded by the seismic stations, it is evident that the two main landslides detached at 13:15 and at 13:22–13:23 local time and that the tsunamis hit north Panarea around 13:20 and 13:27, arriving at the Panarea harbor between 13:19 and 13:24.

== Economic and cultural impact ==
Stromboli is an active volcano whose persistent activity is considered mid-intensity explosive, occurring every 10 to 20 minutes. The presence of an active volcano in the Aeolian Islands attracts many people to visit the islands. Instead of discouraging tourists, the powerful activity of the volcano has attracted people to witness spectacular volcanic explosions and has increased the Island's economy. To manage and balance safety with the tourism-based economy, Stromboli has developed a safety guide for hiking trails and a handbook full of information related to the island, to behave in the best way during emergency situations. The greatest danger of the Stromboli eruptions is linked to the risk of tsunamis and the unpredictability of volcanic activity, which, although classified as "low-energy", is uninterrupted and can trigger devastating events.

== Aftermath ==
=== Results ===
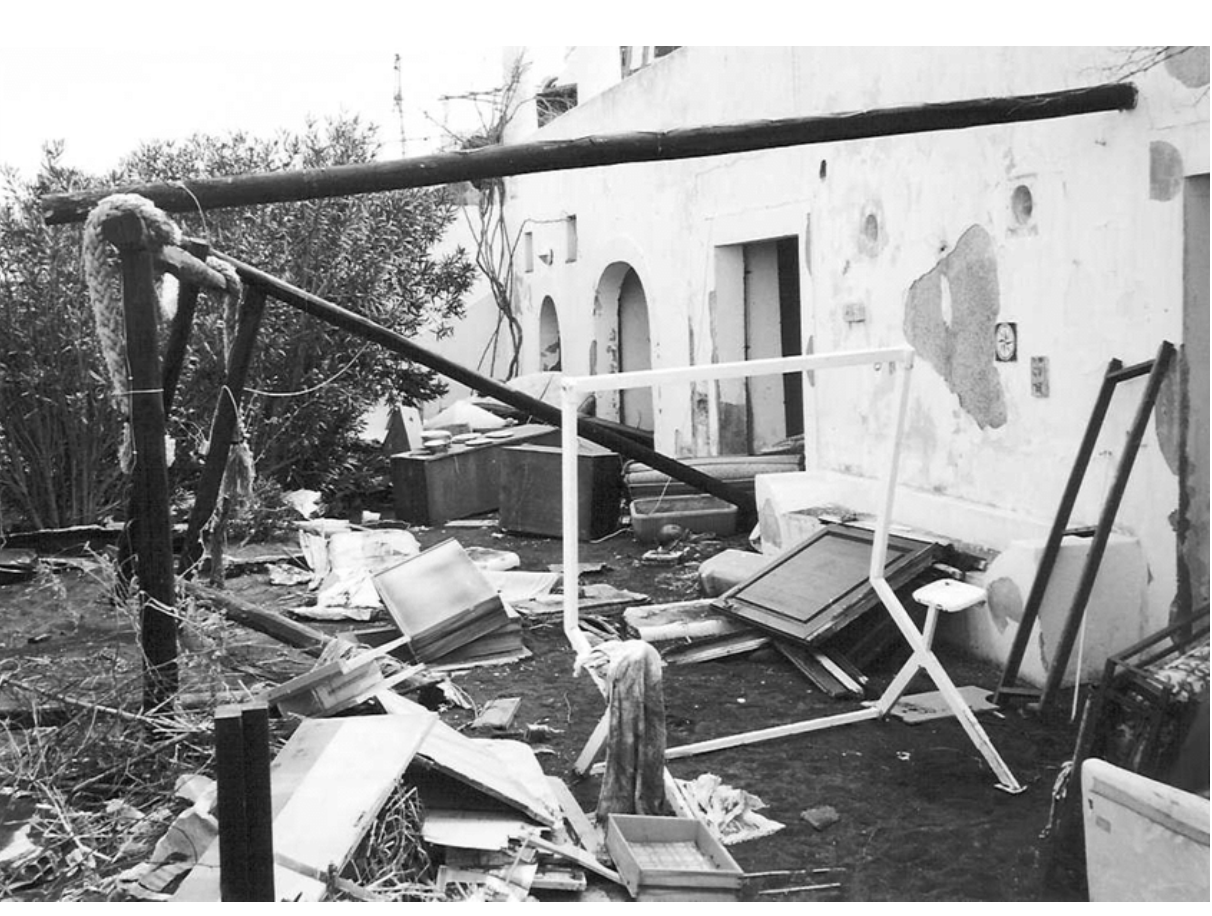
Effects in a building after the tsunami of 2002, Stromboli.

On 30 December, two days after the start of the effusion phase, there was a partial collapse of one side of the volcano involved in the lava flow. The landslide event also affected submarine portions of the Sciara del Fuoco and caused a tidal wave whose maximum height was simulated around 10 m, the well-known tsunami of December 2002. The eruption lasted until the end of March, with small variations in the flow rate of lava and the positions of the eruptive mouths, with reduced or no explosive activity in the craters. Between the end of March and the beginning of April, the flow rate of the fluxes showed a significant decrease, and weak signals associated with small ash explosions observed in the crater area began to be recorded. On 5 April, at 8:12 AM (local time), a strong explosion occurred at the north-east crater. The explosion was followed by the expulsion of lava with the formation of a volcanic cloud characterized by a mushroom shape that reached a height of about 1150 m. The expelled products fell on the flanks of the volcano up to low altitude, causing fires in the vegetation. The effusive activity fed by the mouths, present in the lava field, set at an altitude of 600 m above sea level, continued accompanied by modest explosive activity at the craters, with sporadic explosive episodes of greater energy. Between June and the second half of July, there was a progressive decrease in the flow of lava and a gradual increase in explosive activity. On 21 July, the effusive activity was exhausted while the explosive activity started to involve all the craters in the summit area and had the typical characteristics of Strombolian activity with the launch of slag and lapilli. At the beginning of August, the magma was very superficial and the explosions were still low-energy. During the following months, the explosive activity resumed the typical characteristics of normal Strombolian volcanic activity. The first result which was caused by the volcano was an impressive scar which was 800 m deep, whereas on the coast the scar was over 40 m deep. Once the event occurred, the submarine morphology started to evolve quickly due to lava emission and rockfall from the subaerial slope. The development has been rapidly documented by a series of multibeam surveys. Firstly, an estimate of the rock volume involved in the submarine landslide shows that it might have been the origin of the tsunami. One of the reasons for the instability of Sciara del Fuoco is due to the submarine landslide.

=== Damages ===
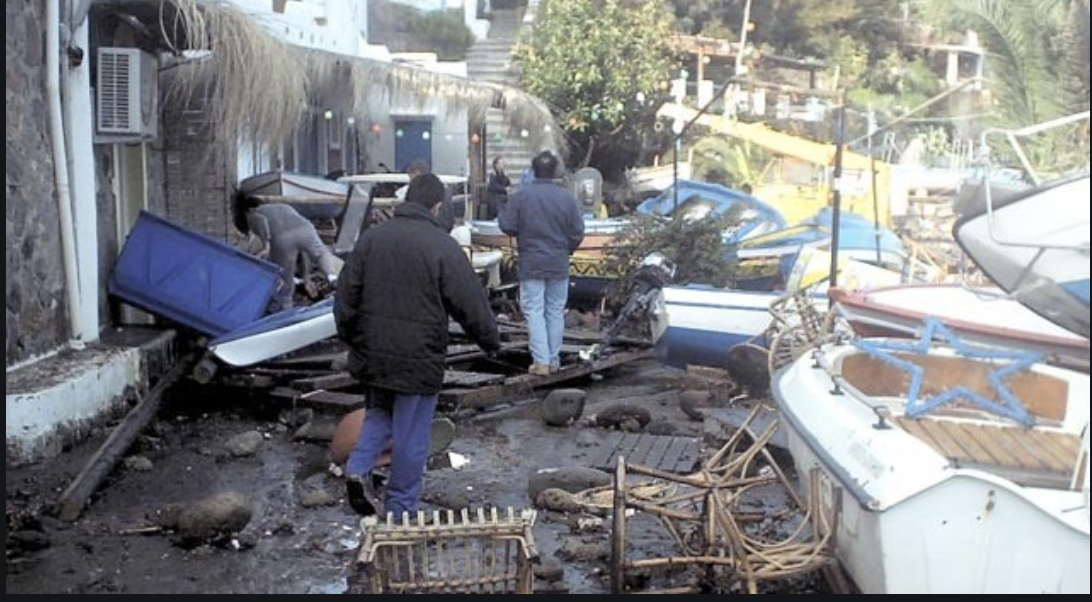
Panarea, January 2003, tsunami effects caused by the eruption of Stromboli.

On the island of Stromboli, the 2002 eruption caused two tsunamis: first, it caused the sea to recede and then provoked two anomalous waves of 20 meters that caused major damage in the Strombolian inhabited area called Ginostra, hitting the whole village. The event also forced the Civil Protection to close the island to tourists until an efficient alarm system against similar phenomena had been tested. No evacuation orders have ever been issued, although most residents preferred to spend the last night of 2002 in a safer environment on the island of Lipari.

The tsunami swept away boats, damaged houses along the coast, and injured six people, who were evacuated by helicopter and brought to two hospitals in Sicily. A tanker was seriously hit by the wave, causing an oil spill. Other minor effects of the giant wave were recorded in the confining Aeolian islands, especially in Panarea. The total damage to the infrastructures of Stromboli, Panarea, and Ginostra was worth €600,000.

=== Casualties and first aid ===
On 30 December 2002, a large amount of rock fell into the sea, causing an anomalous wave; because of it, three people were injured, and two people were transferred to hospitals in Messina. The first one resulted in a fractured leg, the second one a fractured foot, whereas the third injured person was a German citizen who had a slight head cut. Part of the island of Stromboli was evacuated: 100 people were transferred by Civil Protection helicopters to Messina and 40 to Lipari. Two helicopters from the Air Force took part in rescue operations after the event. Since the tsunami occurred in late December, the island was not filled with tourists, and reports of casualties indicate no deaths.

=== National emergency plan history ===
The national emergency planning activities for the Island of Stromboli started in 2003, which saw the participation and involvement of Sicily, the Prefecture – UTG of Messina and the Municipality of Lipari and which ended with the approval, in August 2015, of the "National emergency plan for volcanic events of national importance". The first national planning document was drawn up during the emergency events that affected the island from the end of 2002 to 2003.

=== Risk mitigation ===
The emotional impact of the December 2002 tsunami on public opinion served as a stimulus for initiatives by the National Civil Protection System and local authorities to strengthen standard safety measures and increase prevention and mitigation to deal effectively with future crises. The main initiatives, implemented during the 2003 crisis, consisted of the creation of new geophysical and geochemical volcanic detection networks and a local civil protection structure (AOC, Advanced Operations Centre), where signals from volcanic monitoring are displayed in real-time and possibly used by the staff of the Civil Protection Department (DPC) for the immediate activation of response procedures. In 2005, at the DPC in Rome, the Central Functional Volcanic Risk Centre (CFCRV) was established, where the most relevant monitoring signals of the active volcanoes are displayed in real-time and where simple processing activities are carried out daily, for risk assessment and data sharing within the scientific community, coordinated by civil protection personnel with training in volcanic problems. The response effectiveness of the new system was tested in February and March 2007, when a new volcanic crisis occurred. During this crisis, the DPC coordinated information activities with the media and islanders. The effective management of the crisis consisted of minimizing the risk to people and, at the same time, facilitating normal activities and regular access to the island.

Hotel owners and other tourist facilities were given leaflets and additional information, which was spread among tourists to increase awareness. Most inhabitants thought that sharing this information with visitors would negatively affect tourism, but it never happened, as Stromboli is still considered a year-round destination for tourists worldwide. Increasing involvement of the local population in civil protection activities led to the establishment of two groups of civil protection volunteers on the island. These two groups took an active part in the tsunami information campaign "Io non Rischio" in 2015 and 2016, which took place in the middle of summer.

== Media coverage ==
After the eruption of December 2002, many newspapers, newscasts and websites, such as la Repubblica, Corriere del Mezzogiorno and Corriere della Sera, reported on the incident. The event was studied by researchers from Sapienza University of Rome, the University of Bologna, the INGV-Section of Catania, and the Institute of Environmental Geology and Geoengineering of the CNR.

=== Data collection and processing ===
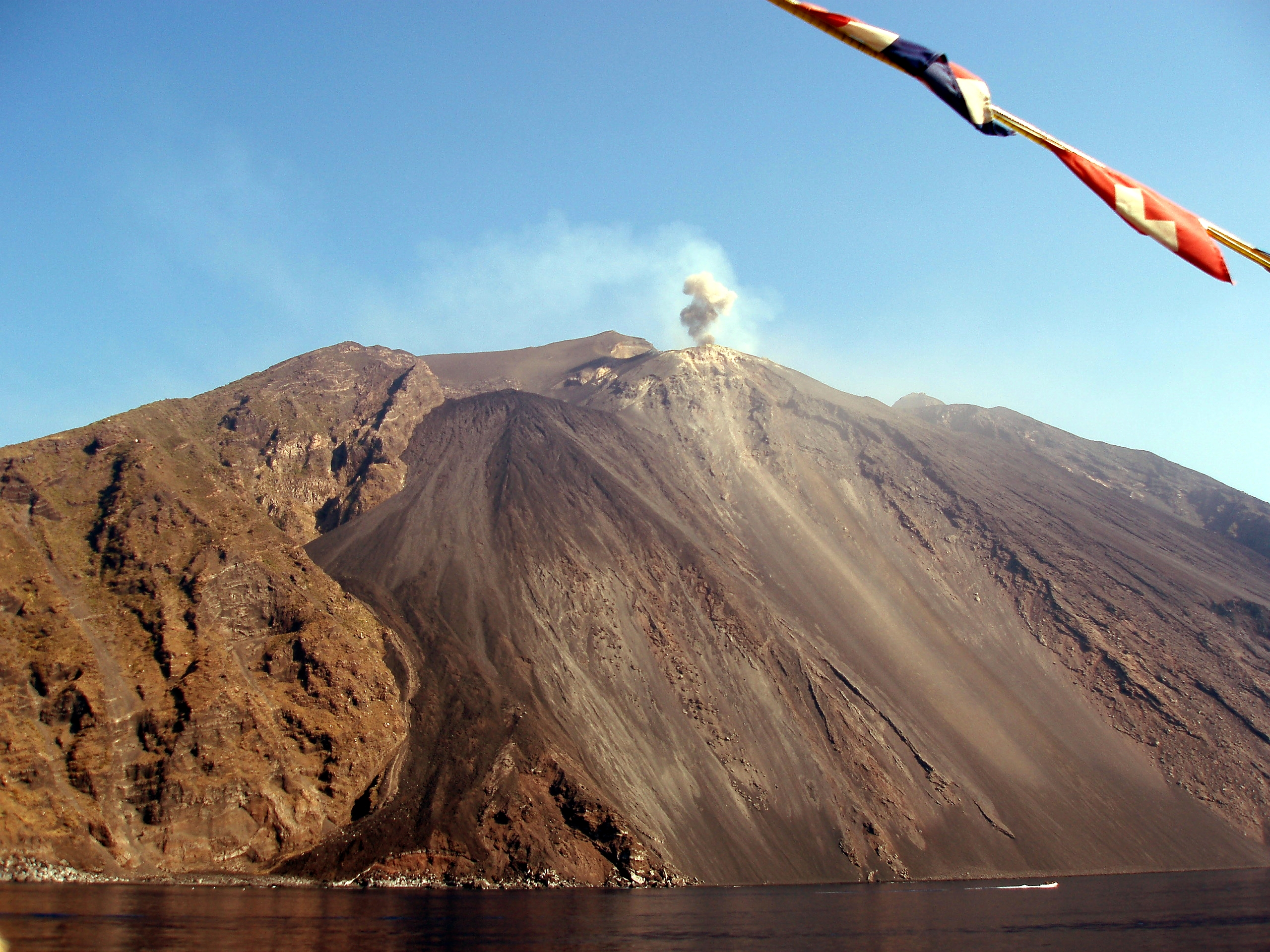
Eruption of Stromboli by day, 2006.

In front of the Sciara del Fuoco slope, an initial survey was conducted a week after the event. The results obtained varied from about 1 meter in shallow water to around 5 meters in deep water. In order to improve the precision and resolution of the final results, additional data acquisition techniques and nonstandard processing were applied. Different grids were used for different depth ranges, but also tinning (which is a triangular irregular network) and random points visualization were performed when the maximum resolution was required.

The data analysis is carried out continuously by an automatic system at the monitoring center of the Vesuvian Observatory, called Eolo. VLP signals require unconventional analysis techniques. The current configuration of the seismic network allows scientists to perform the detection and localization of VLP events with a technique based on a "semblance" analysis. This technique involves rather long calculation times that generally prevent its implementation in real-time monitoring systems. To overcome this problem, Eolo uses parallel calculation methods on clusters and a supercomputer with 132 processors. This allows scientists to perform continuous semblance analysis, automatically locating all the VLP signals generated by Stromboli activity, which in certain periods can exceed 500 events per day, and perform numerous other signal analyses, such as spectrograms, polarization, and Real-time Seismic-Amplitude Measurement (RSAM) for all stations. Eolo has a Web interface that allows access to all information. The system developed for Stromboli has ensured seismic monitoring during the eruptive crises of 2002–2003 and 2007 by providing a large amount of processed data daily. Thanks to its advanced design and the development of new automatic analysis systems, it allows people to obtain, in real time, the maximum information from the acquired data and to highlight its significance.

=== Interviews of witnesses ===
In 2003, people who lived in Stromboli and Panarea were interviewed, though there were few witnesses, as only civil protection authorities and scientists had been allowed into the area. Some witnesses were asked to fill in a questionnaire, which was adopted following the UNESCO post-tsunami survey field guide. 17 eyewitnesses were selected and grouped, based on their geographic location at the time of the events and were asked to have a more detailed interview, either directly by phone or through email. The purpose was to clarify what the witnesses had seen and understand what had happened without being influenced by the interviewer's point of view. The local witnesses agreed on a negative first wave pulse, and one of them affirmed that "a sort of vertical cut" opened in the seawater at the Sciara del Fuoco foot and spread around. Others reported that two sets of tsunami waves reached the coast, even if in two different moments.

== Monitoring systems ==
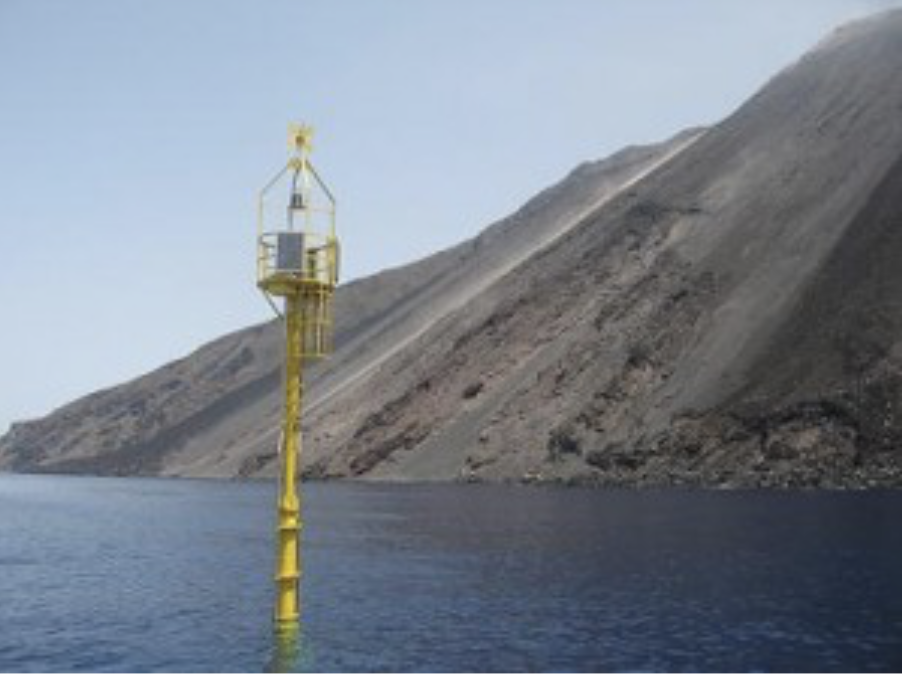
SAR for seismic monitoring, Stromboli, 20 February 2002

=== Elastic beacon ===
The Sciara del Fuoco's stability is monitored by an elastic beacon. Marine surveys occurred offshore of Sciara del Fuoco to monitor the Stromboli submarine slope after the two tsunamis in December 2002. All morphological changes and depositional processes have been studied carefully. Thanks to thirteen surveys in 4 years, it has been possible to reconstruct the morpho-sedimentary evolution of the submarine slope. The scar has been progressively filled with lava; at the beginning, the filling rate was high because of the entrance of lava flows into the sea and the morphological readjustment of the slope; later on, the rate dramatically decreased when the eruption stopped. In February 2007, the scar was already filled by 40%, but then a new type of eruption occurred. The wideband seismic monitoring system of Stromboli volcano has been active since January 2003 and was designed to detect and analyze seismicity related to the eruptive processes taking place on the island. The network consists of 13 digital stations with broadband sensors. The data are acquired from GAIA (INGV – CNT) digital recorders using a 24-bit analog-to-digital converter at a sampling frequency of 50 samples per second per channel. The timing system of these stations is based on the synchronization of the internal clock with the absolute time signal of the Global Positioning System (GPS). Signals are transmitted continuously via radio modem to two different data logging centers. The first is located on the island of Stromboli, at the INGV Observatory of San Vincenzo, and receives signals from the stations on the north side, which are within direct visibility. The second is located in Lipari at the INGV Observatory and receives signals from the stations on the southern side. From Lipari, the signals are sent again to Stromboli at the San Vincenzo Observatory via a TCP/IP connection. The signals of the entire network are then retransmitted to the INGV section in Catania and the Vesuvian Observatory (INGV) in Naples, where they are monitored 24 hours a day by the surveillance staff.

== See also ==
- List of earthquakes in 2002
- List of tsunamis
