= Volcanic landslide =

Mass movement that occurs at volcanoes

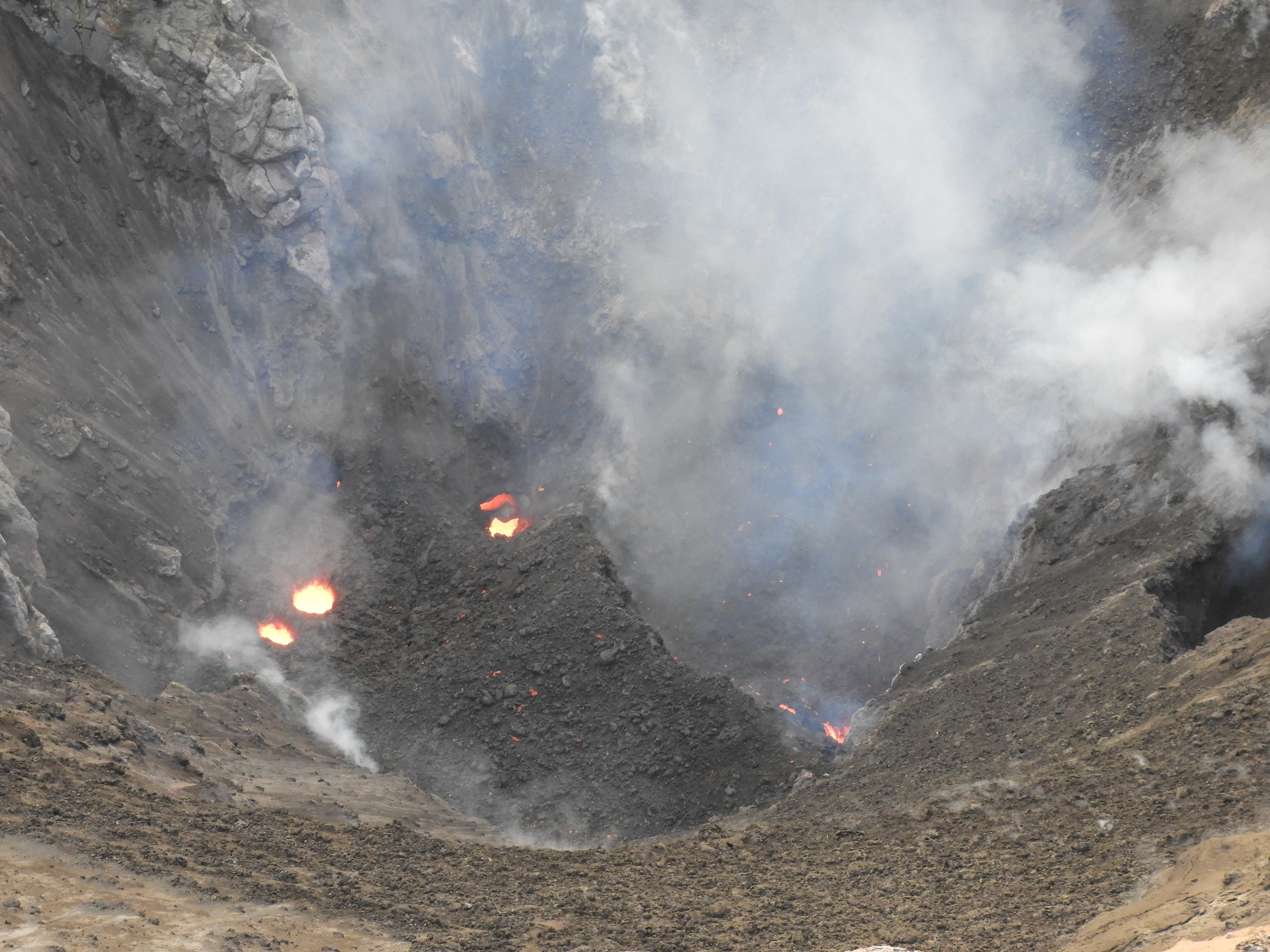
A landslide deposit obstructing a lava lake in the north crater of Mount Yasur on Tanna Island, Vanuatu

A volcanic landslide or volcanogenic landslide is a type of mass wasting that takes place at volcanoes. Typically, the volcano builds up material in a peak that eventually becomes too high to be stable; the instability is relieved when a portion of the peak slides to a lower position.

== Occurrences ==
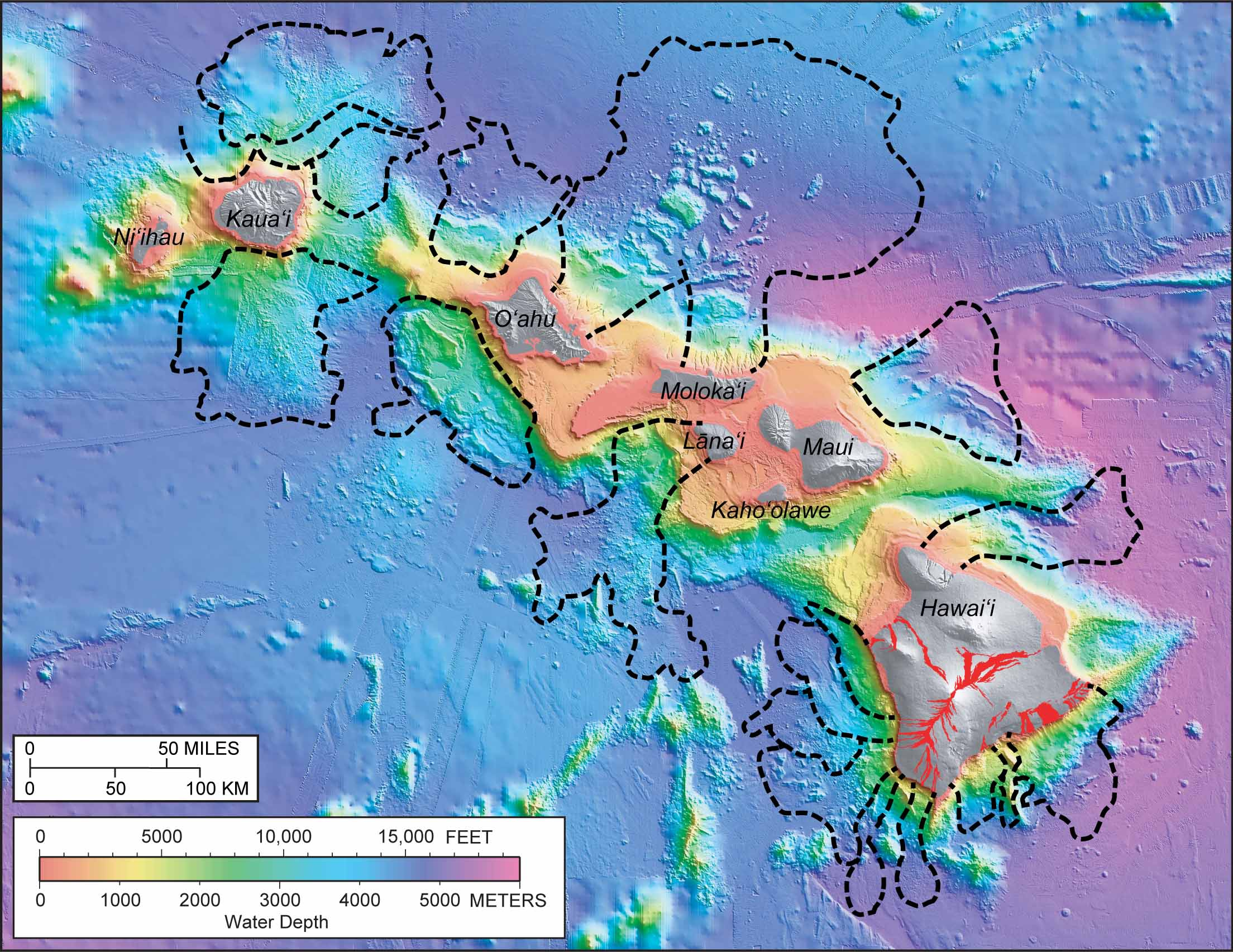
Black dashed lines delineate 17 distinct landslides that have occurred around the Hawaiian Islands over the last several million years

All volcanic edifices are susceptible to landslides, particularly stratovolcanoes and shield volcanoes where landslides are important processes. Volcanic landslides range in size from less than 1 km^{3} (0.24 mi^{3}) to more than 100 km^{3} (24 mi^{3}). The largest volcanic landslides on Earth occur from submarine volcanoes and are several times larger than those that occur on land. Submarine landslides with volumes of 100–150 km^{3} (24–36 mi^{3}) have occurred in the Canary Islands within the last 43 million years, but the largest submarine landslides could have been up to 900 km^{3} (220 mi^{3}) in volume. Massive submarine landslides have also taken place in the Hawaiian Islands over the last several million years, the largest of which constitute significant portions of the islands from which they originated.

Smaller landslides have also been identified at volcanoes on Mars and Venus. Martian landslides reach lengths of 90 km (56 mi) and more whereas the largest Venusian landslides extend only about 50 km (31 mi). The most dramatic landslide deposits on Venus occur beneath the slopes of volcanoes. Since erosion rates on Venus are much lower than those on Earth due to the lack of water on the surface, landslides are an important mechanism in wearing down mountain regions on Venus. The rounded hills of the complexly deformed tessera, or tile-like, terrain on Venus have probably been modified by numerous landslides.

== Types ==
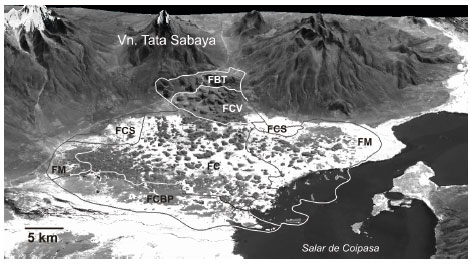
Debris avalanche deposit of Tata Sabaya in Bolivia

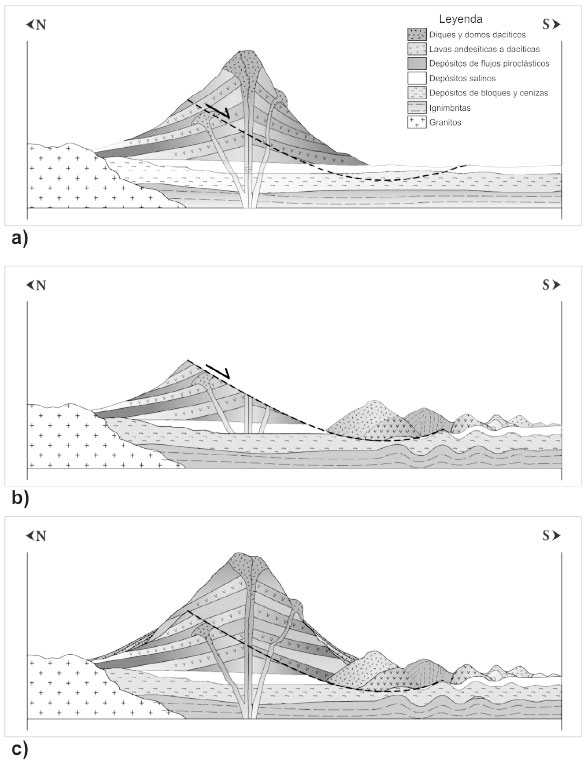
Cross-section diagram showing (a) pre-collapse volcano, (b) after collapse, (c) new edifice built on top of collapsed old edifice

At volcanoes, the term landslide is commonly used for slope movements with shear and displacement in a relatively narrow zone. They can be in the form of debris avalanches, debris flows, slumps and rockfalls. A debris avalanche is a sudden, very rapid flow of rock and soil in response to gravity. It is a common middle stage in the transformation of a cohesive debris flow from a landslide or rockslide. Debris avalanches may be restricted to grain flows or granular flows, in which flow mechanics are governed by particle interactions involving friction and collision. Debris flows, in contrast, owe much of their behaviour to excess pore-water pressure and a pore fluid that is viscous and contains fine sediment.

=== Sector collapses ===
The largest landslides from volcanoes are called sector or edifice collapses. Prehistoric sector collapses are preserved in the geological record in the form of debris avalanche deposits and collapse scars. Debris avalanche deposits can be found up to 20 km (12 mi) from the site of collapse. Collapse scars are also an indicator of sector collapse and are often described as "amphitheatre" or "horseshoe" shaped. Such collapse scars, open at one end, have long been noted in many volcanic regions around the world. The largest volcanic island sector collapse in historic times took place in 1888 when Ritter Island collapsed off the northern coast of Papua New Guinea. Edifice reconstruction generally must occur before a second sector collapse.

Prehistoric

- Stromboli, Sciara del Fuoco collapse
- Popocatépetl, Ventorrillo collapse
- Mount Rainier, Osceola collapse

Historic

- Mount St. Helens, 1980
- Anak Krakatoa, 2018
- Mount Bandai, 1888

=== Flank collapses ===
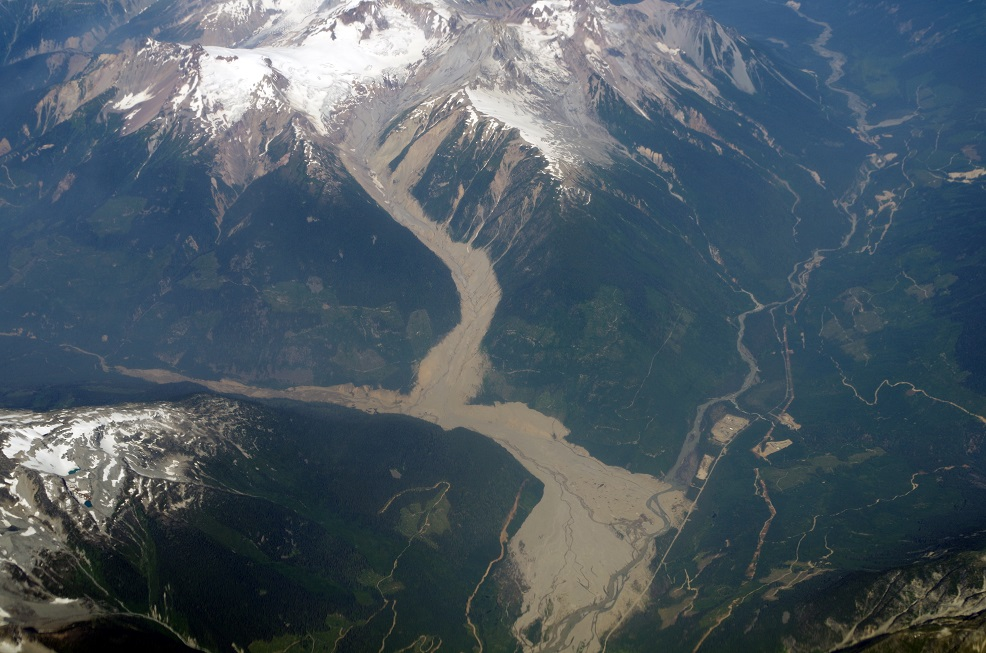
The 2010 Mount Meager landslide deposit in British Columbia, Canada

Flank collapses are much smaller than sector collapses, but they may also yield far-reaching debris flows. Flank collapses differ from sector collapses in that they only involve the volcano flank whereas sector collapses are large enough to involve the volcano summit. The smaller size of a flank collapse indicates that there need be no repose time before another flank collapse occurs, and hence they can be treated as random events.

Prehistoric

- East Molokai Volcano, Wailau collapse
- Koʻolau Volcano, Nuʻuanu collapse
- Mount Garibaldi, Cheekye collapse

Historic

- Mount Meager, 2010
- Mount Elgon, 2010
- Kīlauea, Hilina Slump

== Causes ==
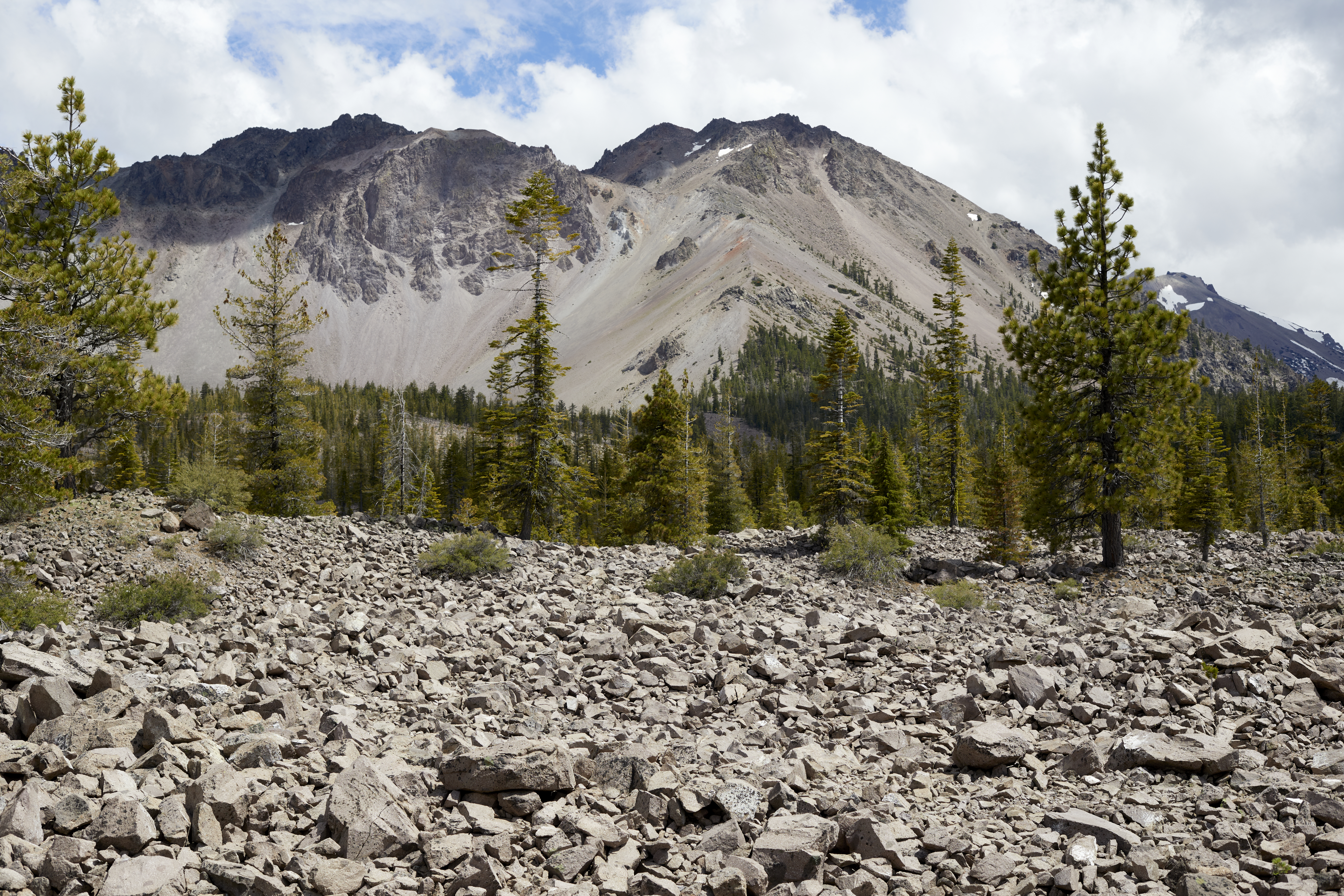
The Chaos Crags with the Chaos Jumbles in the foreground

Several conditions can trigger landslides at volcanoes:

- Intrusion of magma into a volcano
- Explosive eruptions
- Large earthquake directly beneath a volcano or nearby
- Saturation of the ground
- Hydrothermal alteration of volcanic rocks
- Structural discontinuities
- High lava accumulation rates
- Steep slopes

== Hazards ==
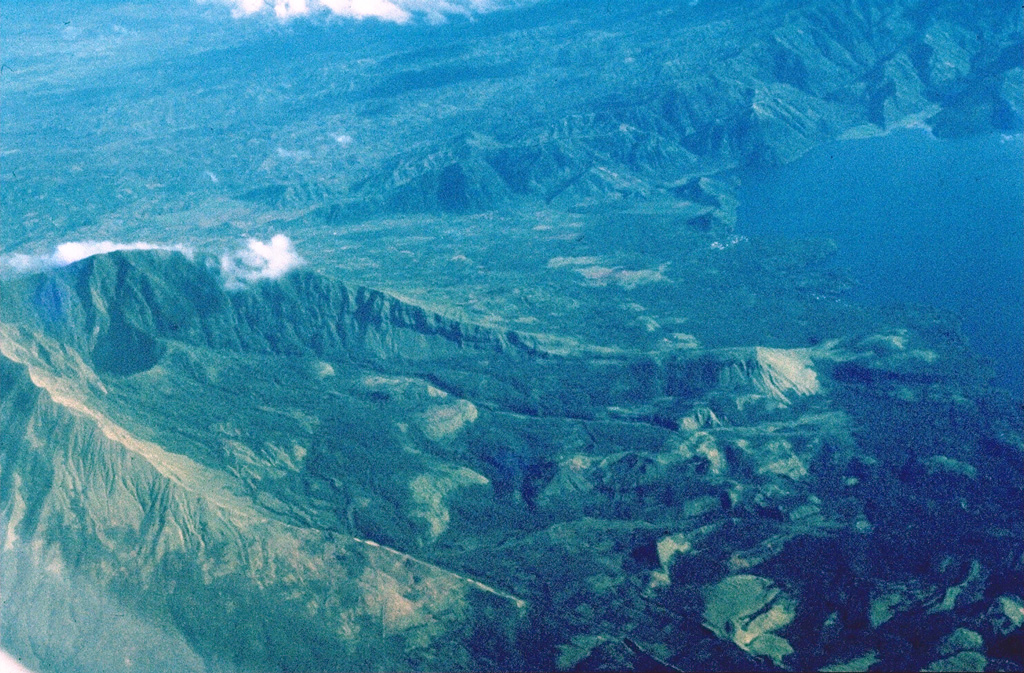
The southeastern side of Mount Iriga in the Philippines contains a large horseshoe-shaped crater formed by a sector collapse

Large landslides from volcanoes often bury valleys with tens to hundreds of metres of rock debris, forming a chaotic landscape marked by dozens of small hills and closed depressions. If the landslide deposit is thick enough, it may dam streams to form lakes. These lakes may eventually drain catastrophically to create floods and lahars downstream.

Landslides that remove a large portion of a volcanic cone may abruptly decrease pressure on shallow magmatic and hydrothermal systems, which can generate explosions ranging from a small steam explosion to large steam and magma-driven directed blasts. These result in tephra and ash fall hazards for surrounding areas.

Large horseshoe-shaped craters formed by landslides at volcanoes will likely direct subsequent lava flows, pyroclastic flows or lahars toward its breached opening if the primary eruptive vent is located within these deep craters.

The collapse of island or coastal volcanoes from giant landslides can generate tsunamis that could potentially devastate large areas of coastal land.

== Disasters ==
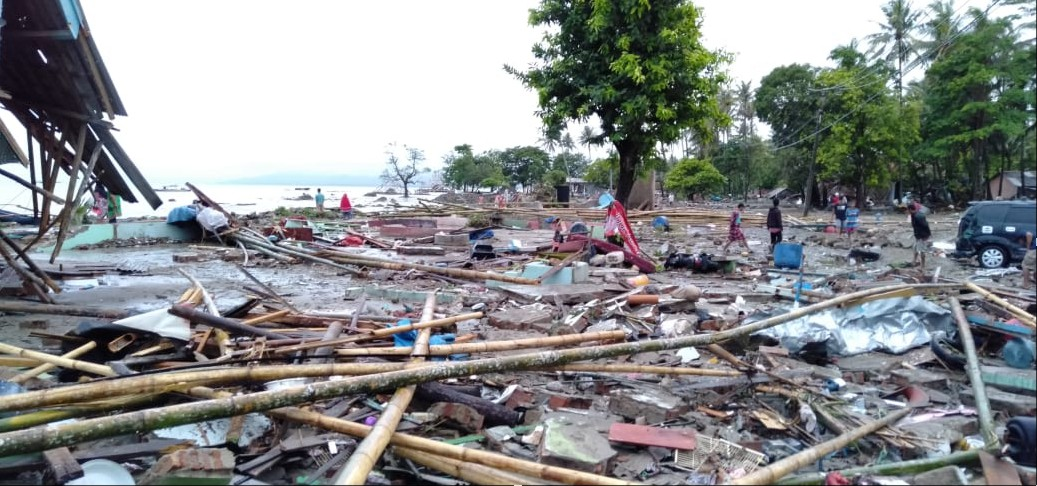
Destruction in Banten caused by the 2018 Sunda Strait tsunami

Historically, the most deadly volcanic landslide occurred in 1792 when sliding debris from Mount Mayuyama in Japan slammed into the Ariake Sea and generated a tsunami that reached the opposite shore; nearly 15,000 people were killed.

The sector collapse of Ritter Island in 1888 generated a tsunami with runups of up to 15 m (49 ft) that caused damage more than 700 km (430 mi) away and killed anywhere between 500 and 3,000 people on neighbouring islands.

A landslide originating from Devastation Glacier on the southern flank of the Mount Meager massif in British Columbia, Canada, buried and killed a group of four geologists at the confluence of Devastation Creek and Meager Creek in July 1975.

In 1979, a landslide from the Indonesian volcano Iliwerung produced 9 m-high (30 ft) waves that killed more than 500 people. In December 2018, another landslide-induced tsunami took place in Indonesia's Sunda Strait following a collapse of Anak Krakatoa. The waves struck about 313 km (194 mi) of coastline with various heights, killing at least 373 people and damaging many buildings.

== See also ==
- List of landslides
