= July 18 =

July 18 this year in various calendars
- Saturday, 18 July 2026
| Akan | Nkyimemene |
| Armenian | 3 Aweleach 1475 |
| Aztec | Quecholli 9, 8 Ōlīn |
| Babylonian | 3 Du'uzu, 2337 SE |
| Balinese pawukon | Menga, Kajeng, Jaya, Umanis, Urukung, Saniscara of Pujut, Kala, Gigis, Sri |
| Bengali | 3 Shrabon, BS 1433 |
| Chinese | Yin Water Snake・Willow Mansion; Fire Horse Year, Month 6, Day 5 (Xiaoshu, 5 days until Dashu) |
| Common Era | 18 July 2026 CE |
| Coptic | 11 Epip, AM 1742 |
| Egyptian | 3 Choiak, 2775 NE |
| Ethiopian | 11 Ḥamlē, 2018 Amätä Məhrät |
| French Republican | Décade III, Décadi de Messidor de l'Année 234 de la République |
| Gregorian | 18 July, AD 2026 |
| Hebrew | 4 Av, AM 5786 |
| Hindu | Pūrvaphalgunī・Vyatīpāta; Solar: 2 Śrāvaṇa, 1948 SE; Lunisolar: Caturthī, Śukla pakṣa of Āṣāḍha, 2083 VE; Rāudra・5127 KY・1,872,774 |
| Icelandic | Laugardagur, 27 Sólmánuður 2026 |
| Islamic | 2 Safar, AH 1448 (using tabular method) |
| ISO week date | 2026-W29-6 |
| Japanese | 5 Minazuki, Reiwa 8 (Shōsho, 5 days until Taisho) |
| Julian | 5 July, AD 2026 (AM 7534) |
| Julian day | 2461240 |
| Korean | 5 Yangdal, 4359 DE |
| Maya | 13.0.13.13.17; 10 Xul, 8 Caban |
| Roman | ante diem III Nonas Iulias, MMDCCLXXIX AUC |
| Solar Hijri | 27 Tir, SH 1405 |
| Tibetan | 4 chu stod, me pho rta 2153 or 1772 or 1000 |

| << | July | | | | | >> |
| Su | Mo | Tu | We | Th | Fr | Sa |
| | | | 1 | 2 | 3 | 4 |
| 5 | 6 | 7 | 8 | 9 | 10 | 11 |
| 12 | 13 | 14 | 15 | 16 | 17 | 18 |
| 19 | 20 | 21 | 22 | 23 | 24 | 25 |
| 26 | 27 | 28 | 29 | 30 | 31 |
2026

July 18 in recent years
2026 (Saturday)
2025 (Friday)
2024 (Thursday)
2023 (Tuesday)
2022 (Monday)
2021 (Sunday)
2020 (Saturday)
2019 (Thursday)
2018 (Wednesday)
2017 (Tuesday)

July 18 is the 199th day of the year (200th in leap years) in the Gregorian calendar; 166 days remain until the end of the year.

== Events ==
=== Pre-1600 ===
- 477 BC – Battle of the Cremera as part of the Roman–Etruscan Wars. Veii ambushes and defeats the Roman army.
- 387 BC – Roman-Gaulish Wars: Battle of the Allia: A Roman army is defeated by raiding Gauls, leading to the subsequent sacking of Rome.
- 362 – Roman–Persian Wars: Emperor Julian arrives at Antioch with a Roman expeditionary force (60,000 men) and stays there for nine months to launch a campaign against the Persian Empire.
- 452 – Sack of Aquileia: After an earlier defeat on the Catalaunian Plains, Attila lays siege to the metropolis of Aquileia and eventually destroys it.
- 645 – Chinese forces under general Li Shiji besiege the strategic fortress city of Anshi (Liaoning) during the Goguryeo–Tang War.
- 1195 – Battle of Alarcos: Almohad forces defeat the Castilian army of Alfonso VIII and force its retreat to Toledo.
- 1216 – Election of pope Honorius III following the death of pope Innocent III two days prior.
- 1290 – King Edward I of England issues the Edict of Expulsion, banishing all Jews (numbering about 16,000) from England.
- 1334 – The bishop of Florence blesses the first foundation stone for the new campanile (bell tower) of the Florence Cathedral, designed by the artist Giotto di Bondone.
- 1389 – France and England agree to the Truce of Leulinghem, inaugurating a 13-year peace, the longest period of sustained peace during the Hundred Years' War.
- 1507 – In Brussels, Prince Charles I is crowned Duke of Burgundy and Count of Flanders, a year after inheriting the title.
- 1555 – The College of Arms is reincorporated by Royal charter signed by Queen Mary I of England and King Philip II of Spain.

=== 1601–1900 ===
- 1723 – Johann Sebastian Bach leads the first performance of his cantata Erforsche mich, Gott, und erfahre mein Herz, BWV 136, in Leipzig on the eighth Sunday after Trinity.
- 1806 – A gunpowder magazine explosion in Birgu, Malta, kills around 200 people.
- 1812 – The Treaties of Orebro end both the Anglo-Russian and Anglo-Swedish Wars.
- 1841 – Coronation of Emperor Pedro II of Brazil.
- 1857 – Louis Faidherbe, French governor of Senegal, arrives to relieve French forces at Kayes, effectively ending El Hajj Umar Tall's war against the French.
- 1862 – First ascent of Dent Blanche, one of the highest summits in the Alps.
- 1863 – American Civil War: Second Battle of Fort Wagner: One of the first formal African American military units, the 54th Massachusetts Volunteer Infantry, supported by several white regiments, attempts an unsuccessful assault on Confederate-held Battery Wagner.
- 1870 – The First Vatican Council decrees the dogma of papal infallibility.
- 1872 – The Ballot Act 1872 in the United Kingdom introduced the requirement that parliamentary and local government elections be held by secret ballot.

=== 1901–present ===
- 1914 – The U.S. Congress forms the Aviation Section, U.S. Signal Corps, giving official status to aircraft within the U.S. Army for the first time.
- 1925 – Adolf Hitler publishes Mein Kampf.
- 1942 – World War II: During the Beisfjord massacre in Norway, 15 Norwegian paramilitary guards help members of the SS to kill 288 political prisoners from Yugoslavia.
- 1942 – The Germans test fly the Messerschmitt Me 262 using its jet engines for the first time.
- 1944 – World War II: Hideki Tōjō resigns as Prime Minister of Japan because of numerous setbacks in the war effort.
- 1966 – Human spaceflight: Gemini 10 is launched from Cape Kennedy on a 70-hour mission that includes docking with an orbiting Agena target vehicle.
- 1966 – A racially charged incident in a bar sparks the six-day Hough riots in Cleveland, Ohio; 1,700 Ohio National Guard troops intervene to restore order.
- 1968 – Intel is founded in Mountain View, California.
- 1970 – An Antonov An-22 of the Soviet Air Forces crashes into the Atlantic Ocean, killing all 23 aboard.
- 1976 – Nadia Comăneci becomes the first person in Olympic Games history to score a perfect 10 in gymnastics at the 1976 Summer Olympics.
- 1979 – A landslide occurs on the Iliwerung volcano in Indonesia, triggering a tsunami that kills over 530 and leaves 700 missing.
- 1981 – A Canadair CL-44 and Sukhoi Su-15 collide in mid-air near Yerevan, Armenia, killing four.
- 1982 – Two hundred sixty-eight Guatemalan campesinos ("peasants" or "country people") are slain in the Plan de Sánchez massacre.
- 1984 – McDonald's massacre in San Ysidro, California: James Oliver Huberty kills 21 people and injures 19 others before being shot dead by police.
- 1992 – A picture of Les Horribles Cernettes was taken, which became the first ever photo posted to the World Wide Web.
- 1994 – The bombing of the Asociación Mutual Israelita Argentina (Argentine Jewish Community Center) in Buenos Aires kills 85 (mostly Jewish) people and injures 300.
- 1994 – Rwandan genocide: The Rwandan Patriotic Front takes control of Gisenyi and north western Rwanda, forcing the interim government into Zaire and ending the genocide.
- 1995 – On the Caribbean island of Montserrat, the Soufrière Hills volcano erupts. Over the course of several years, it devastates the island, destroying the capital, forcing most of the population to flee.
- 1996 – Storms provoke severe flooding on the Saguenay River, beginning one of Quebec's costliest natural disasters ever.
- 1996 – Battle of Mullaitivu: The Liberation Tigers of Tamil Eelam capture the Sri Lanka Army's base, killing over 1,200 soldiers.
- 2002 – A Consolidated PB4Y-2 Privateer crashes near Estes Park, Colorado, killing both crew members.
- 2012 – At least seven people are killed and 32 others are injured after a bomb explodes on an Israeli tour bus at Burgas Airport, Bulgaria.
- 2013 – The Government of Detroit, with up to $20 billion in debt, files for the largest municipal bankruptcy in U.S. history.
- 2014 – The Islamic State of Iraq and the Levant requires Christians to either accept dhimmi status, emigrate from ISIL lands, or be killed.
- 2019 – A man sets fire to an anime studio in Fushimi-ku, Kyoto, Japan, killing 36 people and injuring dozens of others.

== Births ==
=== Pre-1600 ===
- 1013 – Hermann of Reichenau, German composer, mathematician, and astronomer (died 1054)
- 1501 – Isabella of Austria, queen of Denmark (died 1526)
- 1504 – Heinrich Bullinger, Swiss pastor and reformer (died 1575)
- 1534 – Zacharius Ursinus, German theologian (died 1583)
- 1552 – Rudolf II, Holy Roman Emperor (died 1612)

=== 1601–1900 ===
- 1634 – Johannes Camphuys, Dutch politician, Governor-general of the Dutch East Indies (died 1695)
- 1659 – Hyacinthe Rigaud, French painter (died 1743)
- 1670 – Giovanni Bononcini, Italian cellist and composer (died 1747)
- 1702 – Maria Clementina Sobieska, Polish noble (died 1735)
- 1718 – Saverio Bettinelli, Italian poet, playwright, and critic (died 1808)
- 1720 – Gilbert White, English ornithologist and ecologist (died 1793)
- 1724 – Maria Antonia of Bavaria, Electress of Saxony (died 1780)
- 1750 – Frederick Adolf, duke of Östergötland (died 1803)
- 1796 – Immanuel Hermann Fichte, German philosopher and academic (died 1879)
- 1811 – William Makepeace Thackeray, English author and poet (died 1863)
- 1818 – Louis Gerhard De Geer, Swedish lawyer and politician, 1st Prime Minister of Sweden (died 1896)
- 1821 – Pauline Viardot, French soprano and composer (died 1910)
- 1837 – Vasil Levski, Bulgarian priest and activist (died 1873)
- 1842 – William D. Coleman, 13th President of Liberia (died 1908)
- 1843 – Virgil Earp, American marshal (died 1905)
- 1845 – Tristan Corbière, French poet (died 1875)
- 1848 – W. G. Grace, English cricketer and physician (died 1915)
- 1853 – Hendrik Lorentz, Dutch physicist and academic, Nobel Prize laureate (died 1928)
- 1861 – Kadambini Ganguly, Indian physician, one of the first Indian women to obtain a degree (died 1923)
- 1864 – Philip Snowden, 1st Viscount Snowden, English politician, Chancellor of the Exchequer (died 1937)
- 1867 – Margaret Brown, American philanthropist and activist (died 1932)
- 1871 – Giacomo Balla, Italian painter (died 1958)
- 1871 – Sada Yacco, Japanese actress and dancer (died 1946)
- 1872 – Julius Fučík, Czech composer and conductor of military bands (died 1916)
- 1881 – Larry McLean, Canadian-American baseball player (died 1921)
- 1884 – Alberto di Jorio, Italian cardinal (died 1979)
- 1886 – Simon Bolivar Buckner Jr., American general (died 1945)
- 1887 – Vidkun Quisling, Norwegian military officer and politician, Minister President of Norway (died 1945)
- 1889 – Kōichi Kido, Japanese politician, 13th Lord Keeper of the Privy Seal of Japan (died 1977)
- 1890 – Frank Forde, Australian educator and politician, 15th Prime Minister of Australia (died 1983)
- 1892 – Arthur Friedenreich, Brazilian footballer (died 1969)
- 1893 – David Ogilvy, 12th Earl of Airlie, Scottish peer, soldier and courtier (died 1968)
- 1895 – Olga Spessivtseva, Russian-American ballerina (died 1991)
- 1895 – Machine Gun Kelly, American gangster (died 1954)
- 1897 – Ernest Eldridge, English race car driver and engineer (died 1935)
- 1898 – John Stuart, Scottish-English actor (died 1979)
- 1899 – Ernst Scheller, German soldier and politician, 8th Mayor of Marburg (died 1942)
- 1900 – Nathalie Sarraute, French lawyer and author (died 1999)

=== 1901–present ===
- 1902 – Jessamyn West, American author (died 1984)
- 1902 – Chill Wills, American actor (died 1978)
- 1906 – S. I. Hayakawa, Canadian-American academic and politician (died 1992)
- 1906 – Clifford Odets, American director, playwright, and screenwriter (died 1963)
- 1908 – Peace Pilgrim, American mystic and activist (died 1981)
- 1908 – Lupe Vélez, Mexican-American actress and dancer (died 1944)
- 1908 – Beatrice Aitchison, American mathematician, statistician, and transportation economist (died 1997)
- 1909 – Bishnu Dey, Indian poet, critic, and academic (died 1982)
- 1909 – Andrei Gromyko, Belarusian-Russian economist and politician, Soviet Minister of Foreign Affairs (died 1989)
- 1909 – Mohammed Daoud Khan, Afghan commander and politician, 1st President of Afghanistan (died 1978)
- 1909 – Harriet Nelson, American singer and actress (died 1994)
- 1910 – Diptendu Pramanick, Indian businessman (died 1989)
- 1910 – Mamadou Dia, Senegalese politician; 1st Prime Minister of Senegal (died 2009)
- 1911 – Hume Cronyn, Canadian-American actor, producer, and screenwriter (died 2003)
- 1913 – Red Skelton, American actor and comedian (died 1997)
- 1914 – Gino Bartali, Italian cyclist (died 2000)
- 1914 – Oscar Heisserer, French footballer (died 2004)
- 1915 – Carequinha, Brazilian clown and actor (died 2006)
- 1915 – Louis Le Bailly, British Royal Navy officer (died 2010)
- 1916 – L. Patrick Gray, American lawyer and bureaucrat (died 2005)
- 1916 – Charles Kittel, American physicist (died 2019)
- 1917 – Henri Salvador, French singer and guitarist (died 2008)
- 1917 – Paul Streeten, Austrian-born British economics professor (died 2019)
- 1918 – Nelson Mandela, South African lawyer and politician, 1st President of South Africa, Nobel Prize laureate (died 2013)
- 1919 – Lilia Dale, Italian actress (died 1991)
- 1920 – Eric Brandon, English race car driver and businessman (died 1982)
- 1921 – Peter Austin, English brewer, founded Ringwood Brewery (died 2014)
- 1921 – Aaron Beck, American psychiatrist and academic (died 2021)
- 1921 – John Glenn, American colonel, astronaut, and politician (died 2016)
- 1921 – Richard Leacock, English-French director and producer (died 2011)
- 1921 – Heinz Bennent, German actor (died 2011)
- 1922 – Thomas Kuhn, American physicist, historian, and philosopher (died 1996)
- 1923 – Jerome H. Lemelson, American engineer and businessman (died 1997)
- 1923 – Michael Medwin, English actor (died 2020)
- 1924 – Inge Sørensen, Danish swimmer (died 2011)
- 1924 – Tullio Altamura, Italian actor
- 1925 – Shirley Strickland, Australian runner and hurdler (died 2004)
- 1925 – Friedrich Zimmermann, German lawyer and politician, German Federal Minister of the Interior (died 2012)
- 1925 – Raymond Jones, Australian Modernist architect (died 2022)
- 1925 – Windy McCall, American baseball relief pitcher (died 2015)
- 1926 – Margaret Laurence, Canadian author and academic (died 1987)
- 1926 – Nita Bieber, American actress (died 2019)
- 1926 – Bernard Pons, French politician and medical doctor (died 2022)
- 1926 – Maunu Kurkvaara, Finnish film director and screenwriter (died 2023)
- 1926 – Elizabeth Jennings, English poet (died 2001)
- 1927 – Mehdi Hassan, Pakistani ghazal singer and playback singer (died 2012)
- 1927 – Kurt Masur, German conductor and educator (died 2015)
- 1927 – Antonio García-Trevijano, Spanish republican, political activist, and author (died 2018)
- 1927 – Keith MacDonald, Canadian politician (died 2021)
- 1927 – Anthony Mirra, American gangster, member of the Bonanno Crime Family (died 1982)
- 1928 – Andrea Gallo, Italian priest and author (died 2013)
- 1928 – Baddiewinkle, American internet personality (died 2025)
- 1929 – Dick Button, American figure skater and actor (died 2025)
- 1929 – Screamin' Jay Hawkins, American R&B singer-songwriter, musician, and actor (died 2000)
- 1932 – Robert Ellis Miller, American director and screenwriter (died 2017)
- 1933 – Jean Yanne, French actor, director, producer, and screenwriter (died 2003)
- 1933 – Yevgeny Yevtushenko, Russian poet and playwright (died 2017)
- 1934 – Edward Bond, English director, playwright, and screenwriter (died 2024)
- 1934 – Darlene Conley, American actress (died 2007)
- 1935 – Tenley Albright, American former figure skater and physician
- 1935 – Jayendra Saraswathi, Indian guru, 69th Shankaracharya (died 2018)
- 1937 – Roald Hoffmann, Polish chemist and academic, Nobel Prize laureate
- 1937 – Hunter S. Thompson, American journalist and author (died 2005)
- 1938 – John Connelly, English footballer (died 2012)
- 1938 – Ian Stewart, Scottish keyboard player and manager (died 1985)
- 1938 – Paul Verhoeven, Dutch director, producer, and screenwriter
- 1939 – Brian Auger, English rock and jazz keyboard player
- 1939 – Dion DiMucci, American singer-songwriter and guitarist
- 1939 – Jerry Moore, American football player and coach
- 1940 – James Brolin, American actor
- 1940 – Joe Torre, American baseball player, manager, and executive
- 1941 – Frank Farian, German songwriter and producer (died 2024)
- 1941 – Lonnie Mack, American singer-songwriter and guitarist (died 2016)
- 1941 – Martha Reeves, American singer and politician
- 1942 – Giacinto Facchetti, Italian footballer (died 2006)
- 1942 – Adolf Ogi, Swiss politician, 84th President of the Swiss Confederation
- 1943 – Joseph J. Ellis, American historian and author
- 1943 – Don Awrey, Canadian ice hockey player
- 1943 – Calvin Peete, American golfer (12 PGA Tour titles) (died 2015)
- 1944 – David Hemery, English hurdler and author
- 1945 – Pat Doherty, Irish Republican politician
- 1946 – Kalpana Mohan, Indian actress (died 2012)
- 1947 – Steve Forbes, American publisher and politician
- 1948 – Carlos Colón Sr., Puerto Rican-American wrestler and promoter
- 1948 – Jeanne Córdova, American journalist and activist (died 2016)
- 1948 – Hartmut Michel, German biochemist and academic, Nobel Prize laureate
- 1949 – Dennis Lillee, Australian cricketer and coach
- 1950 – Richard Branson, English businessman, founded Virgin Group
- 1950 – Jack Dongarra, American computer scientist and academic
- 1950 – Kostas Eleftherakis, Greek footballer
- 1950 – Glenn Hughes, American disco singer and actor (died 2001)
- 1950 – Shahid Khan, Pakistani-American businessman and sports executive
- 1950 – Jack Layton, Canadian political scientist, academic, and politician (died 2011)
- 1950 – Mark Udall, American educator and politician
- 1951 – Elio Di Rupo, Belgian chemist, academic, and politician, 68th Prime Minister of Belgium
- 1951 – Margo Martindale, American actress
- 1954 – Ricky Skaggs, American singer-songwriter, mandolin player, and producer
- 1955 – Bernd Fasching, Austrian painter and sculptor
- 1957 – Nick Faldo, English golfer and sportscaster
- 1957 – Keith Levene, English guitarist, songwriter, and producer (died 2022)
- 1960 – Simon Heffer, English journalist and author
- 1961 – Elizabeth McGovern, American actress
- 1961 – Alan Pardew, English footballer and manager
- 1961 – Pasi Rautiainen, Finnish footballer, coach, and manager
- 1962 – Shaun Micallef, Australian comedian, producer, and screenwriter
- 1963 – Marc Girardelli, Austrian-Luxembourgish skier
- 1963 – Martín Torrijos, Panamanian economist and politician, 35th President of Panama
- 1963 – Mike Greenwell, American baseball player (died 2025)
- 1964 – Wendy Williams, American talk show host
- 1965 – Vesselina Kasarova, Bulgarian soprano
- 1966 – Dan O'Brien, American decathlete and coach
- 1967 – Vin Diesel, American actor, director, producer, and screenwriter
- 1968 – Grant Bowler, New Zealand-Australian actor
- 1968 – Scott Gourley, Australian rugby player
- 1969 – Elizabeth Gilbert, American author
- 1969 – The Great Sasuke, Japanese wrestler and politician
- 1971 – Penny Hardaway, American basketball player and coach
- 1971 – Sukhwinder Singh, Indian singer-songwriter and actor
- 1971 – Joe Russo, American director, producer and screenwriter
- 1974 – Alan Morrison, British poet
- 1975 – Torii Hunter, American baseball player
- 1975 – Daron Malakian, American singer-songwriter, guitarist, and producer
- 1975 – M.I.A., English rapper and producer
- 1976 – Elsa Pataky, Spanish actress
- 1976 – Go Soo-hee, South Korean actress
- 1977 – Alexander Morozevich, Russian chess player and author
- 1977 – Kelly Reilly, English actress
- 1978 – Adabel Guerrero, Argentinian actress, singer, and dancer
- 1978 – Shane Horgan, Irish rugby player and sportscaster
- 1978 – Crystal Mangum, American murderer responsible for making false rape allegations in the Duke lacrosse case
- 1978 – Joo Sang-wook, South Korean actor
- 1978 – Ben Sheets, American baseball player and coach
- 1978 – Mélissa Theuriau, French journalist
- 1979 – Deion Branch, American football player
- 1979 – Joey Mercury, American wrestler and producer
- 1980 – Kristen Bell, American actress
- 1980 – David Blu, American–Israeli basketball player
- 1980 – Ryōko Hirosue, Japanese actress
- 1981 – Dennis Seidenberg, German ice hockey player
- 1981 – Michiel Huisman, Dutch actor
- 1982 – Ryan Cabrera, American singer-songwriter and guitarist
- 1982 – Priyanka Chopra, Indian actress, singer, and film producer
- 1982 – Carlo Costly, Honduran footballer
- 1983 – Mishaal Al-Saeed, Saudi Arabian footballer
- 1983 – Carlos Diogo, Uruguayan footballer
- 1983 – Aaron Gillespie, American singer-songwriter and drummer
- 1983 – Mikk Pahapill, Estonian decathlete
- 1983 – Jan Schlaudraff, German footballer
- 1984 – Ben Askren, American mixed martial artist and boxer
- 1985 – Chace Crawford, American actor
- 1985 – Panagiotis Lagos, Greek footballer
- 1985 – James Norton, English actor
- 1986 – Natalia Mikhailova, Russian ice dancer
- 1987 – Tontowi Ahmad, Indonesian badminton player
- 1988 – Änis Ben-Hatira, German-Tunisian footballer
- 1988 – César Villaluz, Mexican footballer
- 1989 – Jamie Benn, Canadian ice hockey player
- 1989 – Sebastian Mielitz, German footballer
- 1989 – Yohan Mollo, French footballer
- 1990 – Canelo Álvarez, Mexican boxer
- 1991 – Mandy Rose, American wrestler and television personality
- 1991 – Eugenio Suárez, Venezuelan baseball player
- 1992 – Thanasis Antetokounmpo, Greek basketball player
- 1993 – Lee Tae-min, South Korean singer and actor
- 1993 – Michael Lichaa, Australian rugby league player
- 1994 – Nilo Soares, East Timorese footballer
- 1996 – Yung Lean, Swedish rapper and singer-songwriter
- 1996 – Smriti Mandhana, Indian cricketer
- 1996 – Shudufhadzo Musida, Miss South Africa 2020
- 1996 – Manuel Otto, German video game developer (died 2026)
- 1997 – Bam Adebayo, American basketball player
- 1997 – Noah Lyles, American sprinter
- 1997 – Fionn Whitehead, English actor
- 1999 – Miro Heiskanen, Finnish ice hockey player
- 2000 – Sarah Kinsley, American singer-songwriter
- 2001 – Agustina Roth, Argentine BMX rider
- 2006 – Caleb Wilson, American basketball player
- 2007 – Cameron Boozer, American basketball player

== Deaths ==
=== Pre-1600 ===
- 707 – Emperor Monmu of Japan (born 683)
- 715 – Muhammad bin Qasim, Umayyad general (born 695)
- 912 – Zhu Wen, Chinese emperor (born 852)
- 924 – Abu'l-Hasan Ali ibn al-Furat, Abbasid vizier (born 855)
- 928 – Stephen II, patriarch of Constantinople
- 984 – Dietrich I, bishop of Metz
- 1100 – Godfrey of Bouillon, Frankish knight (born 1016)
- 1185 – Stefan, first Archbishop of Uppsala (born before 1143)
- 1194 – Guy of Lusignan, king consort of Jerusalem (born c. 1150)
- 1232 – John de Braose, Marcher Lord of Bramber and Gower
- 1270 – Boniface of Savoy, Archbishop of Canterbury
- 1300 – Gerard Segarelli, Italian religious leader, founded the Apostolic Brethren (born 1240)
- 1450 – Francis I, Duke of Brittany (born 1414)
- 1488 – Alvise Cadamosto, Italian explorer (born 1432)
- 1566 – Bartolomé de las Casas, Spanish bishop and historian (born c.1484)
- 1591 – Jacobus Gallus, Slovenian composer (born 1550)

=== 1601–1900 ===
- 1608 – Joachim Frederick, Elector of Brandenburg (born 1546)
- 1610 – Caravaggio, Italian painter (born 1571)
- 1639 – Bernard of Saxe-Weimar, German general (born 1604)
- 1650 – Robert Levinz, English Royalist, hanged in London by Parliamentary forces as a spy (born 1615)
- 1695 – Johannes Camphuys, Dutch politician, Governor-general of the Dutch East Indies (born 1634)
- 1698 – Johann Heinrich Heidegger, Swiss theologian and author (born 1633)
- 1721 – Jean-Antoine Watteau, French painter (born 1684)
- 1730 – François de Neufville, duc de Villeroy, French general (born 1644)
- 1756 – Pieter Langendijk, Dutch poet and playwright (born 1683)
- 1792 – John Paul Jones, Scottish-American admiral and diplomat (born 1747)
- 1817 – Jane Austen, English novelist (born 1775)
- 1837 – Vincenzo Borg, Maltese merchant and rebel leader (born 1777)
- 1863 – Robert Gould Shaw, American colonel (born 1837)
- 1872 – Benito Juárez, Mexican lawyer and politician, 26th President of Mexico (born 1806)
- 1884 – Ferdinand von Hochstetter, Austrian geologist and academic (born 1829)
- 1890 – Lydia Becker, English journalist, author, and activist, co-founded the Women's Suffrage Journal (born 1827)
- 1892 – Thomas Cook, English travel agent, founded the Thomas Cook Group (born 1808)
- 1899 – Horatio Alger, American novelist and journalist (born 1832)

=== 1901–present ===
- 1916 – Benjamin C. Truman, American journalist and author (born 1835)
- 1925 – Louis-Nazaire Bégin, Canadian cardinal (born 1840)
- 1932 – Jean Jules Jusserand, French author and diplomat, French Ambassador to the United States (born 1855)
- 1937 – Julian Bell, English poet and academic (born 1908)
- 1938 – Marie of Romania (born 1875)
- 1944 – Thomas Sturge Moore, English author, poet, and playwright (born 1870)
- 1947 – Evald Tipner, Estonian footballer and ice hockey player (born 1906)
- 1948 – Herman Gummerus, Finnish historian, academic, and politician (born 1877)
- 1949 – Vítězslav Novák, Czech composer and educator (born 1870)
- 1949 – Francisco Javier Arana, Guatemalan Army colonel and briefly Guatemalan head of state (born 1905)
- 1950 – Carl Clinton Van Doren, American critic and biographer (born 1885)
- 1952 – Paul Saintenoy, Belgian architect and historian (born 1862)
- 1954 – Machine Gun Kelly, American gangster (born 1895)
- 1966 – Bobby Fuller, American singer-songwriter and guitarist (born 1942)
- 1968 – Corneille Heymans, Belgian physiologist and academic, Nobel Prize laureate (born 1892)
- 1969 – Mary Jo Kopechne, American educator and secretary (born 1940)
- 1973 – Jack Hawkins, English actor (born 1910)
- 1975 – Vaughn Bodē, American illustrator (born 1941)
- 1981 – Sonja Branting-Westerståhl, Swedish lawyer (born 1890)
- 1982 – Roman Jakobson, Russian–American linguist and theorist (born 1896)
- 1984 – Lally Bowers, English actress (born 1914)
- 1984 – Grigori Kromanov, Estonian director and screenwriter (born 1926)
- 1987 – Gilberto Freyre, Brazilian sociologist, anthropologist, historian, writer, painter, journalist and congressman (born 1907)
- 1988 – Nico, German singer-songwriter, keyboard player, and actress (born 1938)
- 1988 – Joly Braga Santos, Portuguese composer and conductor (born 1924)
- 1989 – Donnie Moore, American baseball player (born 1954)
- 1989 – Rebecca Schaeffer, American model and actress (born 1967)
- 1990 – Karl Menninger, American psychiatrist and author (born 1896)
- 1990 – Yun Posun, South Korean politician, 2nd President of South Korea (born 1897)
- 2001 – Mimi Fariña, American singer-songwriter and guitarist (born 1945)
- 2002 – Metin Toker, Turkish journalist and author (born 1924)
- 2004 – André Castelot, Belgian-French historian and author (born 1911)
- 2004 – Émile Peynaud, French wine maker (born 1912)
- 2005 – Amy Gillett, Australian cyclist and rower (born 1976)
- 2005 – William Westmoreland, American general (born 1914)
- 2006 – Henry Hewes, American theater writer (born 1917)
- 2007 – Jerry Hadley, American tenor (born 1952)
- 2007 – Kenji Miyamoto, Japanese politician (born 1908)
- 2009 – Henry Allingham, English soldier (born 1896)
- 2009 – Jill Balcon, English actress (born 1925)
- 2012 – Yosef Shalom Eliashiv, Lithuanian-Israeli rabbi and author (born 1910)
- 2012 – Jean François-Poncet, French politician and diplomat, French Minister of Foreign Affairs (born 1928)
- 2012 – Dawoud Rajiha, Syrian general and politician, Syrian Minister of Defense (born 1947)
- 2012 – Assef Shawkat, Syrian general and politician (born 1950)
- 2012 – Hasan Turkmani, Syrian general and politician, Syrian Minister of Defense (born 1935)
- 2012 – Rajesh Khanna, Indian actor (born 1942)
- 2013 – Vaali, Indian poet, songwriter, and actor (born 1931)
- 2013 – Olivier Ameisen, French-American cardiologist and academic (born 1953)
- 2014 – Andreas Biermann, German footballer (born 1980)
- 2014 – João Ubaldo Ribeiro, Brazilian journalist, author, and academic (born 1941)
- 2014 – Dietmar Schönherr, Austrian-Spanish actor, director, and screenwriter (born 1926)
- 2015 – Alex Rocco, American actor (born 1936)
- 2015 – Buddy Buie, American songwriter, producer and publisher (born 1941)
- 2018 – Jonathan Gold, American food critic (born 1960)
- 2018 – Adrian Cronauer, American radio personality (born 1938)
- 2021 – Tom O'Connor, English comedian (born 1939)
- 2023 – Oommen Chandy, Indian politician, former Chief Minister of Kerala (born 1943)
- 2024 – Lou Dobbs, American political commentator and television host (born 1945)
- 2024 – Abner Haynes, American football player (born 1937)
- 2024 – Bob Newhart, American comedian and actor (born 1929)
- 2025 – Edwin Feulner, American political scientist (born 1941)
- 2026 – Chen Gang, Chinese composer (born 1935)
- 2026 – Zdeněk Chovanec, Czech-Venezuelan-Portuguese racing driver (born 2004)

== Holidays and observances ==
- Christian feast day:
  - Arnulf of Metz
  - Bruno of Segni
  - Camillus de Lellis (optional memorial, United States only)
  - Eadburh (or Edburga) of Bicester
  - Elizabeth Ferard (Church of England)
  - Frederick of Utrecht
  - Maternus of Milan
  - Pambo
  - Philastrius
  - Symphorosa
  - Theodosia of Constantinople
  - July 18 (Eastern Orthodox liturgics)
- Constitution Day (Uruguay)
- Nelson Mandela International Day
