= Volcanogenic =

Volcanogenic means "created by a volcano". It may refer to:

- Volcanogenic lake
- Volcanogenic massive sulfide ore deposit
- Volcanogenic tsunami
