= Volcanic tsunami =

Natural hazard

Animation of the 2022 Hunga Tonga–Hunga Ha'apai tsunami

A volcanic tsunami, also called a volcanogenic tsunami, is a tsunami produced by volcanic phenomena. About 20–25% of all fatalities at volcanoes during the last 250 years have been caused by volcanic tsunamis. The most devastating volcanic tsunami in recorded history was that produced by the 1883 eruption of Krakatoa. The waves reached heights of 40 m (130 ft) and killed 36,000 people.

== Causes ==
A wide variety of volcanic processes can produce tsunamis. This includes volcanic earthquakes, caldera collapse, explosive submarine eruptions, the effects of pyroclastic flows and lahars on water, base surges with accompanying shock waves, lava avalanching into the sea, air waves from explosive subaerial eruptions, avalanches of cold rock, and avalanches of hot material. Volcanic tsunamis produced by large lateral collapse landslides and ocean-entering pyroclastic flows are the largest and most hazardous.

=== Volcanic eruptions ===
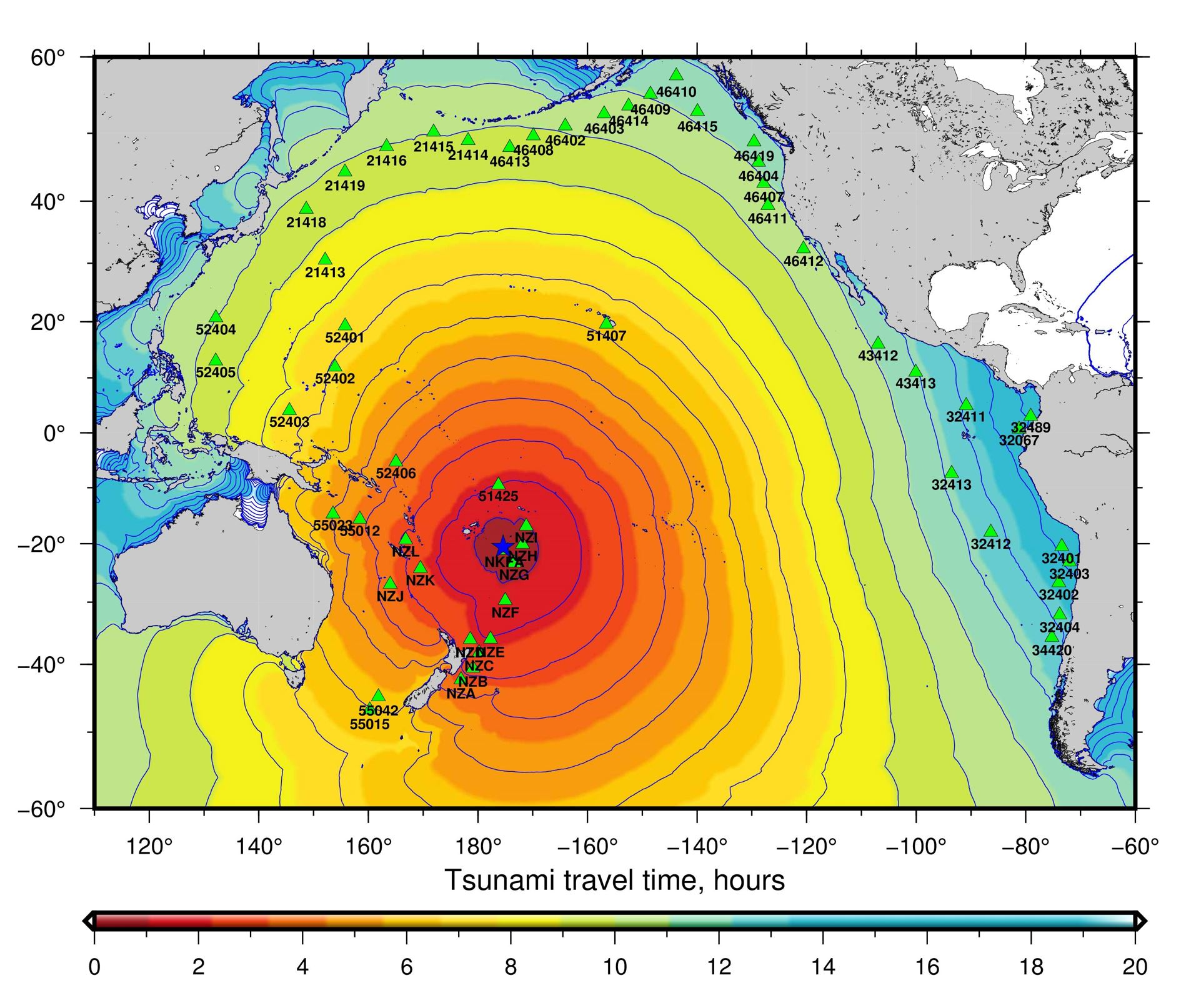
Travel time of the 2022 Hunga Tonga–Hunga Ha'apai tsunami across the Pacific Ocean

Pyroclastic flows can cause tsunamis as a result of them interacting with waterbodies, although the conditions required to generate a tsunami and the mechanisms of interaction between pyroclastic flows and water remain partially elusive. This is because theoretical studies of this complex phenomenon are rare and observations by the scientific community are scarce. It has been demonstrated by Watts and Waythomas (2003) that the dense, basal debris flow component of a pyroclastic flow produces the most energetic and coherent water waves. Smaller waves are theoretically generated by pressure impulses and steam explosions, as well as flow pressure and shear. Discharge rate, transport distance from a volcanic vent, angle of incidence, bulk density of the flow and its preservation or disaggregation underwater are important parameters controlling the interactions between pyroclastic flows and bodies of water. Tsunamis were created by pyroclastic flows during the eruptions of Mount Tambora in 1815, Mount Ruang in 1871, Krakatoa in 1883, Mount Pelée in 1902 and Rabaul Volcano in 1994.

Tsunamis generated by underwater volcanic explosions depend on the energy and water depth of the explosion. An underwater explosion resulting in the formation of a crater can cause subsequent expansion, rise and gravitational collapse to create tidal bores, as well as smaller waves. Most waves caused by underwater volcanic explosions have small amplitudes, an exception being those produced by the 1996 eruption of Karymsky Lake in Russia which reached heights of up to 10 m (33 ft) or more. Although underwater volcanic explosions can generate tsunamis, many are not tsunamigenic. This is especially true for Surtseyan-type phreatomagmatic eruptions, which are the result of complex magma-water interactions. Potentially more tsunamigenic are violent steam explosions that result in the formation of maars and tuff rings.

Tsunamis produced by volcanic shock waves is a rare phenomenon, involving pressure from an explosive eruption that must be high enough to excite free waves in the atmosphere. Such volcanic tsunamis took place during the 1883 eruption of Krakatoa, the 1956 eruption of Bezymianny and the 2022 eruption of Hunga Tonga–Hunga Ha'apai. Shock wave-induced volcanic tsunamis may have also occurred during the Hatepe eruption of Taupō Volcano around 200 CE.

Underwater caldera collapse resulting from large explosive eruptions can cause tsunamis due to subsidence of the water surface. Volcanic tsunamis caused by caldera collapse may have occurred during the Minoan eruption of Santorini in 1638 BCE, the 1650 eruption of Kolumbo and the 1883 eruption of Krakatoa.

=== Volcanic earthquakes ===
Animation of the 1975 Kalapana tsunami

Tsunamis caused by earthquakes preceding or during volcanic eruptions are poorly documented. Such earthquakes can be volcano-tectonic or purely tectonic in origin. Volcano-tectonic earthquakes are caused by the movement of magma beneath the surface, which results in pressure changes where the rock around the magma has experienced stress. They occur as earthquake swarms and are capable of producing small-magnitude tsunamis. Volcano-tectonic earthquakes typically have magnitudes of less than 6 on the surface-wave scale and often precede volcanic eruptions. The 1878 and 1937 eruptions of Rabaul Volcano in Papua New Guinea were reportedly preceded by tsunamis caused by an initial earthquake. Tsunamis caused by volcano-tectonic earthquakes have also occurred at Mount Yasur in 1878, Mount Okmok in 1878 and Kharimkotan in 1933.

Earthquakes caused by tectonic processes at volcanoes are also known to cause tsunamis. Such earthquakes can reach magnitudes greater than 6 and may occur on large thrust faults at the base of volcanic edifices. For example, a M_{s} 7.2 earthquake in Hawaii associated with large-scale slumping of Kīlauea's southern submarine flank caused the 1975 Kalapana tsunami.

=== Slope instabilities ===
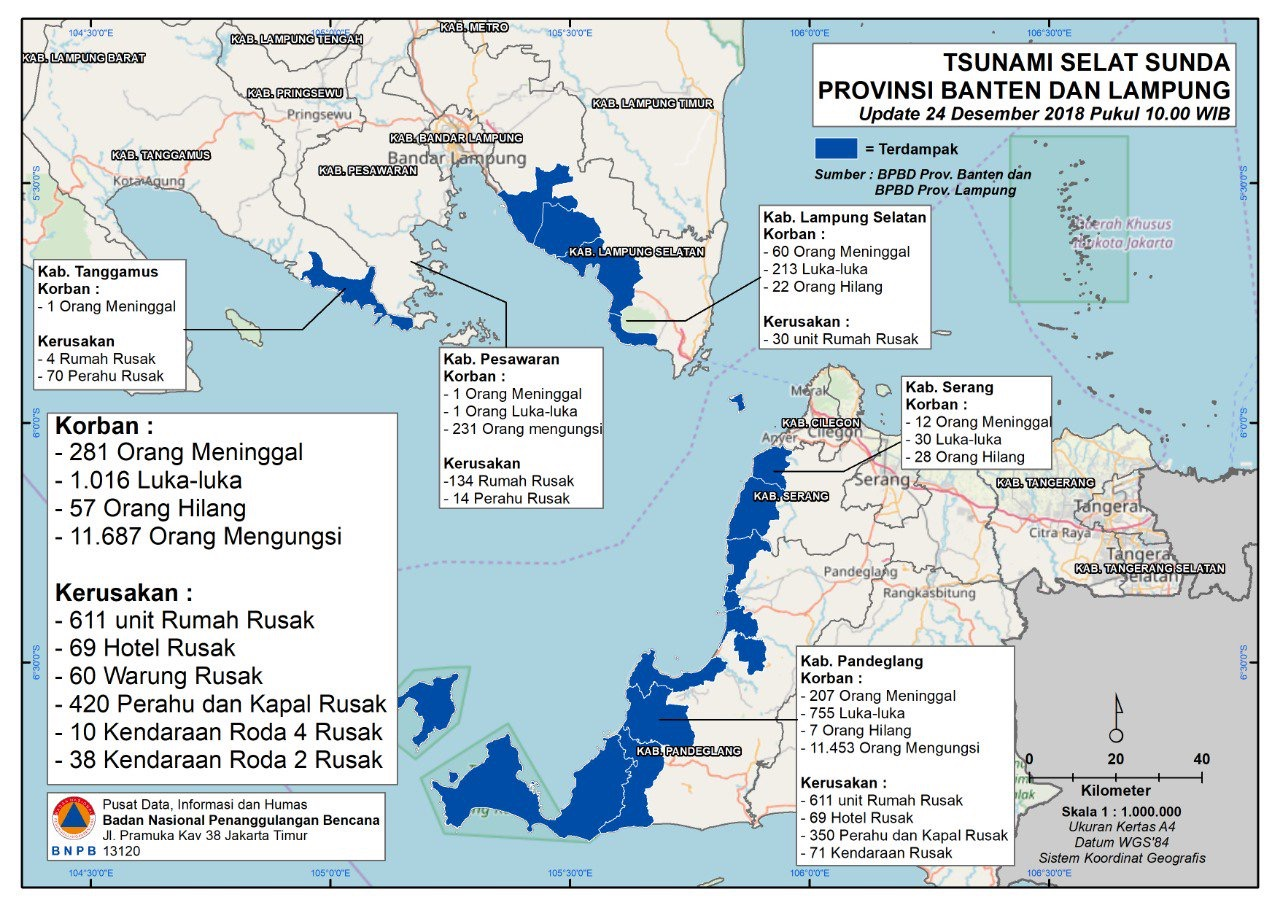
Areas affected by the 2018 Sunda Strait tsunami

The slopes of many volcanoes are naturally unstable due to magmatic intrusions, structural discontinuities, high lava accumulation rates and hydrothermal alteration. Slope failures of volcanic edifices produce a wide spectrum of instability phenomena ranging from rockfalls and small landslides to large debris avalanches. The impact of debris sweeping into a waterbody can produce an impulsive wave which then propagates away from the source. Slope instabilities at volcanoes have accounted for 1% of tsunamis observed since the 17th century.

Tsunamis caused by slope instabilities occurred at Hokkaido Koma-ga-take in 1640, Mount Unzen in 1792, Augustine Volcano in 1883, Ritter Island in 1888, Paluweh in 1928, Iliwerung in 1979, Mount St. Helens in 1980, Vulcano in 1988, Stromboli in 2002 and Anak Krakatoa in 2018.

Some geologists claim that large landslides from volcanic islands may be able to generate megatsunamis that can cross oceans, e.g. Cumbre Vieja on La Palma (Cumbre Vieja tsunami hazard) in the Canary Islands, but this is disputed by many others.

=== Limnic eruptions ===
Limnic eruptions are a very rare phenomenon involving sudden discharges of volcanic gases from deep lake waters. These discharges can cause large water displacements in lakes, triggering lake tsunamis. Lake Nyos, a volcanic crater lake in Cameroon, underwent a limnic eruption on 21 August 1986 when a large amount of carbon dioxide overturned in the lake. The eruption spawned a wave of at least 25 m (82 ft) that swept the shore on one side.

== See also ==
- List of natural disasters by death toll
- List of tsunamis
- Tsunamis in lakes
