= Ginostra (village) =

- Village
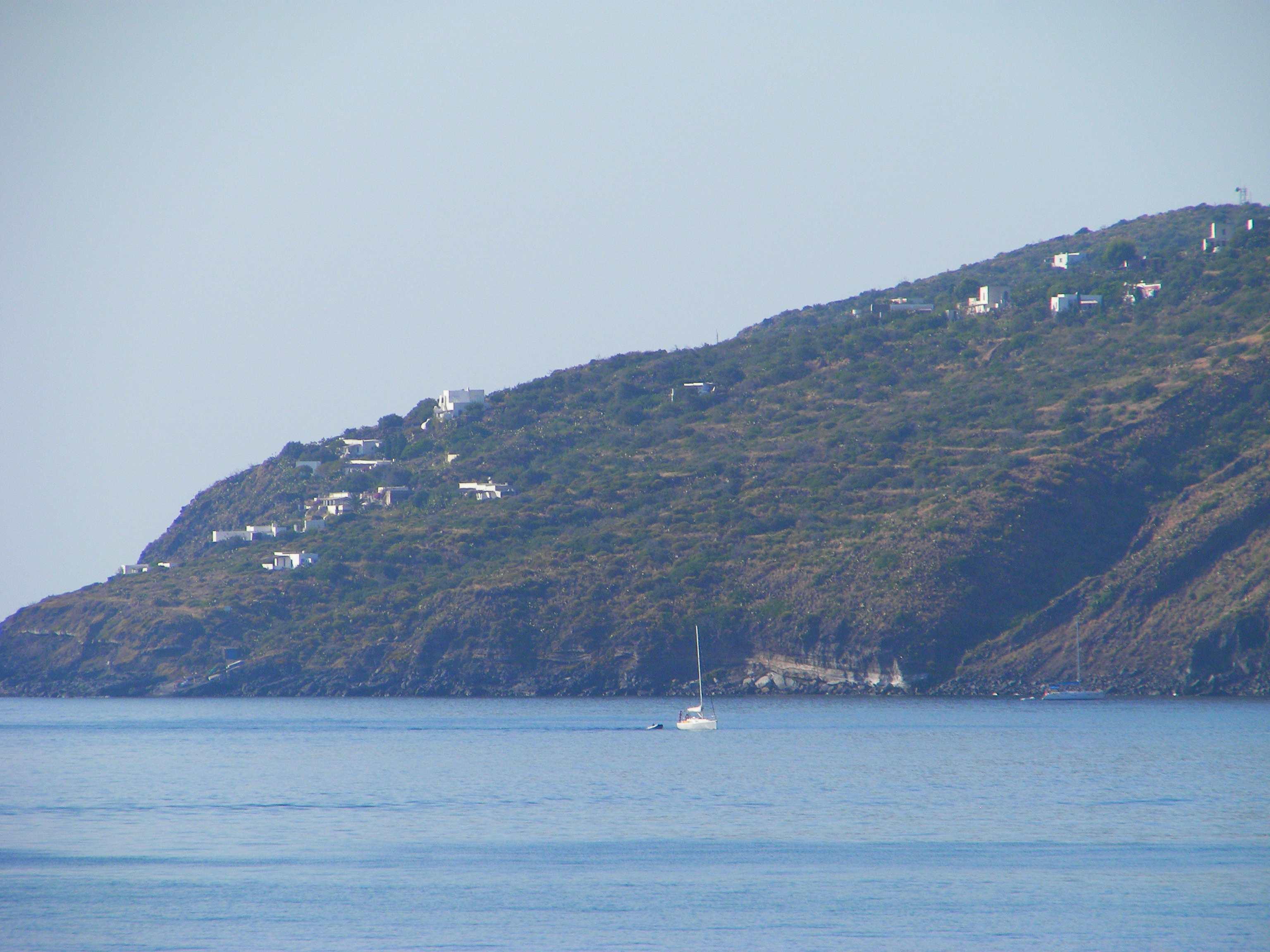
- View of Ginostra from the southeast
- Interactive map of Ginostra
- Coordinates: 38°47′12″N 15°11′28″E
- Country: Italy
- Region: Sicily
- Metropolitan city: Messina
- Comune: Lipari
- Elevation: 50 m (160 ft)

Population (2001)
  - Total: 40
- Postal code: 98052
- Area code: 090

Ginostra is a small village set in a natural ancient theater in the southwest of the island of Stromboli, north to Sicily, southern Italy. The village has about forty permanent residents, and fewer than a dozen mules and donkeys. The tiny village is surrounded by olive, lemon, caper and prickly pear. Structures consists of white stucco buildings similar to those found in other Mediterranean islands such as Santorini.

== Facilities ==
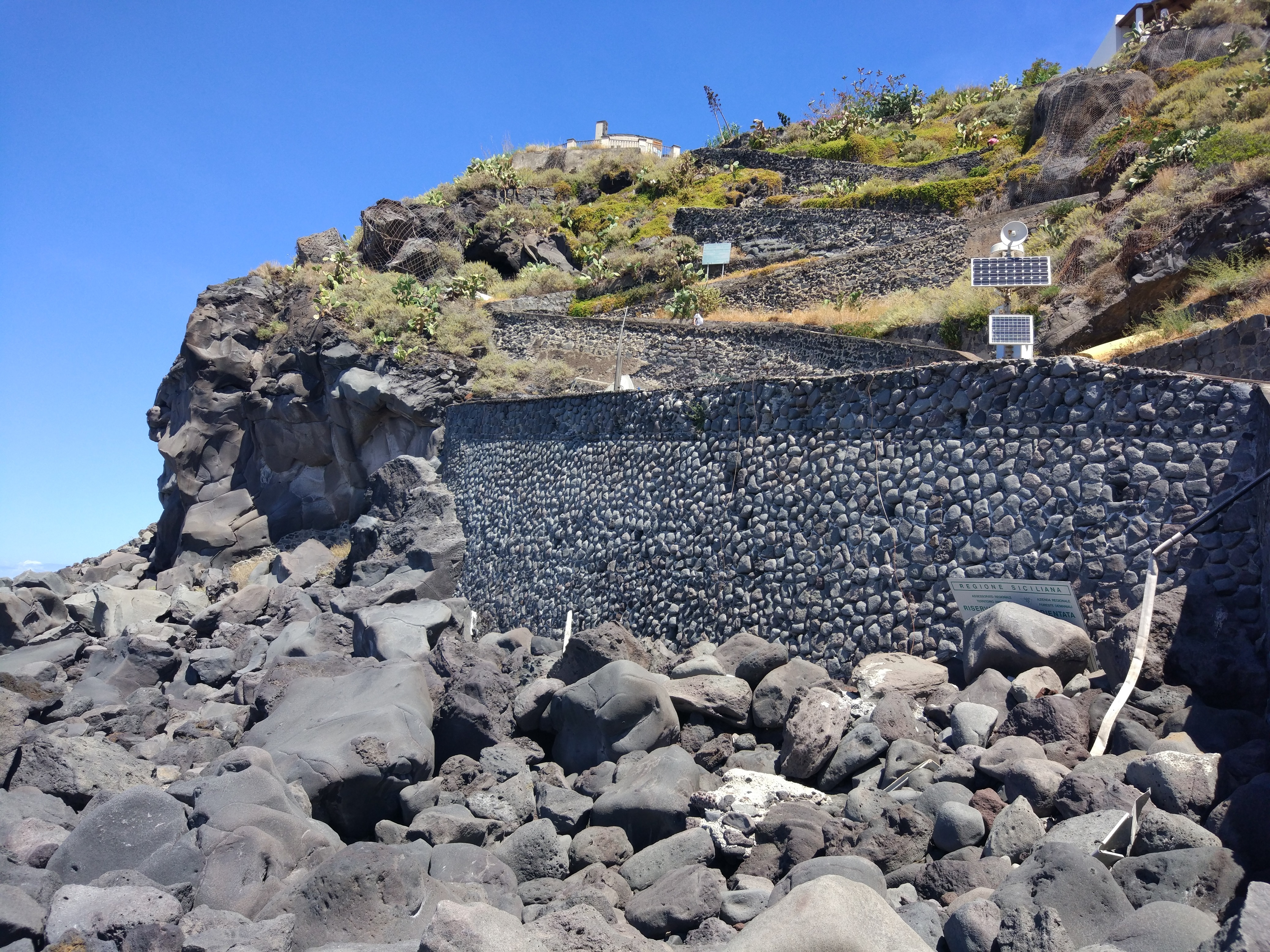
Ginostra from port

Ginostra can only be reached by boat due to a lack of roads or trails on the island. Boats dock at the new pier, opened in December 2004.

Until February 28, 2004, the village had no electricity or running water. Electricity is now supplied by the photovoltaic panels and diesel generators located near the marina, and running water comes from rainwater collected in wells, and is supplemented by ships from Naples. Despite the new electrical grid, there is no street lighting. The village has a single telephone booth.

Life in the village revolves around the plaza outside the church, the grocery store and two restaurants in the bazaar, and the war memorial at the end of the climb from the port. Key public services in the village include a post office and medical facilities. Given the extremely small size of the village, there are no motor vehicles present. Some donkeys are used to carry luggage, particularly uphill from the harbor to the village.

== Tourism ==
Tourism in Ginostra involves hikes on the volcano, and boating and fishing around the island. Ginostra has no real beaches. In summer the population can reach up to 300 people as houses are occupied by tourists.

== See also ==
- Stromboli
