= Iliwerung =

Volcano on Lembata Island, Indonesia

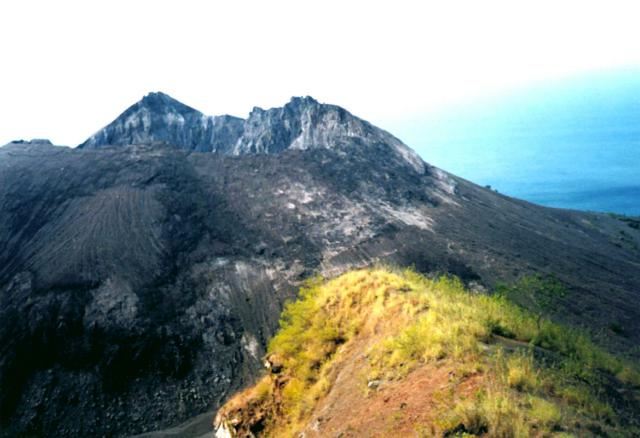

Highest point
- Elevation: 583 m (1,913 ft)
- Coordinates: 8.532°S 123.573°E

Geography
- Location within Indonesia
- Location: Lembata, Indonesia

Geology
- Mountain type: Complex volcano
- Volcanic arc: Sunda Arc
- Last eruption: 2021

Iliwerung or Illiwerung is a complex volcano forming a prominent south-facing peninsula on Lembata Island in southern Indonesia. It contains north-south and northwest-southeast trending lines of craters and lava domes, with the summit dome having formed by a VEI-3 eruption in 1870.

Iliwerung has erupted at least 13 times since 1870, with eruptions having occurred in 1910, 1928, 1948, 1949, 1950, 1951, 1952, 1973-1974, 1976, 1983, 1993, 1999, 2013 and 2021. Eruptions since 1973 have been confined to Hobal, a submarine parasitic vent on Iliwerung's lower east-southeastern flank.

Iliwerung lies on the southern rim of the Lerek caldera. A landslide from Iliwerung in 1979 produced 9 m (30 ft) tsunamis that resulted in more than 500 people killed. In 1983, a tsunami resulting from a submarine eruption caused few deaths.

== See also ==
- List of volcanoes in Indonesia
