= 1979 Lembata tsunami =

Tsunami affecting Indonesia

- Iliwerung (Indonesia)
- Date: 18 July 1979
- Time: 01:00 WIT
- Location: Savu Sea, Indonesia; 8.6°S 123.5°E
- Type: Volcanic tsunami
- Deaths: 539
- Missing: 700

On 18 July 1979, a portion of the Iliwerung volcano on Lembata collapsed into the Savu Sea, triggering a deadly tsunami that swept along the island's coastal villages. The tsunami was triggered by a landslide rather than a volcanic eruption. Estimates of the dead start at 539 while another 700 were reported missing. Many of the dead were never recovered.

== Tsunami characteristics ==
Earlier reports suggested an eruption generated the tsunami which was ruled out as a translation mistake. The cause was later determined to be a landslide along a cape of the island's southern shore. This landslide may have been triggered by an earthquake of unknown magnitude recorded by a seismic observatory in Kupang on 18 July at 00:42. Local newspapers Kompas and Suara Karya said the tsunami occurred at 01:00 local time. The tsunami inundated up to 1.5 km (0.93 mi) inland, sweeping across four settlements. The total landslide volume was estimated at 50 × 10 m^{3} which originated from the volcano's eastern portion; one-third of the volcano fell into the sea. Waves of 7–9 m (23–30 ft) swept into Labala and Waiteba Bays. The landslide crown is situated at an elevation of 200 m (660 ft) near the village of Atakore on Bauraja Hill. This hill represents an ancient volcanic crater of the Iliwerung volcano, and is especially vulnerable to landslides after heavy downpour. Remnants of the landslide are still visible via satellite imagery. In some areas, the tsunami deposited up to 2 m (6 ft 7 in) of sand on the affected villages.

== Impact ==
News of the tsunami reached Jakarta three days later due to the absence of well-established communication networks. The tsunami destroyed several settlements, some located 150 m (490 ft) inland. The lack of roads connecting the affected villages of Lembata made rescue works difficult. According to Ben Midol, the governor of East Nusa Tenggara, food and medical aid were quickly supplied to the region. The waves which destroyed the villages of Waiteba, Lebala and Bala struck when most of the population was asleep. In one area of the island, 60 bodies were discovered. On 23 July, the Indonesian military said the death toll could be between 650 and 750, though at the time, the death toll only stood at 155.

The reported death toll rose to 539 the following day, though only 175 bodies were found by rescue workers. An additional 700 people were thought to be missing. Many of the estimated dead were people missing and presumed killed. Some people were also killed after being buried by the landslide. In addition to homes being razed, several primary schools and markets were also in ruins. Many of the victims were buried in mass graves. Thousands of panicked inhabitants from nine villages on the island abandoned their homes citing fear after the disaster. Despite the local authorities' efforts, they could not stop the mass evacuations. These villagers fled to Lewoleba in the central part of the island, causing housing concerns. A human body found inside a shark caught off Rote Island one week after the disaster may have been a tsunami victim. According to Suara Karya, citing a medical examiner, the body belonged to a male who had been dead for two days before being swallowed by the shark.
