= Sciara del Fuoco =

Talus scree on Stromboli

Coordinates: 38°47′55″N 15°12′25″E

Sciara del Fuoco is a talus scree or depression located on Stromboli Island in Italy. It runs along the island's northern flank and is bounded by two ridges. It now serves as a major tourist attraction on the island.

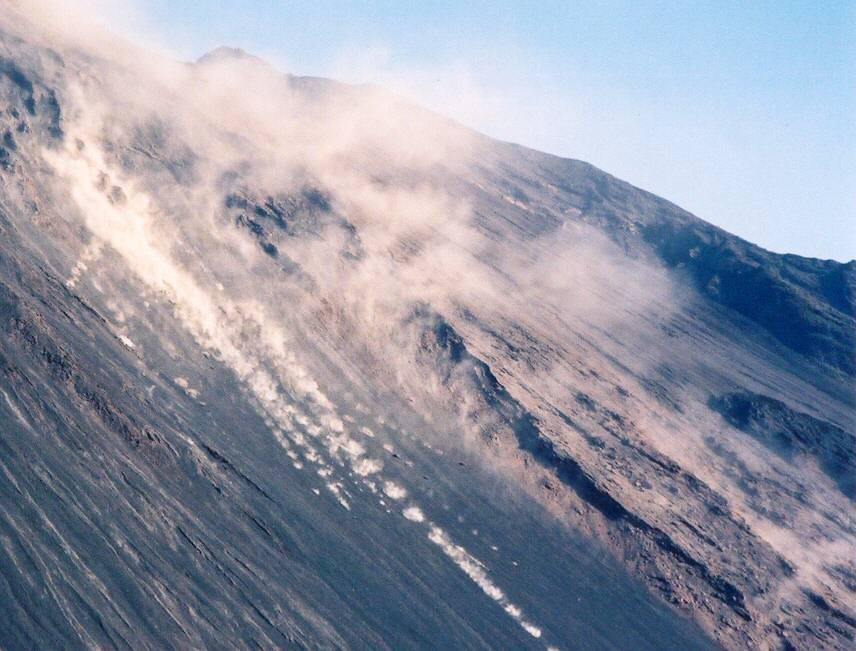
A photo of Sciara del Fuoco

== Formation ==
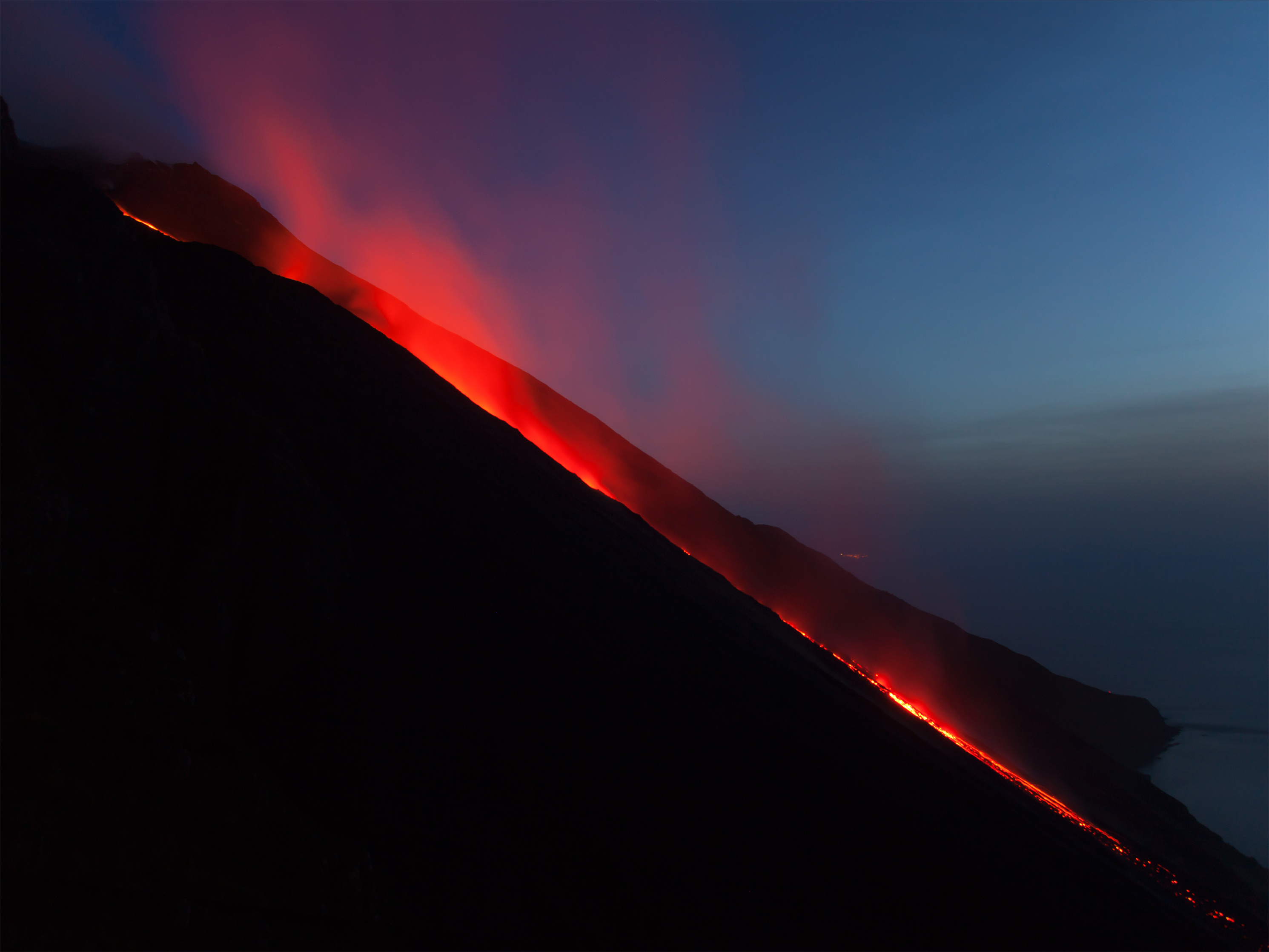
Sciara del Fuoco in September 2014

Sciara del Fuoco was formed as a result of a sector collapse around 5,000 years ago. Due to this, it is sometimes referred to as a scar. It was formed by lava, lapilli, and incandescent waste.
