= Stromboli =

Active volcanic island off the coast of Sicily, Italy

Stromboli Struògnuli (Sicilian) Στρογγύλη (Greek)
- Island
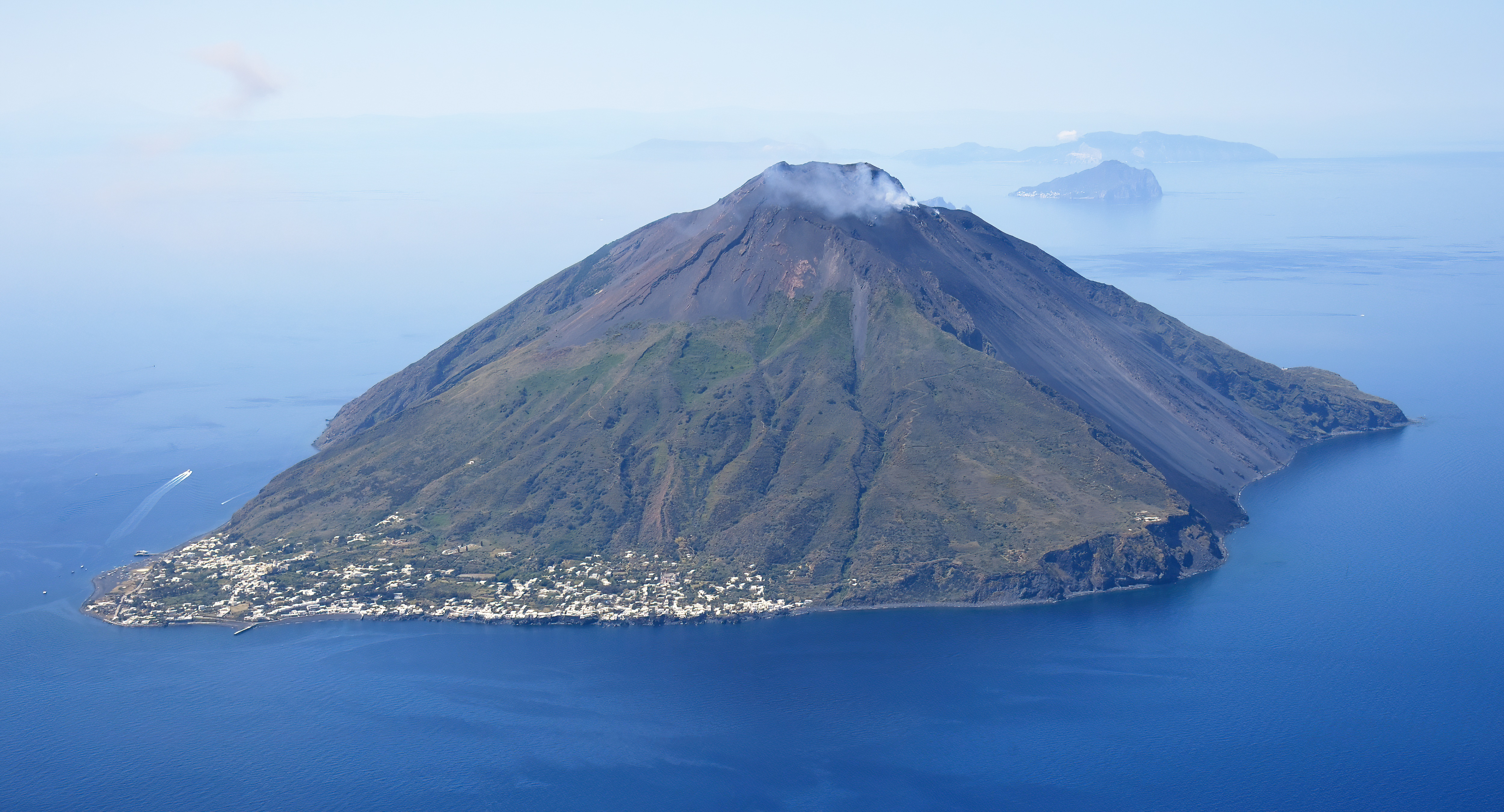
- Aerial view of Stromboli from the northeast; to the right, the Sciara del Fuoco can be seen.

- Location within Sicily Location within Italy Location within Europe
- Coordinates: 38°47′38″N 15°12′40″E
- Country: Italy
- Island grouping: Aeolian Islands
- Region: Sicily

Area
  - Total: 12.6 km^{2} (4.9 sq mi)
- Elevation: 924 m (3,031 ft)

Population (2016)
  - Total: 500

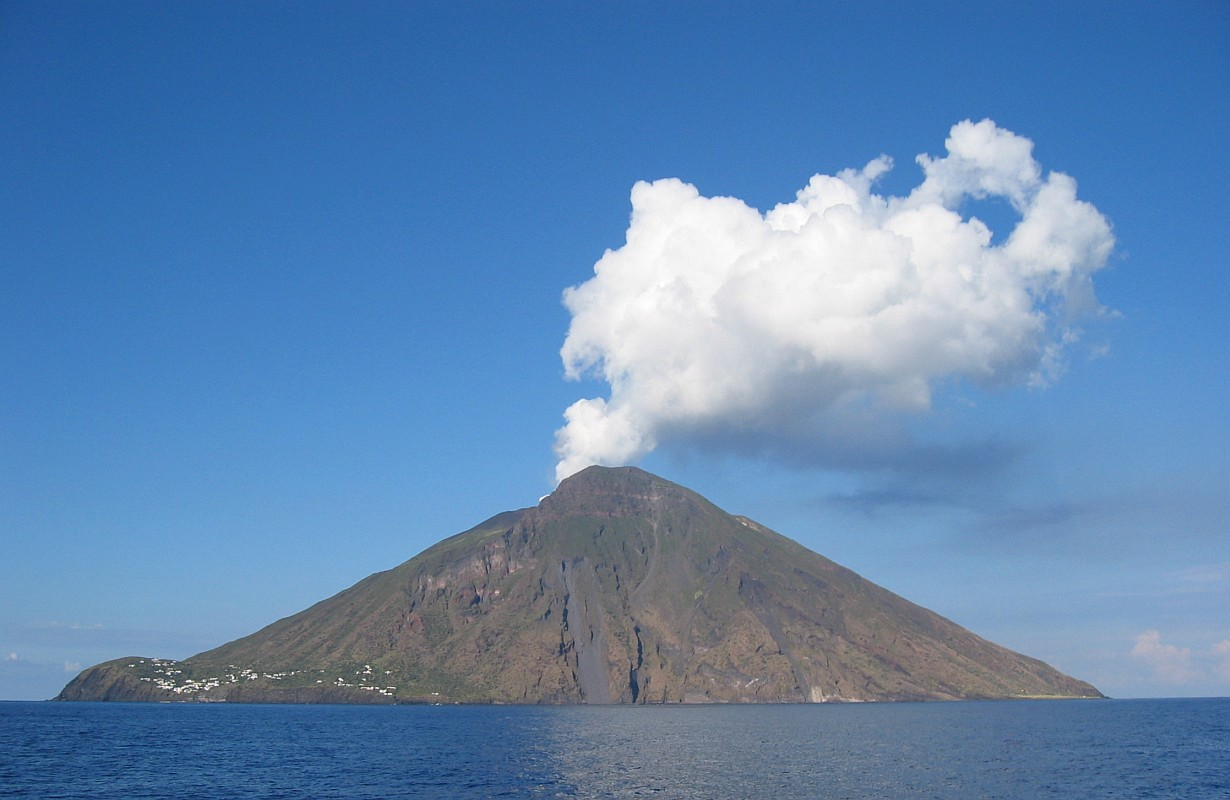
September 2004 Stromboli eruption

Stromboli (/ˈstrɒmbəli/ STROM-bə-lee, Italian: [ˈstromboli]; Sicilian: Struògnuli [ˈʂː(ɽ)wɔɲɲʊlɪ]) is an island in the Tyrrhenian Sea, off the north coast of Sicily, containing Mount Stromboli, one of the four active volcanoes in Italy. It is one of the seven Aeolian Islands, a volcanic arc north of Sicily, and the mythological home of Aeolus.

The island, with an area of 12.6 square kilometres (4.9 sq mi), represents the upper third of the volcano. Its population was about 500 as of 2016. The volcano has erupted many times and is constantly active with minor eruptions, often visible from many points on the island and from the surrounding sea, giving rise to the island's nickname "Lighthouse of the Mediterranean".

== Etymology ==
The name Stromboli is derived from the Ancient Greek name Strongýlē (Στρογγύλη), which was derived from strongýlos (στρογγύλος 'round'), after the volcano's round, conical appearance when seen from a distance.

== Height and shape ==
Stromboli stands 926 metres (3,038 ft) above sea level, and over 2,700 metres (8,900 ft) above the sea floor.

The area of Stromboli island is 12.6 square kilometres (4.9 sq mi).

As of June 2024, there are two active craters at the peak, each with multiple vents showing volcanic activity and lava flows.

The Sciara del Fuoco ("stream of fire") is a large horseshoe-shaped depression created in the last 13,000 years by several collapses on the northwestern side of the cone. Approximately 2 kilometres (1 1/4 miles) northeast lies Strombolicchio, the volcanic plug remnant of the original volcano.

== Volcano ==
Eruption of Stromboli

Mount Stromboli has been in almost continuous eruption for the past 2,000–5,000 years; its last serious one occurred on 11 September 1930 when 6 people were killed. In a typical eruption, explosions occur at the summit craters, with mild to moderate eruptions of incandescent volcanic bombs, a type of tephra, at intervals ranging from minutes to hours. This pattern of Strombolian eruption is also observed at other volcanoes worldwide.

Eruptions from the summit craters typically result in a few short, mild, but energetic bursts, ranging up to a few hundred meters in height, containing ash, incandescent lava fragments, and stone blocks. Stromboli's activity is almost exclusively explosive, but lava flows do occur at times of high volcanic activity: an effusive eruption occurred in 2002, the first in 17 years, and again in 2003, 2007, and 2013–14. Volcanic gas emissions are measured by a multi-component gas analyzer, which detects pre-eruptive degassing of rising magma, improving prediction of volcanic activity.

On 3 July 2019, two major explosive events occurred at around 16:46 local time, alongside 20 additional minor explosive events identified by Italy's National Institute of Geophysics and Volcanology. A hiker near the volcano's summit died after being struck by flying debris when the eruption began, and an additional 6 people suffered minor injuries.

On 28 August 2019, at 10:16 local time, an explosive eruption sent a pyroclastic flow down the volcano's northern flank and into the sea, where it continued for several hundred meters before collapsing. The resulting ash column rose to 2,000 m (6,600 ft).

On 4 July 2024, Stromboli erupted together with Mount Etna, and the Italian Civil Protection Department (Protezione Civile) issued the highest alert level.

== Settlements ==
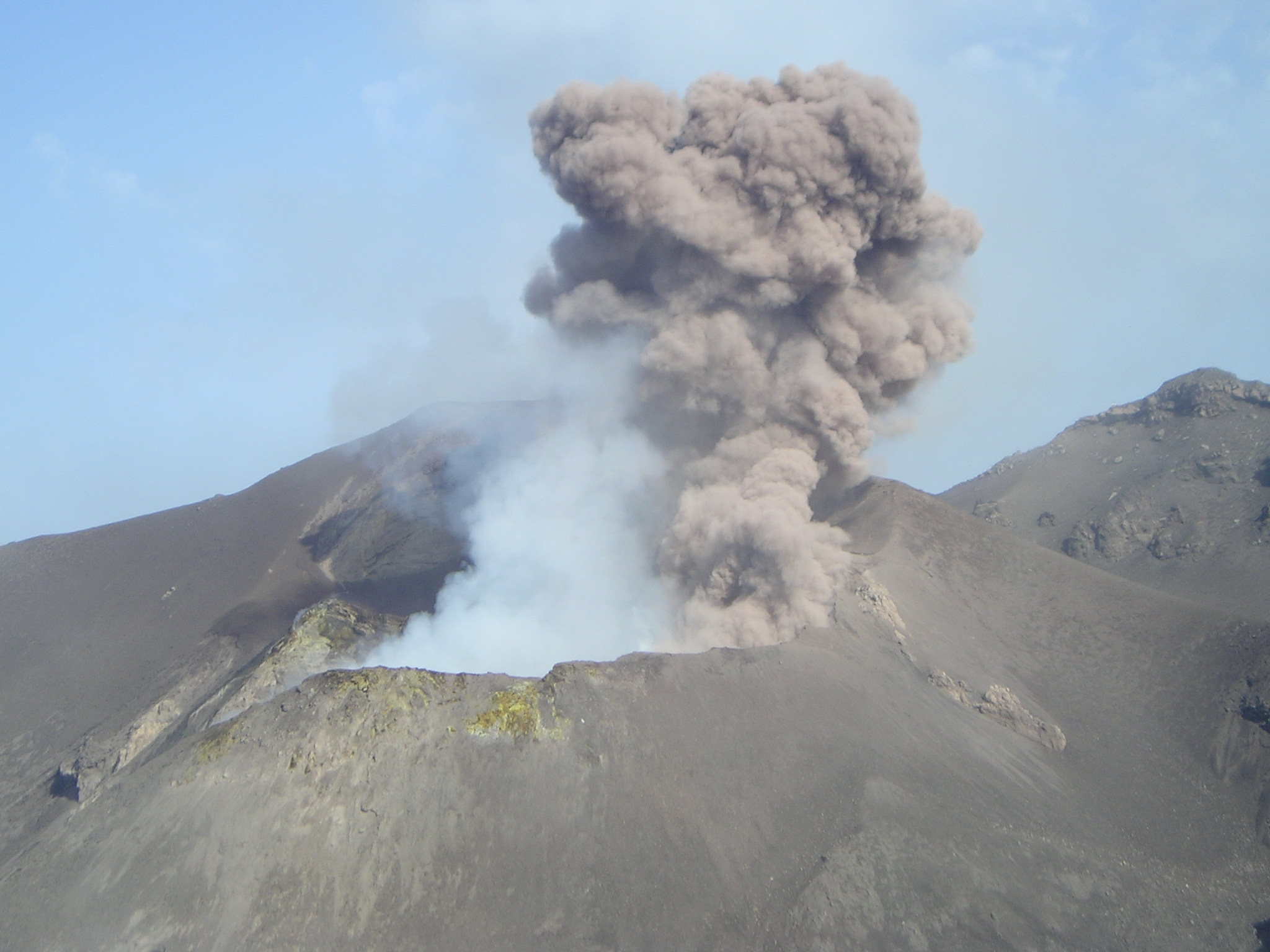
From a helicopter

Two villages, San Bartolo and San Vincenzo, lie in the northeast, while the smaller village Ginostra lies in the southwest. Administratively, they are one of the frazioni (unit of a commune and municipality) of Lipari, Messina.

In the early 20th century, a few thousand people inhabited the island, but after several waves of emigration, the population has numbered a few hundred since the mid-1950s. The population on the island was about 500 as of 2016.

In addition to Italian, the Aeolian dialect (a derivative of Sicilian) is generally spoken on this and the other Aeolian islands.

== In popular culture ==
- In Journey to the Center of the Earth (1864) by Jules Verne, the conclusion of the novel is set on Stromboli.
- Author J. R. R. Tolkien identified his fictional volcano Mount Doom in Mordor with the volcano of Stromboli, according to scholar Clyde S. Kilby.
- Stromboli (1950), also known as Stromboli, Land of God, is an Italian-American film set on Stromboli, directed by Roberto Rossellini and starring Ingrid Bergman.
- Rising Appalachia's 2015 song "Stromboli" was written on and titled after the island. The studio version appears on Wider Circles (2015), and a live version appears on Alive.
- The lyrics of the Woody Guthrie song "Ingrid Bergman" (set to music & released on the 1998 album Mermaid Avenue by Billy Bragg & Wilco) focus on images of the actress in the Rossellini film Stromboli, and erotic references to the island's volcanic nature.
- An Italian-American savory pastry is named stromboli after the island.
- The novel The Book of the Dead, written by Douglas Preston and Lincoln Child features the island as part of its conclusion.
- The film The Hand of God features a trip to the volcanic island with the protagonist & his brother following on from their parents death; on the island the protagonist, Fabietto, searches for meaning whilst his brother decides to prioritise pleasure or "La Dolce Vita".
- Stromboli is also the name of a major antagonist in Disney’s 1940 animated feature film Pinocchio.
- Czech rock band Stromboli, featuring the singer Bára Basiková and the guitar player Michal Pavlíček, was named after the volcano

== See also ==
- 2002 Stromboli tsunami
- List of islands of Italy
- Vulcano (Sicily)
