= Madeleine Cavalier =

French archaeologist and researcher

- Born: 27 June 1928; Vacquières
- Other names: la signorina francese
- Spouse(s): Luigi Bernabò Brea
- Awards: CNRS silver medal (1985); Bronze Medal of the Italian Order of Merit for Culture and Art (1957); Commander of the Order of Merit of the Italian Republic (1999); Chevalier des Arts et des Lettres (2006)
- Position held: Director of Research at CNRS

Madeleine Cavalier, also known in Italy by her nickname "signorina francese", born on June 27, 1928, is a French archaeologist and researcher at the French National Centre for Scientific Research (CNRS). Throughout her long career, she focused primarily on the Aeolian Islands, conducting extensive excavations there.

Together with Luigi Bernabò Brea, a very close collaborator who was briefly her husband, she was responsible for the establishment of the Aeolian Archaeological Museum of Lipari.

== Biography ==
She was born on June 27, 1928, in Vacquières, Hérault. Despite not obtaining her baccalauréat, it didn't prevent her from pursuing studies at the University of Montpellier without obtaining a degree. She later directed the excavations of Milazzo in 1951–1952. In the same year, she became the secretary-general of the French section of the International Institute of Ligurian Studies.

Subsequently, she was hired as a research associate at CNRS and, with the assistance of the French School of Athens and the French Institute of Lebanon, undertook a series of excavations in Cyprus, Greece, Lebanon, and Turkey. She conducted excavations in Lemnos, among other places.

The fruit of her research during this period in Greece focused on the relationships between prehistoric cultures in Greece and the Aeolian Islands. This work is detailed in an article dating back to 1960. The Aeolian Islands were actually the preferred subject of Madeleine Cavalier's study, and she devoted a significant part of her scientific output to them. Through the analysis of excavated amphorae and workshops, she discovered, for example, that the island of Lipari derived its economic prosperity from the production of alum, which was then stored in amphorae for sale and transportation. It was one of the few non-food products transported in amphorae at the time. Her work was also crucial for understanding the unique linguistic aspects of the Aeolian Islands, both in relation to Greek and Latin.

She married her colleague Luigi Bernabò Brea for a season, but the marriage did not last. Nevertheless, the two continued to be close professional collaborators until Luigi Bernabo Brea's death.

The opening of CNRS after the political changes following May 68 allowed her to join the institution even without a diploma or the baccalauréat, and she gradually climbed the ranks of the institution. In 1980–1981, she conducted excavations in San Vincenzo on the island of Stromboli.

In Italy, she earned the nickname "signorina francese" among the Italian population, meaning the 'French damsel', during her field research. However, her research was not limited to Italy. For example, in 2009, she published "Les petites mains", a work dedicated to her ancestors in the town of Vacquières.

In 1985, she was awarded the CNRS Silver Medal for her research and academic work. She became a commander of the Order of Merit of the Italian Republic on 12 April 1999 and was honored with the Order of Arts and Letters in 2007.

She also co-founded the Aeolian Archaeological Museum of Lipari with Luigi Bernabò Brea.

== Legacy ==
En 2003, Pierre Vidal-Naquet revisited her figure, crediting her as having been an "extraordinary woman" and connecting her to his own vocation as a historian. In 2018, a book in her honor was published, featuring contributions from numerous researchers, including Maria Bernabò Brea and Massimo Cultraro.

== Decorations ==
- Commander of the Order of Merit of the Italian Republic (Italy)
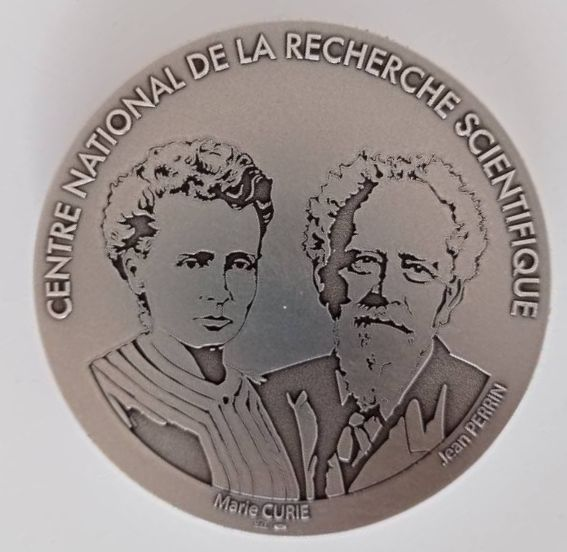
- CNRS Silver Medal (France)
- Knight of the Ordre des Arts et des Lettres (France)
