= Auson (king) =

Auson (Ancient Greek: Αὔσων) was in some stories of Greek mythology a son of Odysseus and Calypso or Circe. He was the first king of Ausones and also Ausonia derived its name from him. His son Liparus, founded and gave his name to Lipara.

According to other legends, the Ausones were named after Auson, the son of Italus and Leutaria; others say they were named after Auson, the son of Atlas and Calypso; still others claim that they were named after a different figure called Auson.

The historian Dionysius of Halicarnassus, in enumerating the sons of Odysseus by Circe, does not mention Auson as being one of them.
