= Ausones =

Ancient Italic tribes in Italy

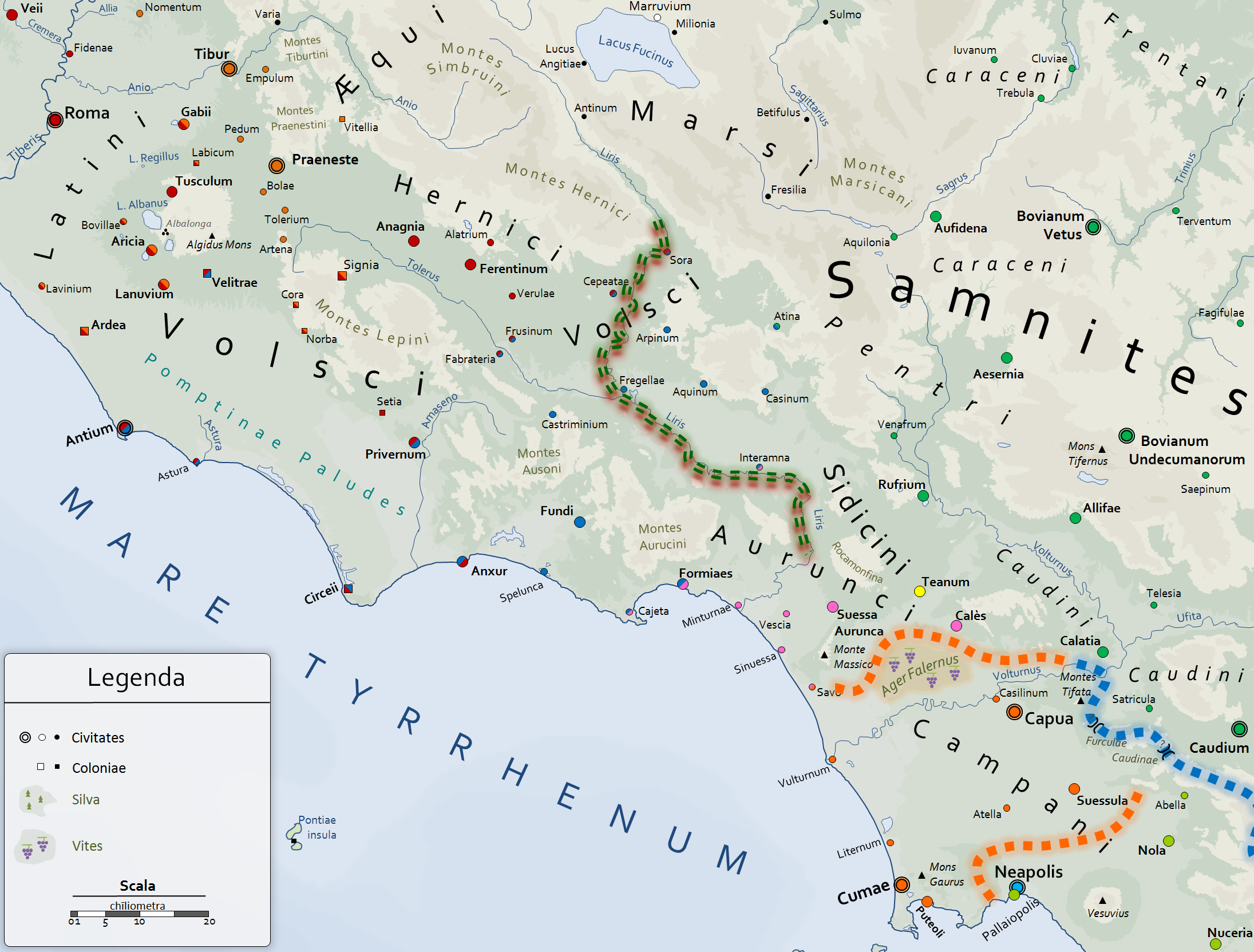
The territory of the Aurunci.

"Ausones" (Ancient Greek: Αὔσονες; Italian: Ausoni), the original name and the extant Greek form for the Latin "Aurunci", was a name applied by Greek writers to describe various Italic peoples inhabiting the regions of Southern Italy and Central Italy. The term was used, specifically, to denote the particular tribe which Livy termed the Aurunci, but later it was applied to all Italians, and Ausonia became a poetic term, in Greek and Latin, for Italy itself.

== Name ==
According to some legends, the Ausones were named after Auson, the son of Odysseus and Circe or Calypso, who was also said to have been their king. Auson's son was Liparus, from whom the Lipari Islands derive their name.

According to other legends, the Ausones were named after Auson, the son of Italus and Leutaria; others say they were named after Auson, the son of Atlas and Calypso; still others claim that they were named after a different figure called Auson.

== Usage ==
The usage, by ancient writers, in regard to national appellations is very vague and fluctuating, perhaps in no instance more so than in the case of the Ausones or Ausonians.

=== As synonymous with "Aurunci" ===
Originally, "Aurunci" was the appellation given by the Romans to the people called "Ausones" by the Greeks: Indeed, the two names are merely different forms of the same, as around the 4th century BC, Latin medial "s" (at this point representing [z]) shifted to “r” (pronounced [r]). (Aurunci = Auronici = Auruni = Ausuni). The identity of the two is distinctly asserted by Servius, and clearly implied by Cassius Dio, where he says that the name of Ausonia was properly applied only to the land of the Auruncans, between the Volscians and the Campanians. Nevertheless, it does not appear that the name "Aurunci" was ever employed by the Romans in the vague and extensive sense in which that of "Ausones" was used by the Greeks.

Further, it seems, by the later period of the fourth century BC, that the Romans came to distinguish the two names as applying to two separate political tribes of the same race. Evidently two parts of one people, both dwelling on the frontiers of Latium and Campania. For more details on this see Aurunci.

=== As synonymous with "Oscans" ===
It is possible the Ausonians may have also been identical with the Oscans (Opicans), as they were occasionally referred to by the same name. Aristotle expressly states that the part of Italy towards Tyrrhenia was inhabited by the Opicans, "who were called, both formerly and in his time, by the additional name of Ausones". Antiochus of Syracuse stated, that Campania was at first occupied by the Opicans, "who were also called Ausonians". Hecataeus also seems to have had the same opinion as Antiochus, as he termed Nola in Campania "a city of the Ausones ".

Polybius, on the contrary, regarded the two nations as different and spoke of Campania as inhabited by the Ausonians and Opicans. This does not necessarily prove that they were really distinct, as some authors mention the Opicans and Oscans as if they were two different nations when they are clearly the same.

However, the use of "Ausones" as identical with that of the Opicans may simply be due to the fact that "Ausones" was used as a vague term for all inhabitants of the Italian peninsula, as stated above.

=== As a General Term ===
Indeed, it is probable that the Greeks frequently applied the name with little regard to accuracy, and may have included races widely different under the common appellation of Ausonians, but it is impossible to account for this vague and general use of the name, unless the people to whom it referred shared many attributes and formed an important part of the population of central Italy. The precise relation in which they were considered as having to the Opicans or Oscans it is impossible to determine, nor perhaps were the ideas of the Greeks themselves about this very clear and definite. The passages already cited prove that they were considered as occupying the western coast of Campania, on which account the Lower Sea (Mare Inferum, as it was termed by the Romans), known subsequently as the Tyrrhenian Sea, was in early ages commonly termed by the Greeks the Ausonian Sea. (Note: "Pliny, on the contrary (iii. 5 s. 10,10. s. 15), and, if we may trust his authority, Polybius also, applied the name of Ausonhim Mare, to the sea on the SE. of Italy, from Sicily to the Iapygian Promontory, but this is certainly at variance with tho customary usage of the term" (Bunbury 1854b, p. 345).) Other accounts, however, represent them as originally an inland people, dwelling in the mountains about Beneventum. Scymnus of Chios also writes of them as occupying an inland region; and Strabo states that they had occupied the mountain tract above the Pontine marshes, and in Roman history only with Volscians.

On the whole, the name was probably applied with little discrimination to all the native races who, before the invasion of the Samnites, occupied Campania and the inland mountainous region afterwards known as Samnium, and from thence came to be gradually applied to all the inhabitants of central Italy. But they seem to have been regarded by the best authorities as distinct from the Oenotrians, or Pelasgic nations, which inhabited the southern parts of the peninsula; though other authors certainly confounded them. Hellanicus of Lesbos, according to Dionysius of Halicarnassus wrote of the Ausonians as crossing over into Sicily under their king Siculus, where the people meant are clearly the Siculi. Again, Strabo wrote of Temesa as founded by the Ausones, where he must probably mean the Oenotrians, the only people whom we know of as inhabiting these regions before the arrival of the Greeks.

The use of the name of Ausonia for the whole Italian peninsula was merely poetical, at least it is not found in any extant prose writer; and Dionysius indicates that it was used by the Greeks in very early times, associates it with Hesperia and Saturnia, both of them obviously poetical appellations. Lycophron, though he does not use the name of Ausonia, repeatedly applies the adjective "Ausontan" both to the country and people, apparently as equivalent to "Italian"; for he includes under the appellation, Arpi in Apulia, Agylla in Etruria, the neighbourhood of Cumae in Campania, and the banks of the Crathis in Lucania. Apollonius Rhodius, a little later, seems to use the name of Ausonia precisely in the sense in which it is employed by Dionysius Periegetes and other Greek poets of later times (for the whole Italian peninsula). It was probably only adopted by the Alexandrian writers as a poetical equivalent for Italia, a name which is not found in any poets of that period. From them, the name of Ausonia was adopted by the Roman poets in the same sense, and at a later period became not uncommon even in prose writers. The etymology of the name of Ausones is uncertain, but it seems not improbable that it is originally connected with the same root as Oscus or Opicus.

== History ==
The first Greek settlers found Italy inhabited by three major populations: Ausones, Oenotrians and Iapyges. The Ausones spoke an Indo-European language.

=== Continental Ausones ===
The core of the Ausonian people lived in a territory termed Ausonia: during the 8th century BC it included what is now southern Lazio and Campania until the Sele river.

In one passage Livy speaks of Cales as their chief city; but a little later, he tells us that they had three cities, Ausona, Minturnae, and Vescia, all of which seem to have been situated in the plains bordering on the Liris, not far from its outlet. At this period, they were certainly an inconsiderable tribe and were able to offer but little resistance to the Romans. Their city of Cales was captured, and soon after occupied by a Roman colony, 333 BC; and though a few years afterwards the success of the Samnites at Lautulae induced them to rebel, their three remaining towns were easily reduced by the Roman consuls, and their inhabitants put to the sword. On this occasion, Livy tells us that "the Ausonian nation was destroyed"; It is certain that its name does not again appear in history, and is only noticed by Pliny among the extinct races which had formerly inhabited Latium.

According to different classical sources the Ausones were also settled in Calabria.

The Ausones allied with the Samnites against the Romans. The main Ausonian cities of Ausona, Minturnae, Vescia and Sinuessa, according to Livy were destroyed.

=== Ausones in the Aeolian Islands and Sicily ===
From 1240 to 850 BC, the Aeolian Islands were occupied by a group of Ausones brought there by the legendary Liparus. According to a legend Liparus is succeeded by Aeolus whose house, according to Homer, gave hospitality to Odysseus. This continuous occupation may have been interrupted violently when, during the late 9th century BC, the Ausonian civilisation site, Lipara, on the island of Lipari was burned and apparently not rebuilt. Around 1270 BC part of the Ausones relocated from Campania to Sicily.

The excavations on Lipari have revealed an assemblage which shares many features with those of contemporary Southern Italy (in its Subapennine-Protovillanovan phases). This insular culture has been named as Ausonian I (1250/1200–1150 BC) and II (1150–850 BC) and associated with the Pantalica I and II (Cassibile) phases in Sicily (See Luigi Bernabò Brea).

== Archaeological findings ==
Cales, in the commune of Calvi Risorta (province of Caserta, Campania), of which remains have been found, has been identified as an Ausonian city.

In the park of Roccamonfina, remains of a line of polygonal masonry walls belonging to the Ausonian civilization have been discovered.

== See also ==
- Aborigines
- Aurunci
- Osci
- List of ancient Italic peoples
