= Bernabò =

Bernabò is an Italian given name and surname, a variant of Barnabas. Notable people with the name include:

- Bernabò Visconti (1323–1385), Italian soldier
- Valerio Bernabò (born 1984), Italian rugby union player
- Luigi Bernabò Brea (1910–1999), Italian archaeologist
