= Panarea =

- Island
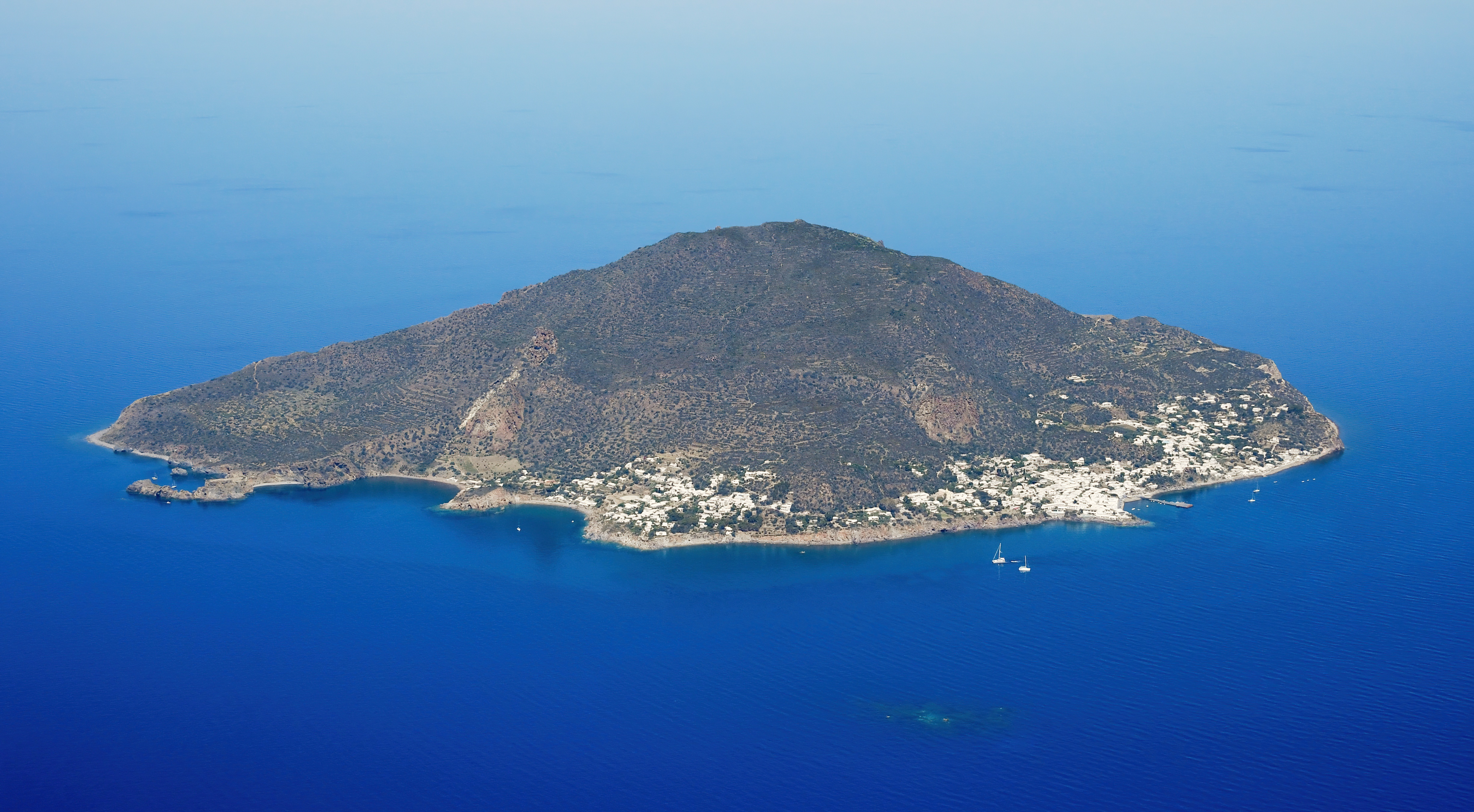
- Aerial view of Panarea from the southeast

- Location in Italy
- Coordinates: 38°38′15″N 15°04′00″E
- Country: Italy
- Province: Messina
- Comune: Lipari

Area
  - Total: 3.4 km^{2} (1.3 sq mi)
- Highest elevation: 421 m (1,381 ft)

Population
  - Total: 280
  - Density: 82/km^{2} (210/sq mi)

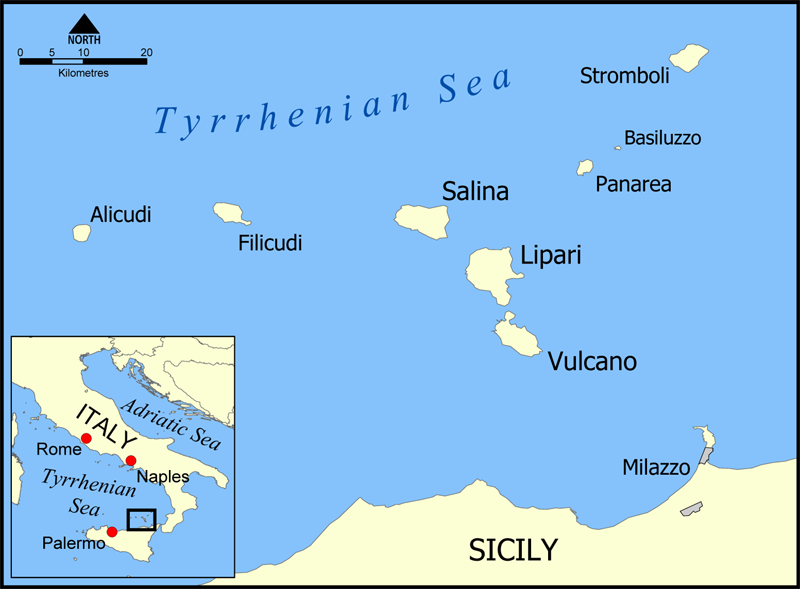
The Aeolian Islands.

Panarea (Italian pronunciation: [panaˈrɛːa]; Sicilian: Panarìa) is the smallest of the seven inhabited Aeolian Islands, a volcanic island chain in north of Sicily, southern Italy. It is a frazione of the comune of Lipari. There are currently about 280 residents living on the island year-round; however the population increases dramatically in summer with the influx of tourists especially during the months of July and August. In recent years, the island has become known internationally for its celebrity visitors.

== Geography ==
The island is an active volcano with a total surface area of only 3.4 km^{2} (1.3 sq mi). The highest point on the island, Punta del Corvo, is 421 m (1,381 ft) above sea level. There are thermal springs near the village of Punta di Peppe e Maria. Scuba diving is a popular excursion on this tiny island, and one can even swim to a shipwreck between the offshore rocks of Lisca Bianca and Bottaro.

The island is surrounded by several islets and skerries reachable only by boat that make Panarea unique and easily distinguishable between the other Aeolian islands.

These islets and skerries are: Basiluzzo and Spinazzola, Pietra Nave, Dattilo, Lisca Bianca and Bottaro, Lisca Nera, Le Formiche.

== History ==
In antiquity, the island was named "Euonymos"; the nearby islet of Basiluzzo, administered from Panarea, was named "Hycesia". There is archaeological evidence on the island dating back to Greek inhabitants (~1200 BC); later the island was settled by Romans. There were people still living on the island until pirates and other Mediterranean raiders made life unbearable after the fall of the Western Roman Empire.

In 2010, the Hellenistic shipwreck known as Panarea III was identified north of Panarea. Dated to the late 3rd century BC, the wreck rests at a depth of about 112 meters. Its cargo, chiefly wine amphorae together with other goods, points to maritime commerce between southern Italy and Sicily around the Second Punic War.

== Tourism and culture ==
In modern times, Panarea has become a fashionable vacation spot. In 2011, it was described by W magazine as "the epicenter of the chicest summer scene in the Mediterranean."

Panarea and the entire Aeolian chain were declared a UNESCO World Heritage Site in 2000. Largely because of this, construction and development are strictly regulated and the community retains its storied insularity. Most residences admit only temporary occupancy, and the few year-round homes available are highly expensive and difficult to obtain.

== Gallery ==
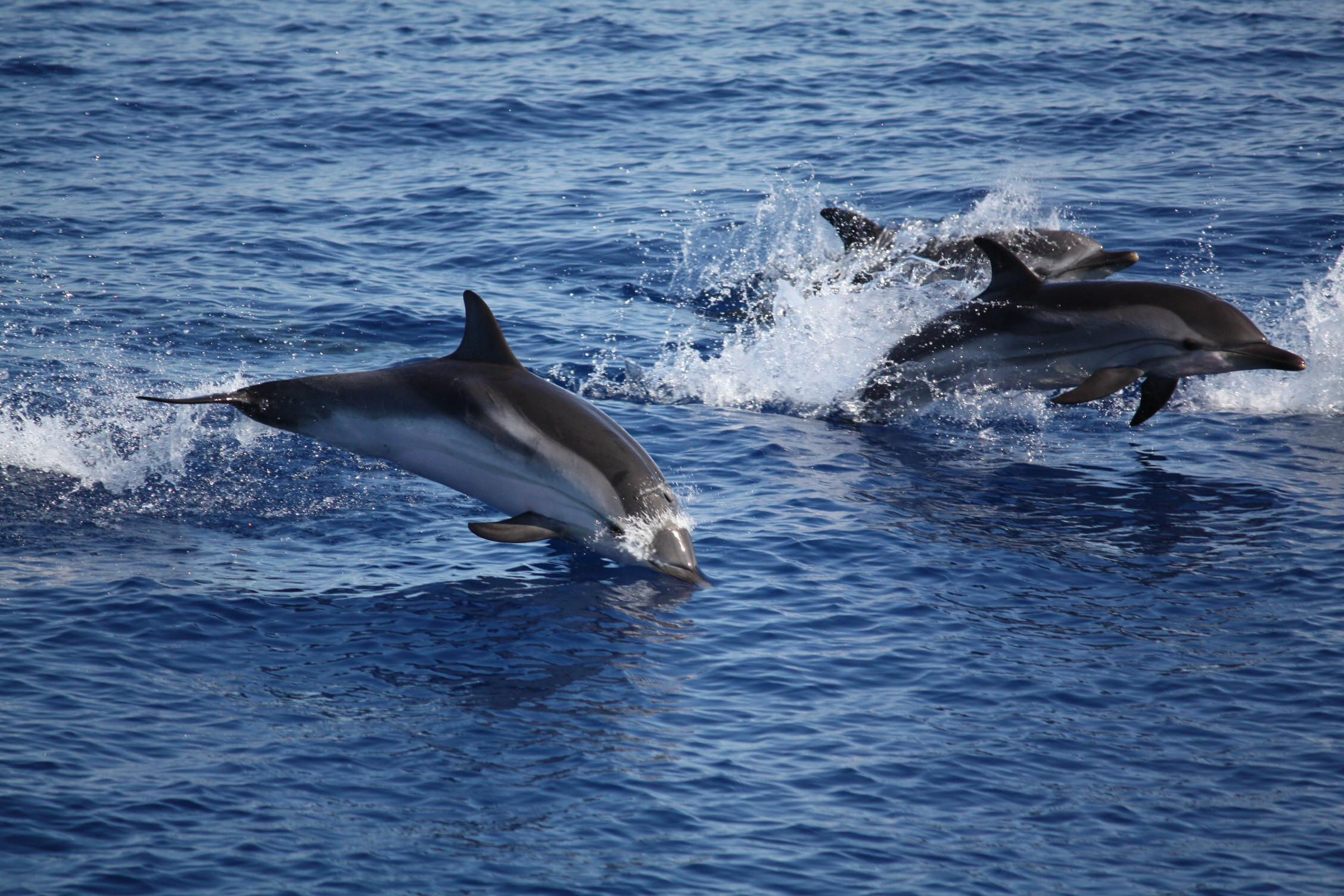

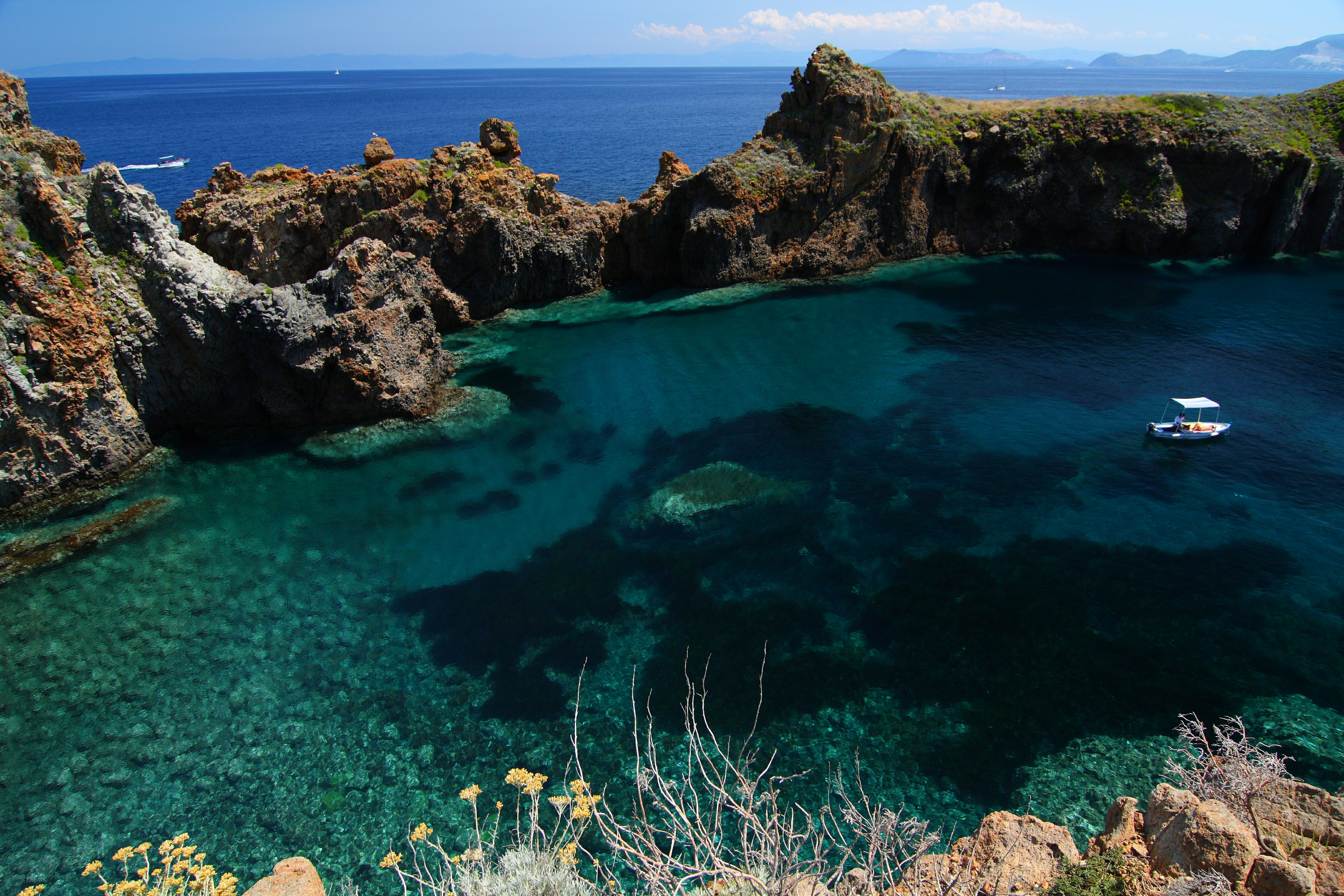

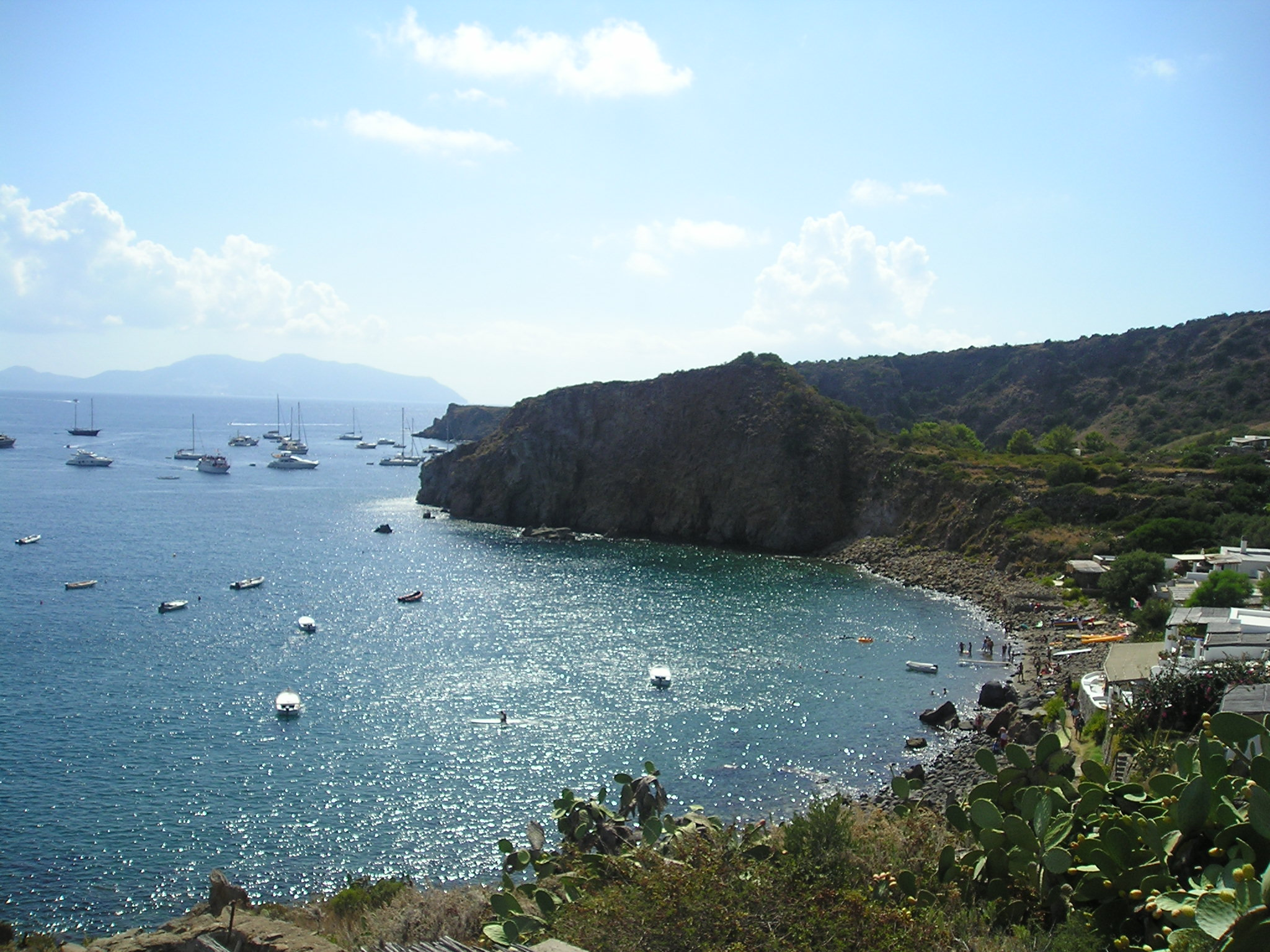

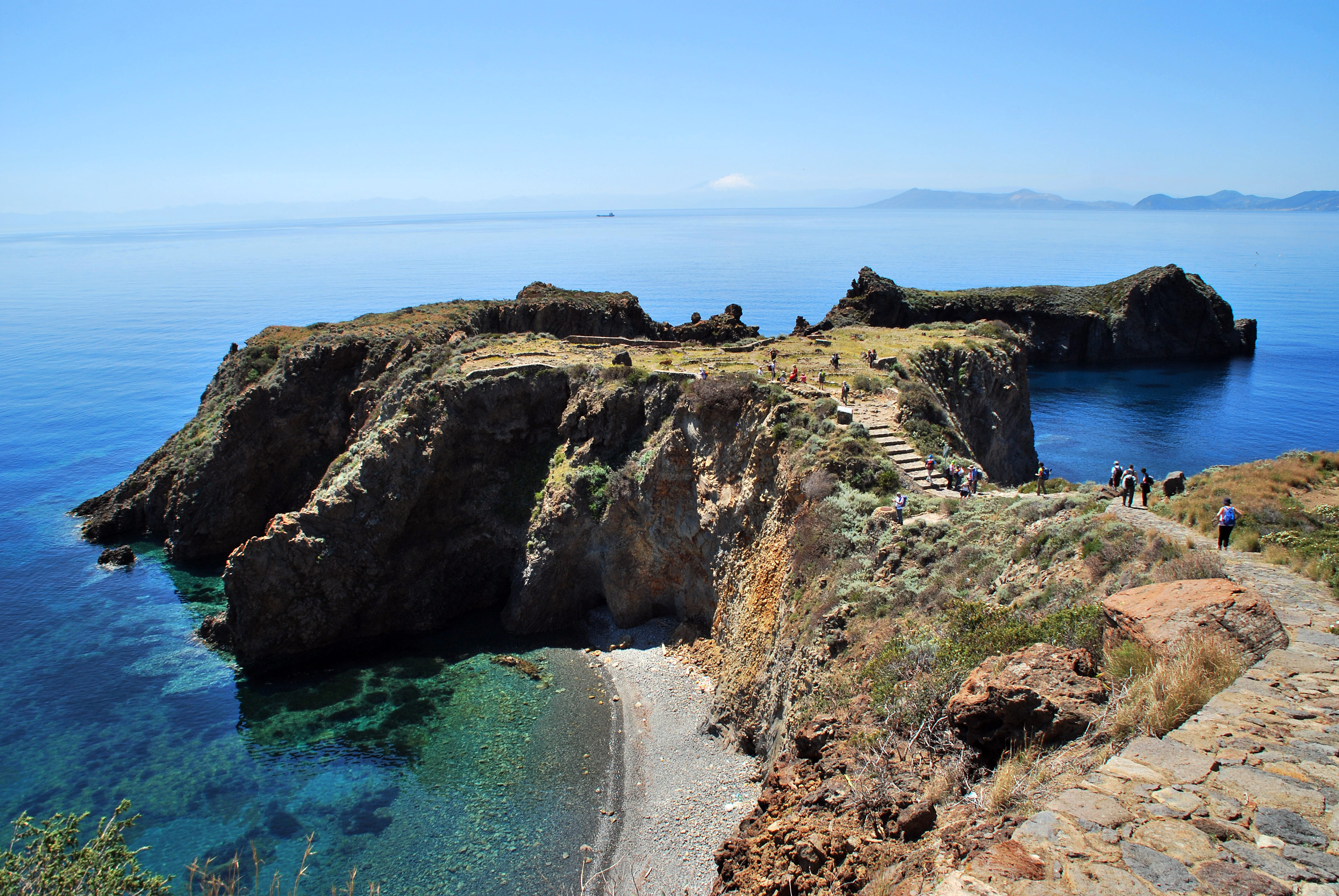

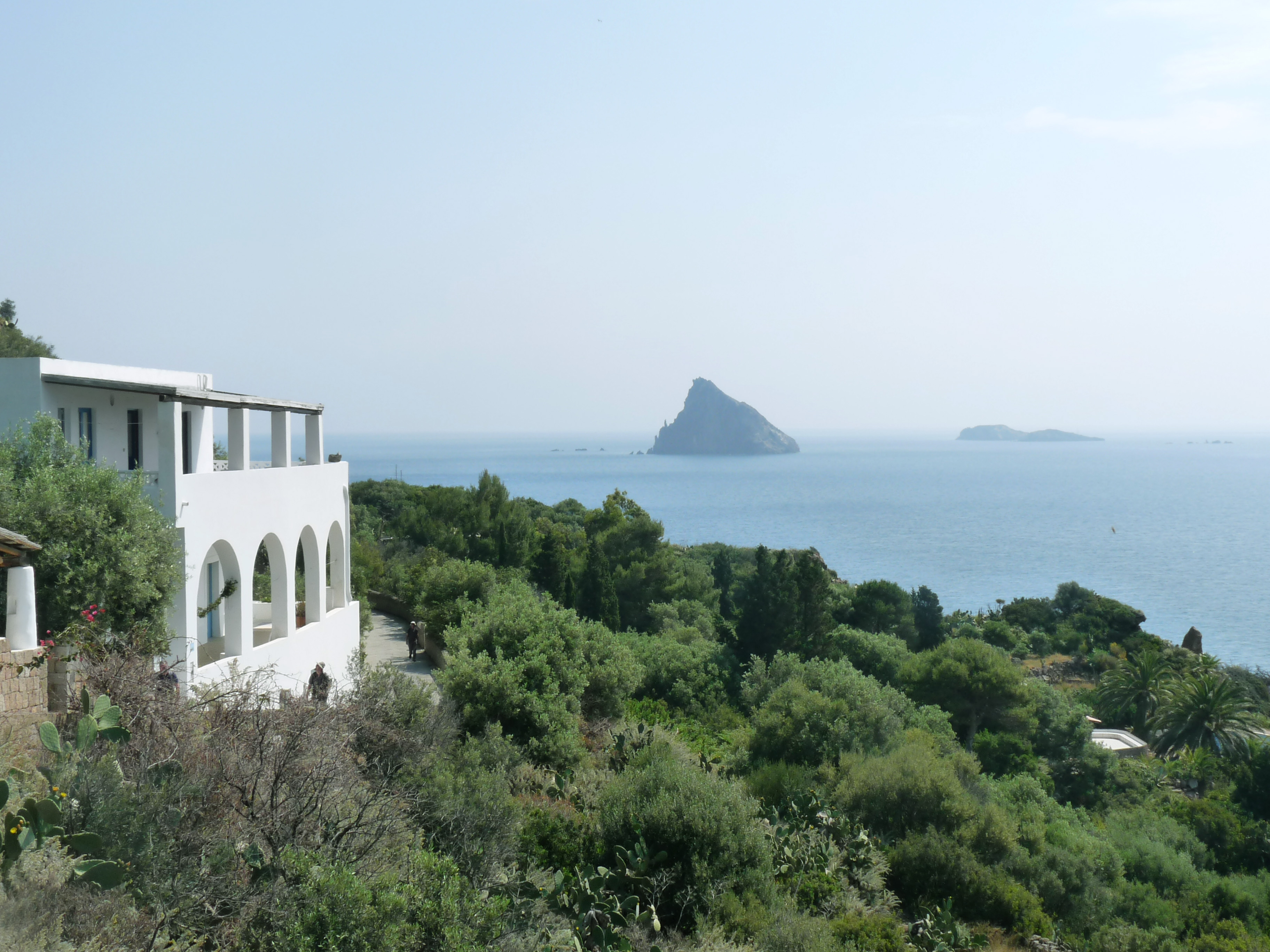

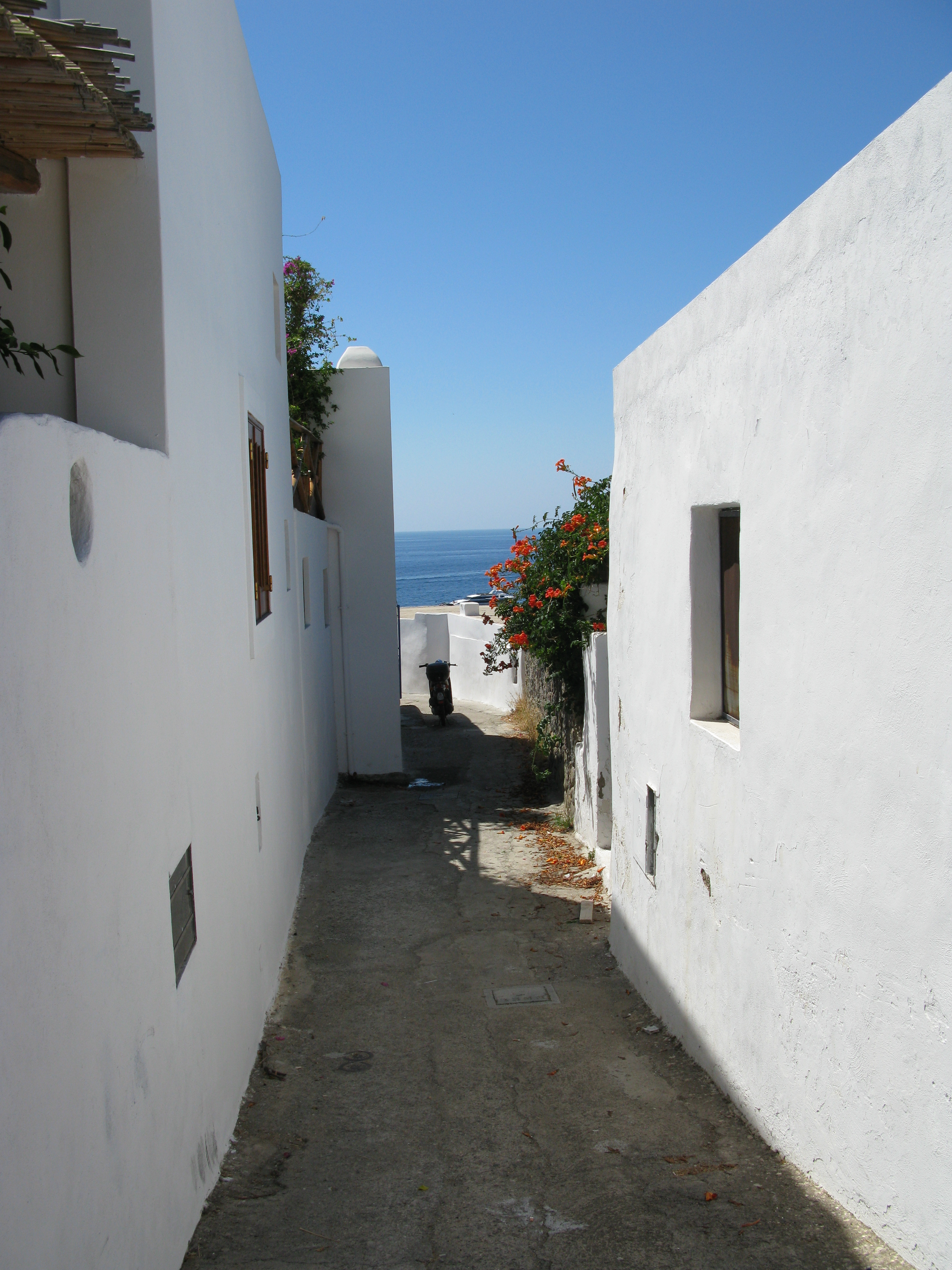

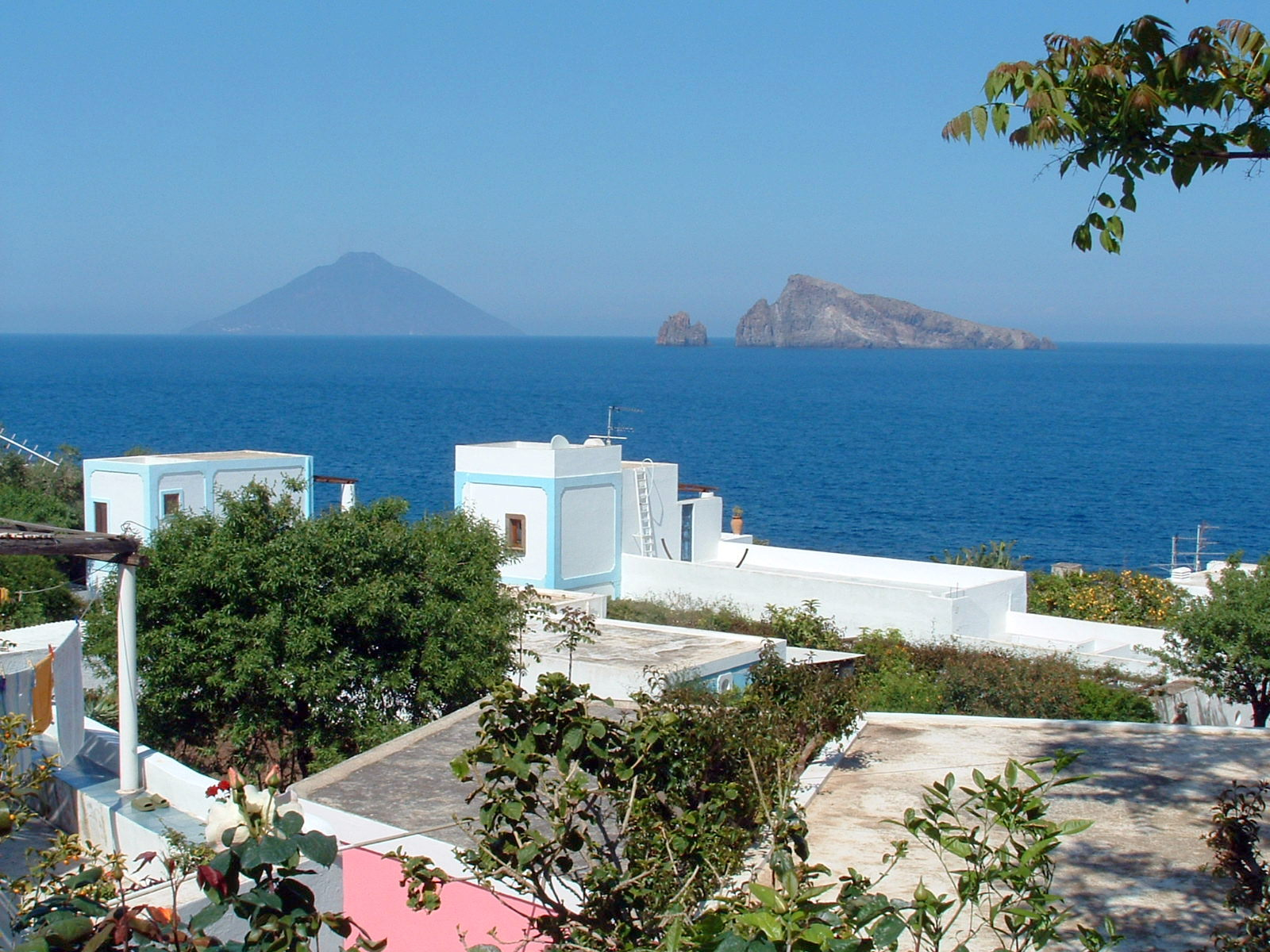

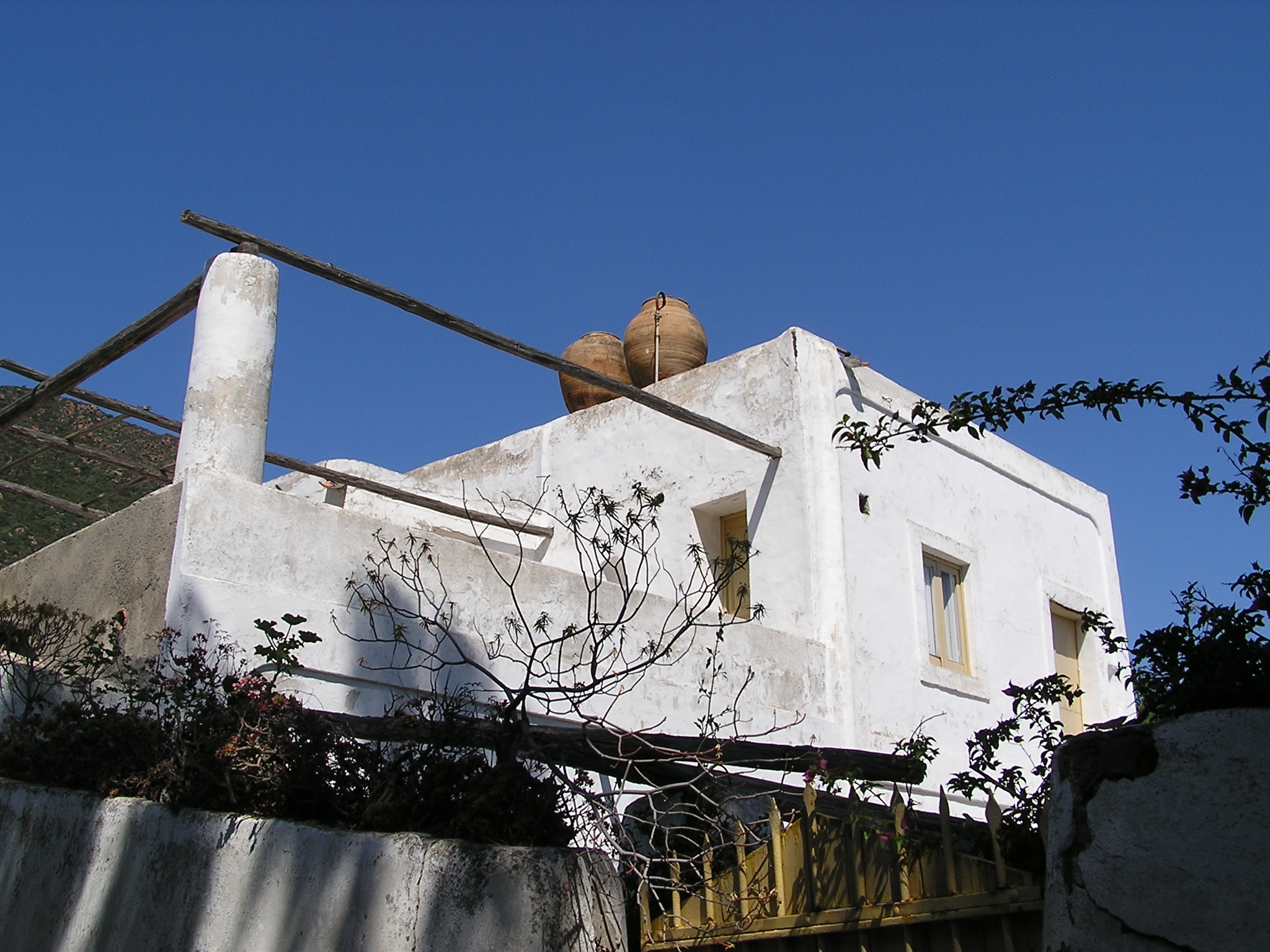

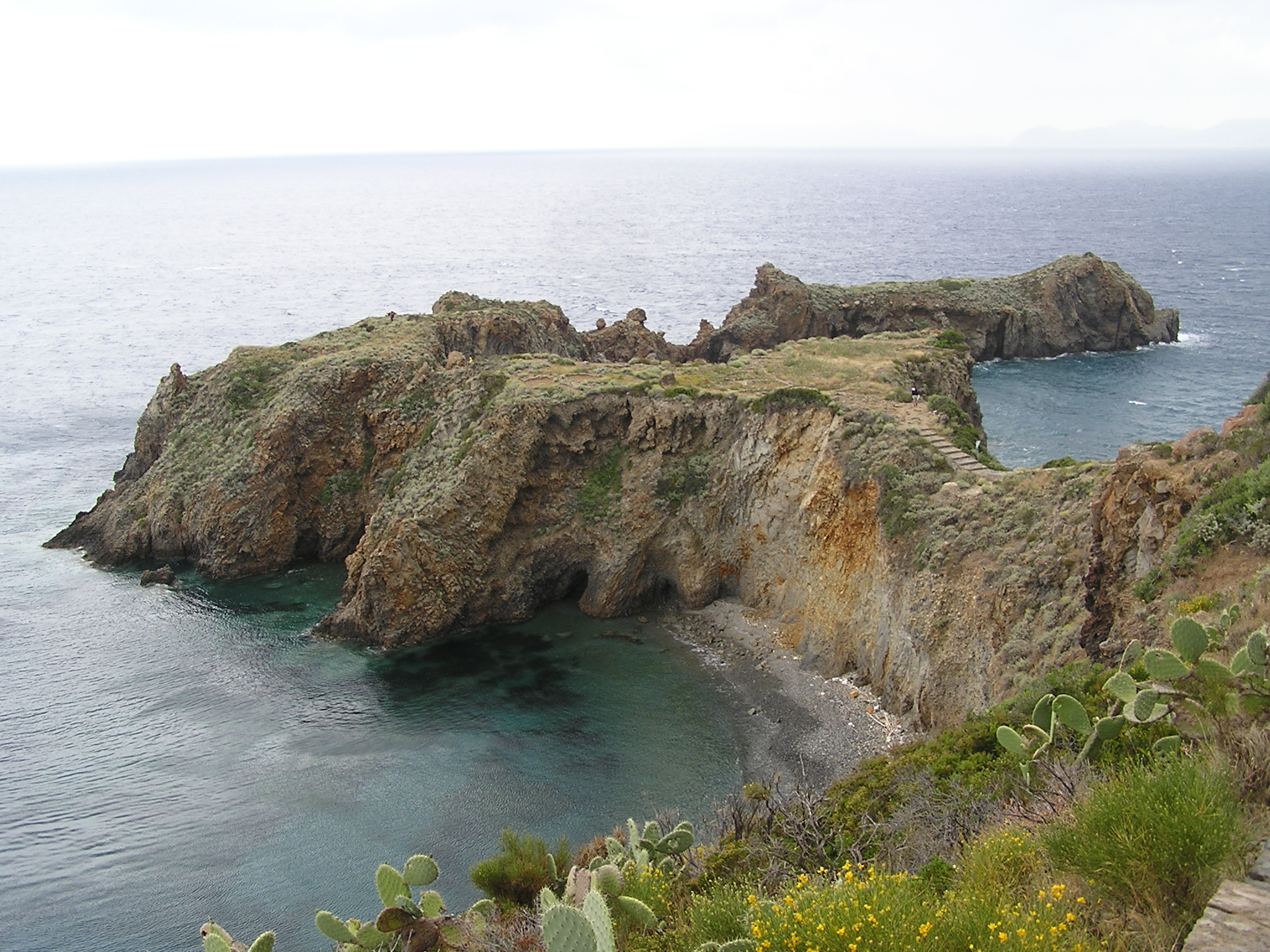

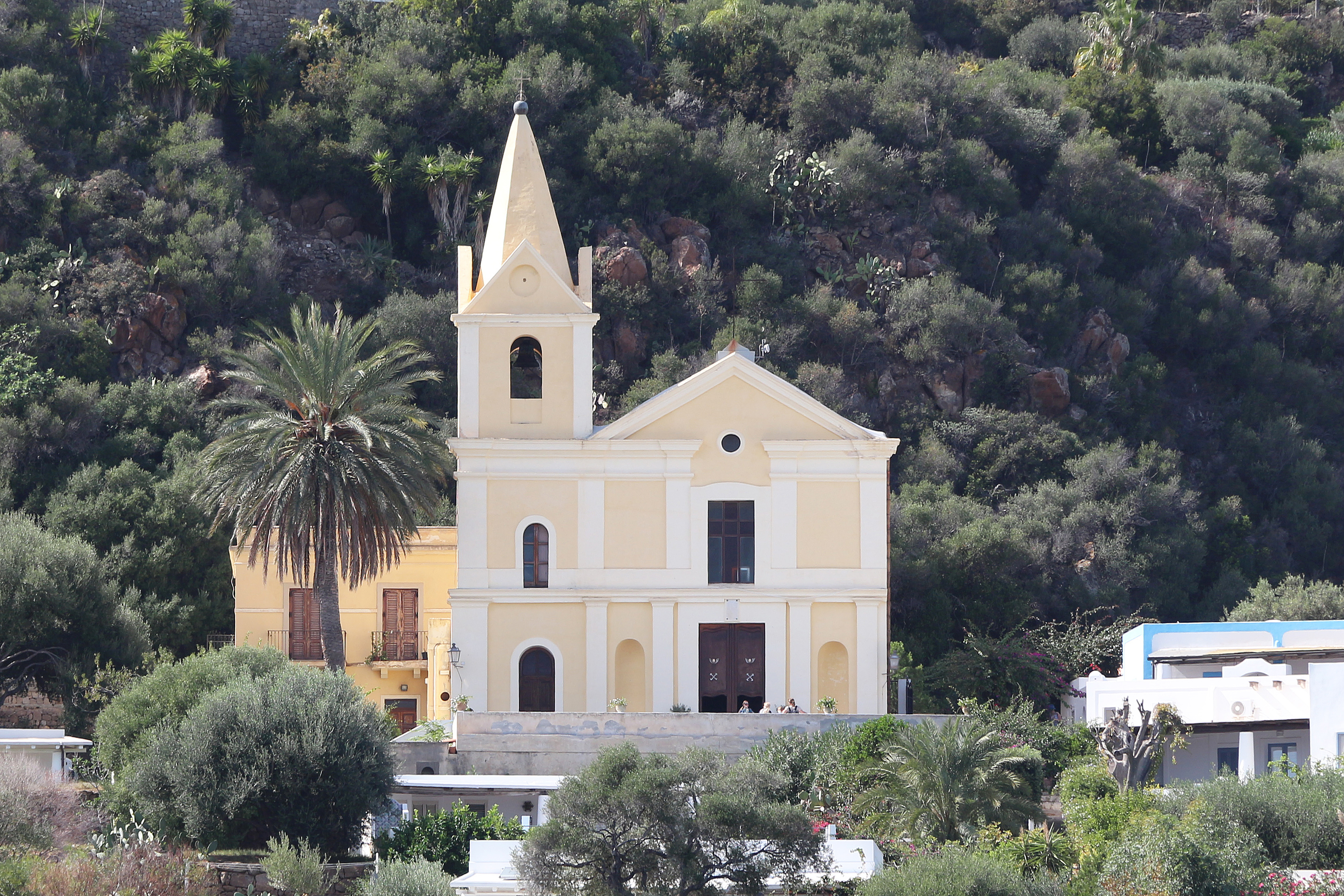

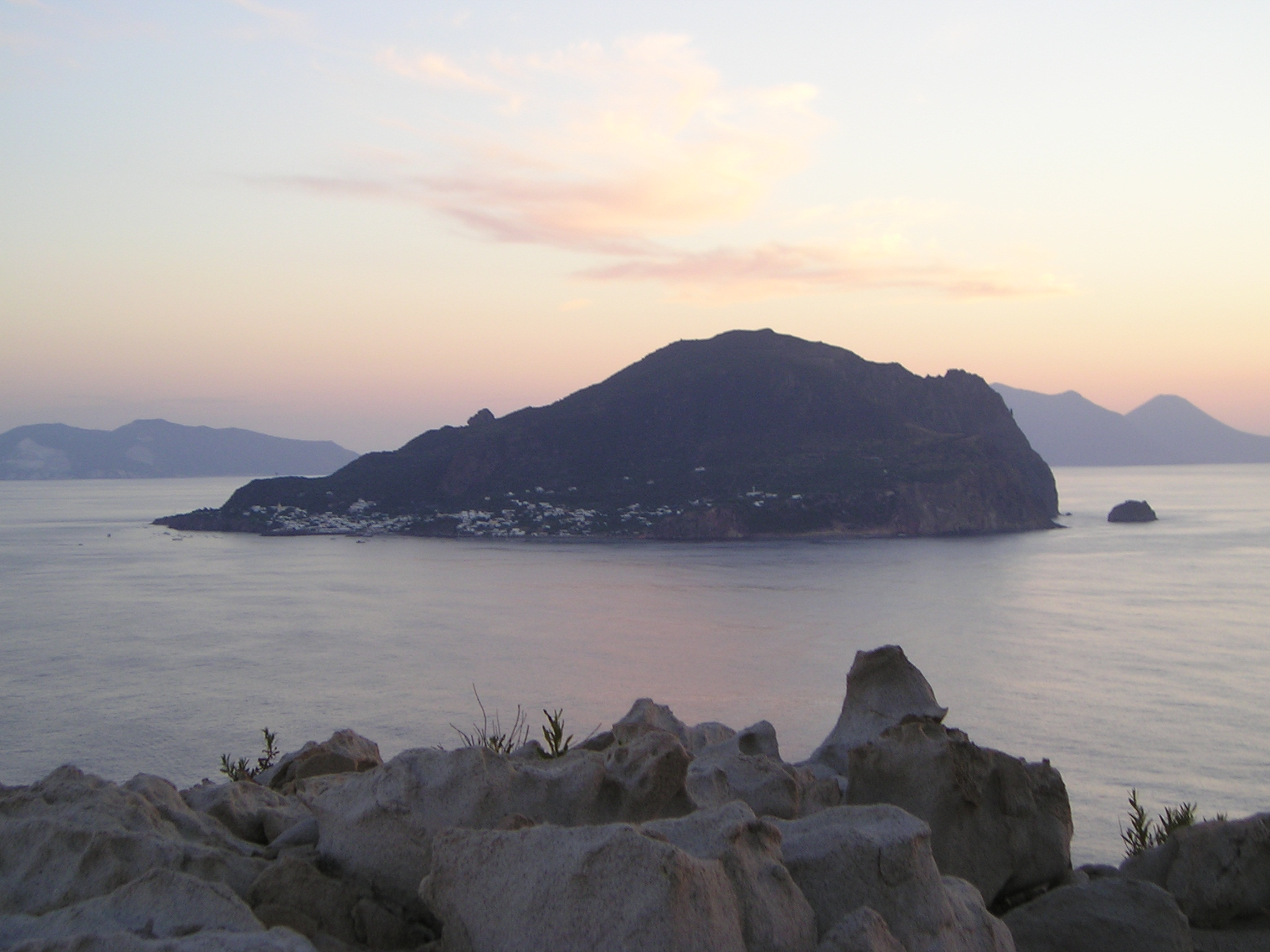

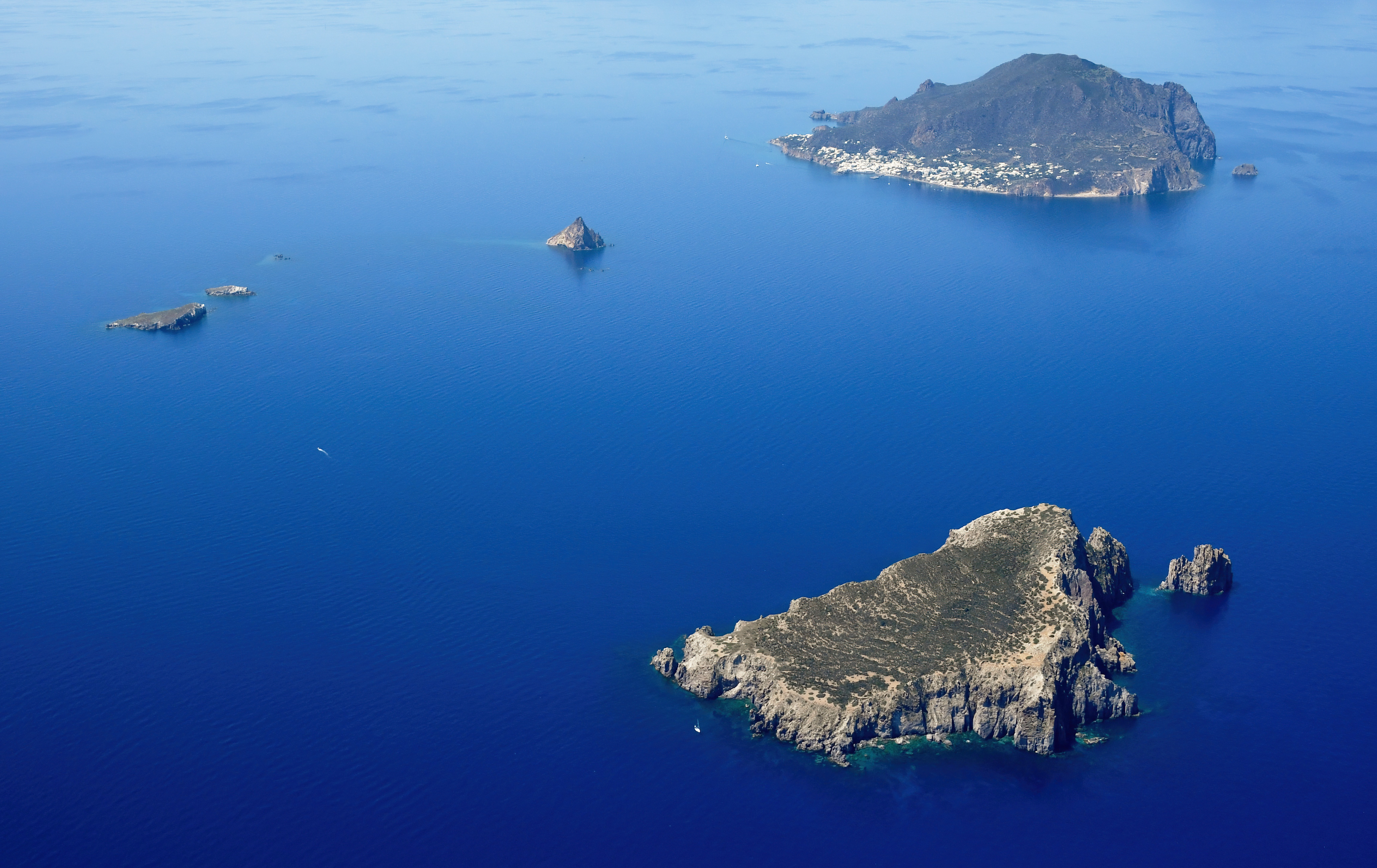

== See also ==
- List of volcanoes in Italy
- List of islands of Italy
