= Alicudi =

Alicudi Ερείκουσα/Ereíkousa (Greek)
- Island
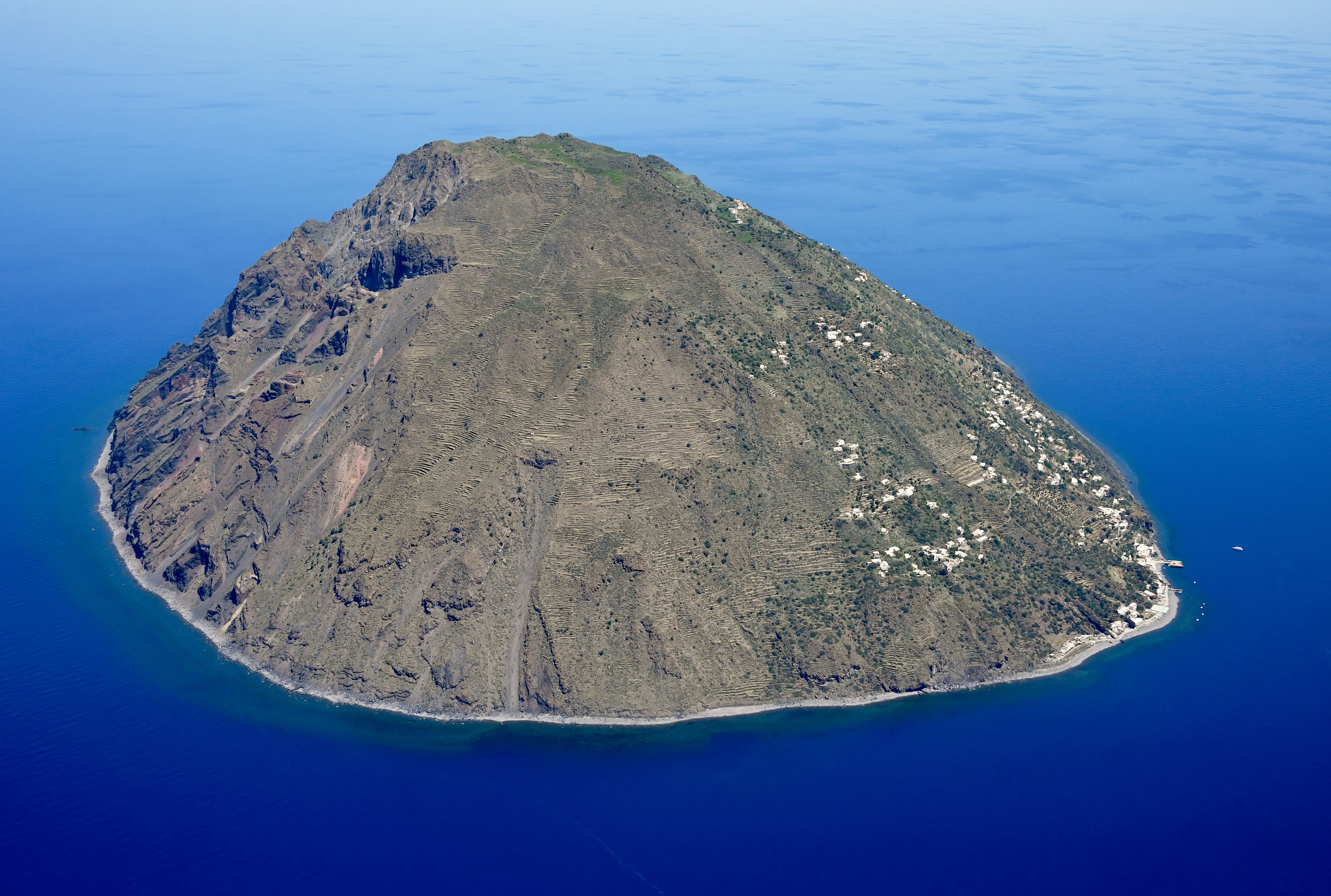
- Aerial view of Alicudi from the south

- Location in Italy Alicudi (Italy)
- Coordinates: 38°32′33″N 14°21′09″E
- Country: Italy
- Province: Messina
- Comune: Lipari

Area
  - Total: 5.2 km^{2} (2.0 sq mi)
- Highest elevation: 675 m (2,215 ft)

Population
  - Total: 120
  - Density: 23/km^{2} (60/sq mi)

Alicudi (Italian pronunciation: [aliˈkuːdi]) is the westernmost of the seven islands that make up the Aeolian archipelago, a volcanic island chain north of Sicily. The island is about 40 km (25 mi) west of Lipari, has a total area of 5.2 km^{2} (2.0 sq mi), and is roughly circular.

== History ==
The island was formed by the long-extinct Montagnola volcano, roughly 150,000 years ago. It has been suggested that the last evolutive act of the island took place only 27,000 years ago.

The island was first populated as long ago as 17th century BC, as some archaeological evidence from this period has been found. Roman ceramic fragments, dating from many centuries later, can be found on the eastern coast of the island.

The modern name of "Alicudi" is descended from the island's Ancient Greek name of Ἐρείκουσα Ereikousa, derived from Erica (heather) growing on the island’s slopes. For many centuries, Alicudi was the target of frequent incursions by pirates. Consequently, the island’s population was forced to find shelter in small houses constructed on high terraces and also meant that simple agriculture and cultivation of the peach were the foundations of the modest island economy.

In more recent times, the island became known for its alleged witches and sorcerers whose explanation has come to be attributed to ergotism in local grain-based foodstuff which, due to scarcity, was consumed regardless of the fungal infection.

In 1807, King Ferdinand IV created the title of Count of Alicudi in favor of the Spanish diplomat Alonso de Rivero.

== Demography ==
Today there are around 90 residents (all year round) who mostly live off fishing, or the small agriculture of the island. There is only one restaurant on the island and the menu depends greatly on what fish the local fishermen have caught, or what food supplies the hydrofoil brings. In summer the population grows to 200, especially during July and August.

== See also ==
- List of volcanoes in Italy

== Notes and references ==
- Giunta, Ezio (2005). "Alicudi". Estateolie 2005 - the Essential Guide: 98–99.
