= Arene Candide =

Cave and archaeological site in Italy

Arene Candide cave
- Caverna delle Arene Candide (Italian)
- Grotta dei Frati
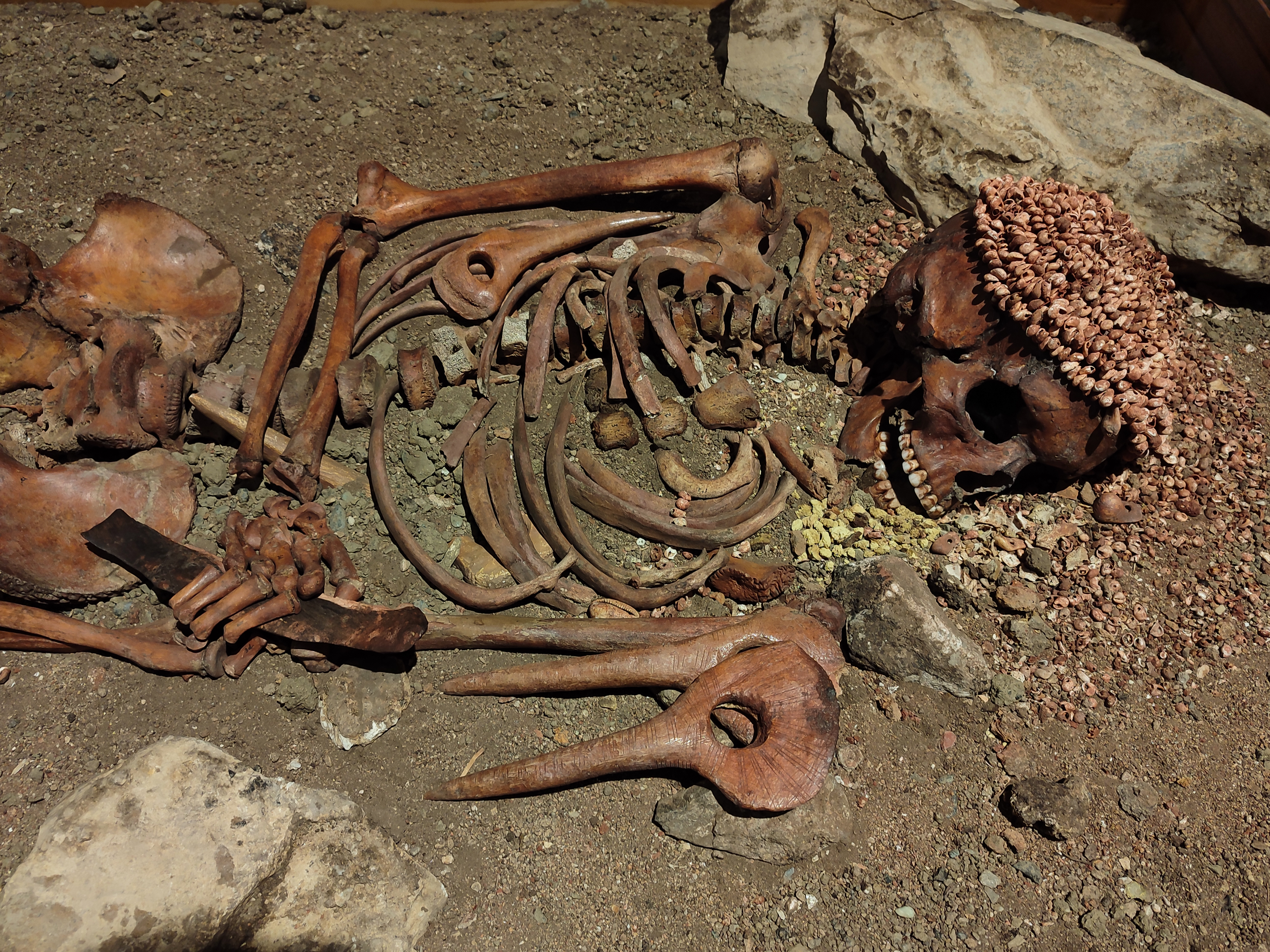
- The "Young prince" burial, now at Pegli archaeological museum

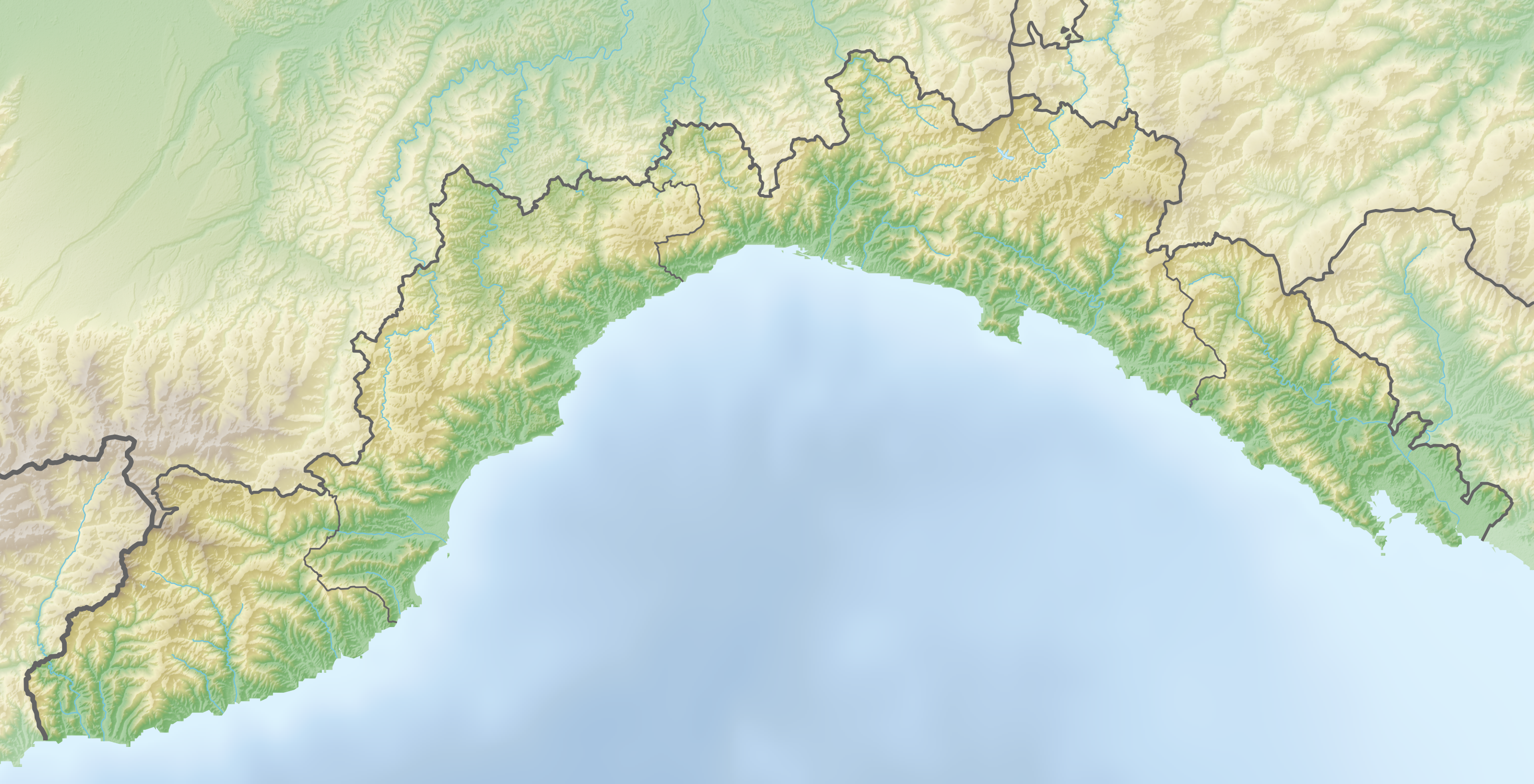
- location in Italy Arene Candide (Italy)
- 44°9′42.48″N 8°19′35″E
- Periods: late Upper Palaeolithic
- Associated with: prehistoric settlers
- Location: Caprazoppa promontory, Finale Ligure
- Region: Liguria, Italy

Site notes
- Archaeologists: Arturo Issel, Luigi Bernabò Brea, Luigi Cardini

The Arene Candide, (Italian: Caverna delle Arene Candide, lit. 'Cavern of the White Sands') is an archaeological site in Finale Ligure, Liguria, Italy. Its name was derived from the eponymous dune of white sand (arena candida) that could be found at the base of the cliff until the 1920s in the Caprazoppa promontory, where the Arene Candide cave is located.

The cave is situated at 90 m (300 ft) above sea level on the upper margin of the former Ghigliazza stone quarry and has three wide openings that point towards the sea. Thanks to its position and to those openings the cave is well lit and relatively dry. It can be accessed from above within 30 minutes via a path from Borgio Verezzi.

== History ==
The cave is locally known as Grotta dei Frati or Armassa, and received its popular name in 1864, when Arturo Issel visited it, who was the first in a long series of archaeologists and geologists and researchers.

The Arene Candide gained international attention after the excavation campaigns in the years 1940 to 1942 and 1948 to 1950 in the south-eastern part of the cave, led by Luigi Bernabò Brea and Luigi Cardini. Their excavation brought a detailed stratigraphic sequence to light, that ranges from the Upper Palaeolithic to the Byzantine period. The favorable environmental conditions in the cave proved to be the key to the good state of conservation of the organic material like bone fossils and charcoal fragments. Due to their extraordinary preservation condition, the nineteen paleolithic burial pits, that were discovered in Arene Candide rank among the most significant funerary complexes in the world, as the material enabled researchers to conduct extensive and comprehensive anthropological studies in the framework of contemporary available scientific methods. Further excavations were carried out in the 1970s and the 2000s.

The most remarkable and scientifically valuable burial is called the "Young prince" (Giovane principe), a male around 15 years old, dated to about 23,500 years BP, attributed to the Gravettian culture. The body was positioned lying on its back on a layer of red ochre, 6.7 m (22 ft) below the surface sediment, looking to the south and accompanied by an extremely rich set of grave goods including a cap made of shells and deer canines, jewels made of shellfish, mammoth ivory pendants, four deer antler batons, and a 23 centimetres (9.1 in) stone blade in his right hand. The blade was crafted from flint originating in the Forcalquier basin in south-eastern France. The making of such intricate grave goods, specifically the inclusion of mammoth ivory beads would have been a huge investment for a hunter-gatherer society that the individual would have belonged to, both in regards to resources and time to craft. He died from a serious injury to the jaw and shoulder, possibly inflicted by a bear or big cat. This area was covered with yellow ochre before the final burial. Isotope analysis of the teeth revealed that approximately 25% of the juvenile's diet consisted of marine protein.

Excavation discoveries are on display in several Italian museums, including the Museum of Ligurian Archaeology in Genoa Pegli, the Archaeological Museum of Finale in Finale Ligure and the Pigorini National Museum of Prehistory and Ethnography in Rome.

== Archeological Findings and Analysis ==
The cave underwent early excavations in the late eighteenth and early nineteenth centuries, but did not undergo systematic excavation until the 1940s with Luigi Bernabò Brea and Luigi Cardini, but has been excavated and archeologically analyzed many times since. With these excavations, it became understood that the site was significant for its unique Paleolithic and Neolithic layers.

The cave is believed to have held funerary significance for the Late Epigravettian culture, with up to around twenty individuals being found. Besides the significance of the Young Prince, the cave also is significant for understanding many prehistoric cultural and funerary practices from prehistoric European cultures. In 2009–2011, Cambridge led an analysis of broken pebbles found in excavations that carried trace amounts of red ochre, which they believe to have been used to apply the red ochre in late Epigravettian funerary rituals, part of which included the “killing” or destruction of the pebbles. There is also evidence among some of the individuals buried in the cave of a practice of skull modification during the Late Paleolithic. Among the richness of grave goods, bird wings and beaks also seemed to have been an important part of the funerary rites.

Those that used the cave for funerary practices also seem to have exhumed and reinterred their dead to make room for new burials, which has made excavations and analysis somewhat complicated when bones were disarticulated and rearranged by those using the cave for new burials.
