= Liparus (mythology) =

Mythological Greek character

In Greek mythology, Liparus (Ancient Greek Λίπαρος Líparos) is an Ausonian king and founder of the city of Lipari on the island of the same name.

According to Diodorus Siculus, he was the son of Auson. Driven out of Italy by his brothers, he fled to the island of Lipari, and founded the city of Lipari, named after him. Later, Aiolos, the son of Hippotes, settled on the island and married Liparus' daughter Cyane.

As Liparus longed to return to the Italian mainland, Aiolos helped his father-in-law to obtain territories in the area around Sorrento, over which Liparus became king, while Aiolos took over the rule of Lipari. Long after his death, Liparus is said to have been worshipped in Sorrento like a hero.
