= Lipari =

Lipari Lìpari (Sicilian)
- Comune
- Comune di Lipari
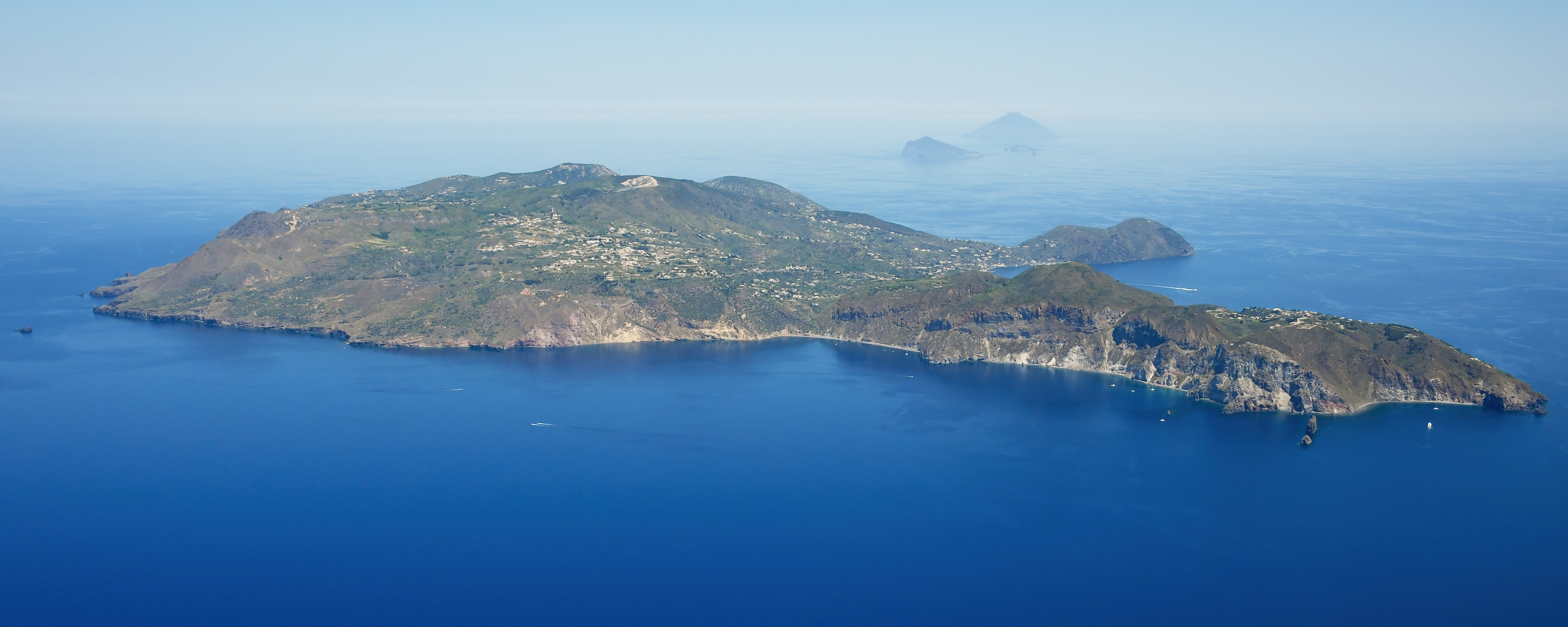
- View of the island of Lipari

- Coat of arms

- Location within Italy Location within Sicily
- Coordinates: 38°28′N 14°57′E
- Country: Italy
- Region: Sicily
- Metropolitan city: Messina (ME)
- Frazioni: Alicudi, Filicudi, Panarea, Stromboli, Vulcano, Canneto, Acquacalda, Quattropani, Pianoconte, Lami

Area
  - Total: 89.72 km^{2} (34.64 sq mi)

Population (2026)
  - Total: 12,794
  - Density: 142.6/km^{2} (369.3/sq mi)
- Demonym: Liparesi or Liparoti
- Time zone: UTC+1 (CET)
  - Summer (DST): UTC+2 (CEST)
- Patron saint: Saint Bartholomew
- Saint day: 24 August

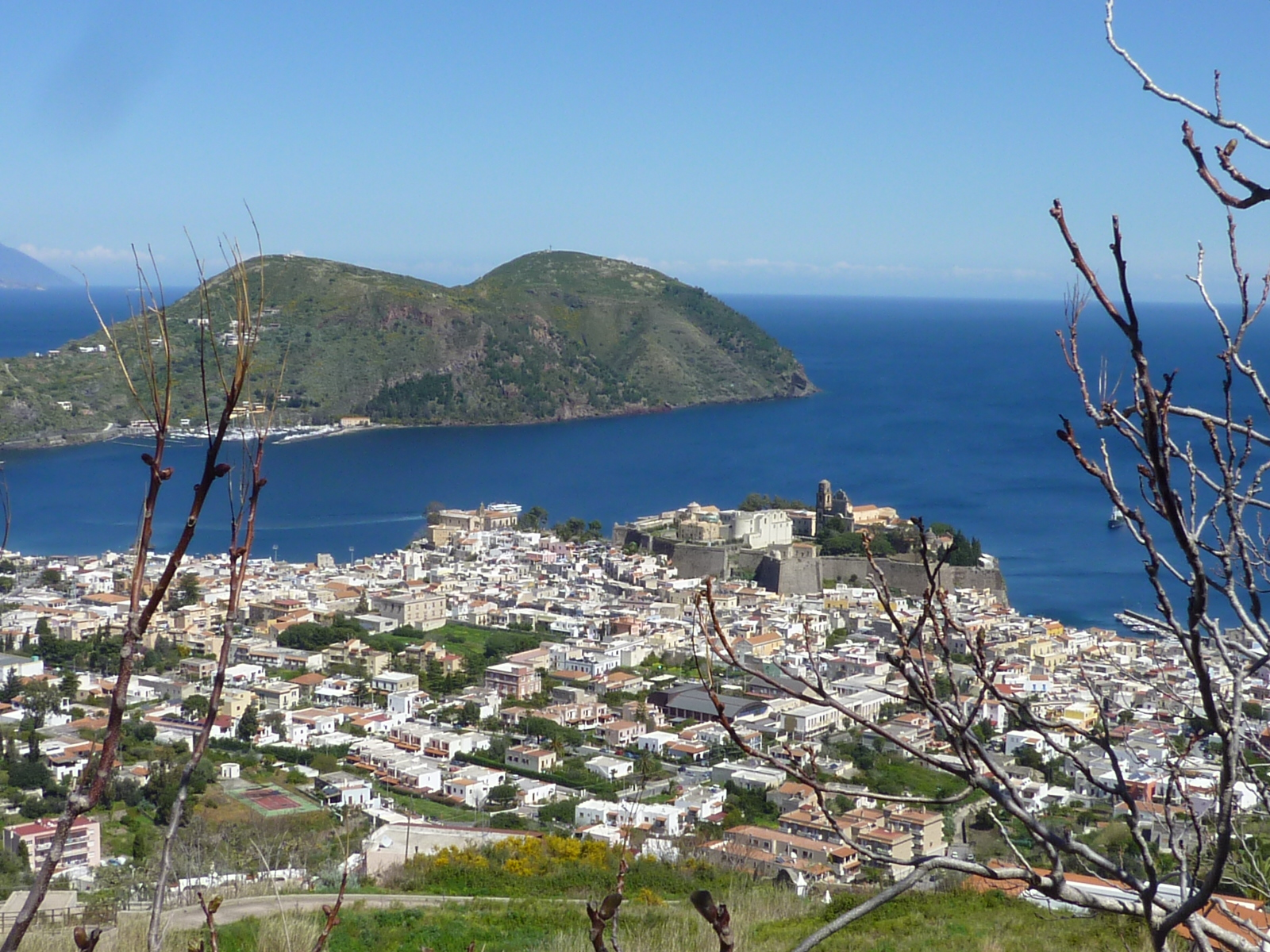
View of the town of Lipari

Lipari (/ˈlɪpəri/ LIP-ər-ee, Italian: [ˈliːpari]; Sicilian: Lìpari; Latin: Lipara or Meligūnis; Ancient Greek: Μελιγουνίς, romanized: Meligounís, or Λιπάρα, Lipára) is the largest of the seven Aeolian Islands, located in the Tyrrhenian Sea off the northern coast of the Sicily in southern Italy, and a comune (municipality) including six of them (Lipari, Vulcano, Panarea, Stromboli, Filicudi and Alicudi); it is administratively part of Metropolitan City of Messina. It has 12,794 permanent residents, but during the May to September tourist season, the total population may reach up to 20,000. It is also the name of the biggest island in the archipelago, where the main urban area of the municipality is located.

== History ==
=== Neolithic period ===
In Neolithic times Lipari was, much like Sardinia, one of the few centres of trading in obsidian, a hard black volcanic glass prized by Neolithic peoples for the extremely sharp cutting edges that can be obtained. Lipari's history is rich in incidents as witnessed by the recent retrievals of several necropoli and other archaeological sites. Humans seem to have inhabited the island already in 5000 BC, though a local legend gives the eponymous name Liparus to the leader of a people coming from Campania.

=== Bronze Age ===
==== Early Bronze Age ====
In the early Bronze Age, at the end of the third millennium BC, new settlers of Aeolian origin came from Mycenaean Greece, giving their name to the islands. They had already settled in Metapontum in Italy and used the islands as outposts for controlling trading routes through the strait of Messina.

==== Middle Bronze Age ====
Successive domestic buildings have been excavated on the acropolis dating from the 18th c. BC and underlying the ancient Roman town.

==== Late Bronze Age ====
In the 13th century BC, the islands were settled by Ausinian peoples from the coasts of Campania, who introduced the myth of King Liparus from whom the town's name derives.

In the Mycenaean Period, Lipari has yielded pottery from LHI to LHIII.

=== Iron Age ===
Lipari's continuous occupation may have been interrupted violently when in the late 9th century BC an Ausonian civilization site was burned and apparently not rebuilt. Many household objects have been retrieved from the charred site.

=== Greek and Roman periods ===
Greek colonists from Knidos arrived at Lipara ~580 BC after their first colonization attempt in Sicily failed and their leader, Pentathlos, was killed. They settled on the site of the village now known as Castello in Magna Graecia. The colony successfully fought the Etruscans for control of the Tyrrhenian Sea.

The town was initially concentrated upon the summit of the rock which played the role of acropolis, seat of religious cults and of public life, but in the course of the first century of its existence, an increase in the population necessitated an expansion into the area at the foot of the rocky slopes and on to the top of the Civita hill. A first city wall, built sometime in the 5th century BC was erected along outcrops at the bottom of the slopes of the rock, leaving outside the modern district of Diana, which was destined from the beginning to accommodate the city necropolis. A second city wall was built in the 4th century BC to enclose the new residential area bounded to the north and south by the river-beds of Santa Lucia and Ponte, which in ancient times ran into the two bays at the foot of the rock. The city wall ran near the two river-beds and then joined on to the Acropolis and the Civita hill. The mighty fortification, of which some traces are visible today in the district of Diana, divided the town from the necropolis.

Carthaginian forces succeeded in holding the site briefly during their struggles with Dionysios I, tyrant of Syracuse in 394 BC, but once they were gone the polis entered a three-way alliance which included Dionysios' new colony at Tyndaris. Lipara prospered, but in 304 BC Agathokles took the town by treachery and is said to have lost all of his pillage from it in a storm at sea.

Lipara became a Carthaginian naval base during the first Punic War, but fell to Roman forces in 252–251 BC. It was occupied by Agrippa in Octavian's campaign against Sextus Pompeius. Under the Roman Empire it was a place of retreat and exile and was enjoyed because of its thermal baths using natural springs. The Emperor Caracalla sent his wife, Fulvia Plautilla, and her brother, Plautius, into exile here for the rest of their lives.

Many objects recovered from old wrecks are now in the Aeolian Museum of Lipari.

=== From the Middle Ages to present ===
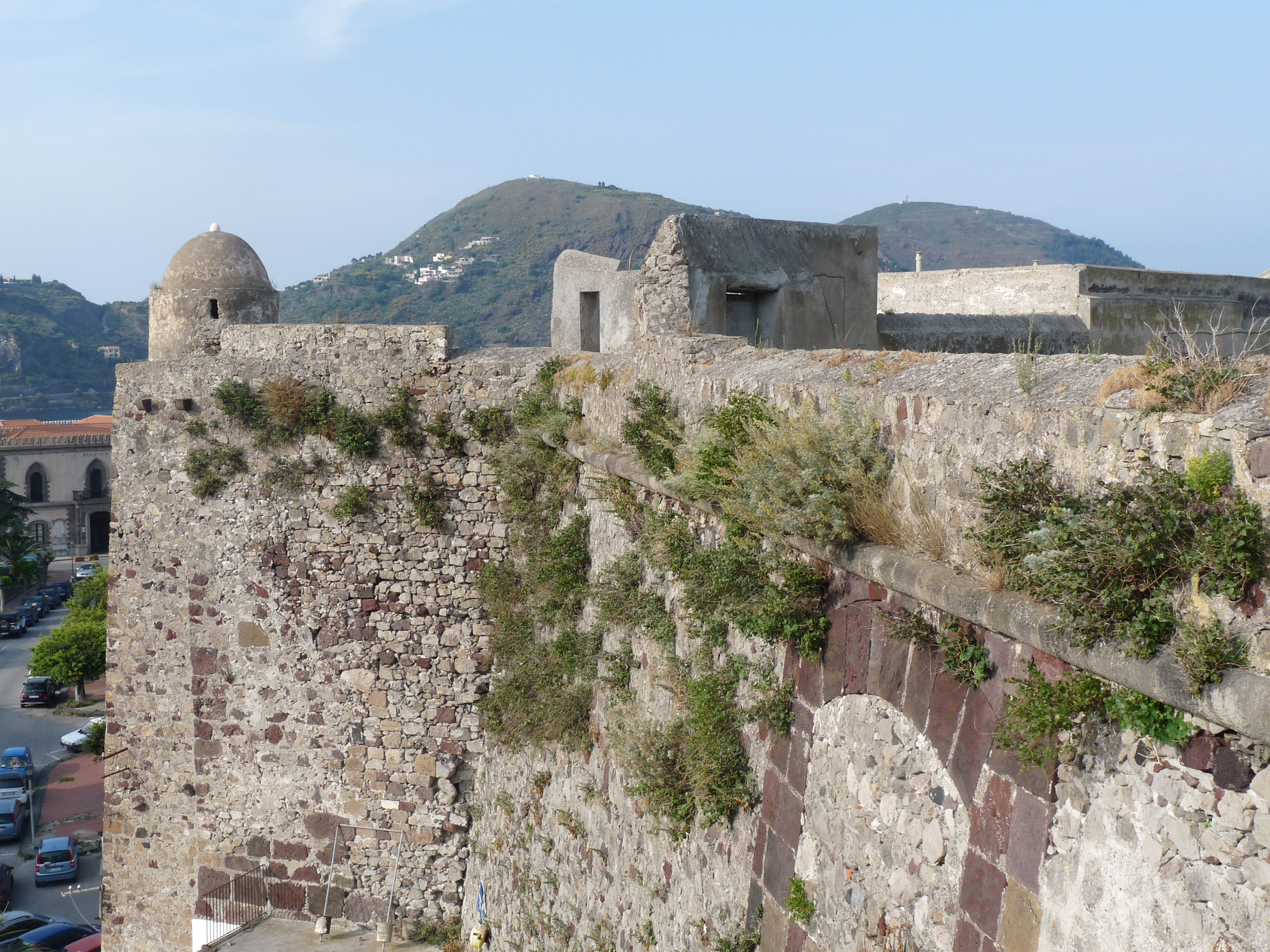
The 1556 fortifications, built atop ancient Greek walls.

Lipari was probably an episcopal see from the 3rd century onward, with the first bishop being St. Agatone, who, according to tradition, had found the sacred remains in his cathedral. The presence of the relics has been attested since at least 546.

In the 9th century, Sicily was conquered by the Arabs, and soon Saracen pirates began to raid across the Tyrrhenian Sea, with dramatic effects for Lipari. In 839 the Saracens slaughtered much of the population, the relics of St. Bartholomew were moved to Benevento, and Lipari was eventually almost totally abandoned. The Normans conquered the Arabs throughout Sicily between 1060 and 1090, and repopulated the island once their rule was secure. The Lipari episcopal seat was reinstated in 1131.

Though still plagued by pirate raids, the island was continually populated from this time onward. Rule of the island was passed from the Normans to the Hohenstaufen Kings, followed by the Angevins, and then the Aragonese, until Carlos I, the Aragonese King, became the Spanish King, and was then quickly crowned Holy Roman Emperor Charles V.

==== Franco-Ottoman attack ====
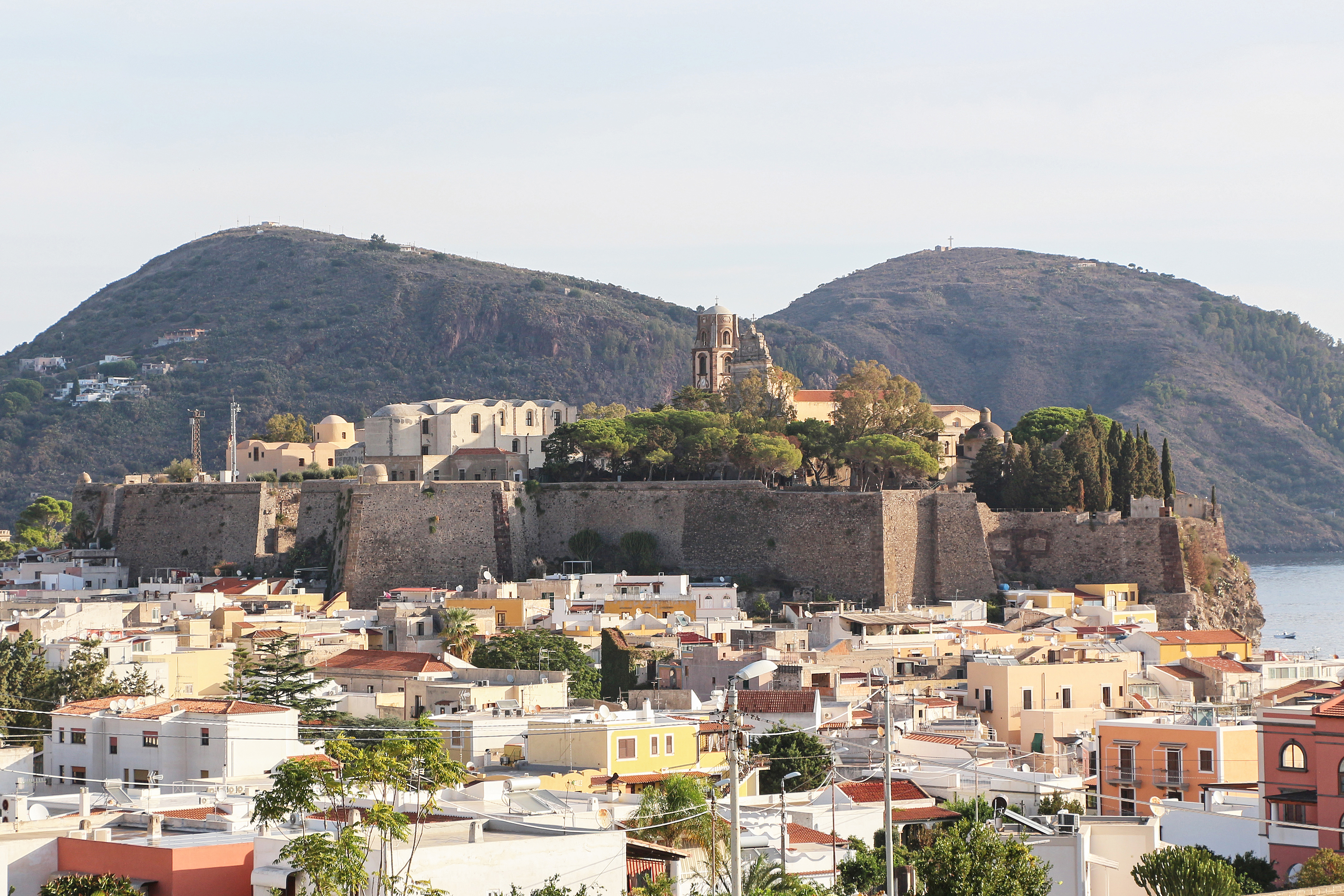
View of the 16th century Lipari castle on the old Greek acropolis

In 1544, Ottoman admiral Hayreddin Barbarossa ransacked Lipari and enslaved the entire population. Five French galleys under Captain Polin, including the superb Réale, accompanied Barbarossa's fleet on a diplomatic mission to Sultan Suleiman in execution of the Franco-Ottoman alliance. French priest Jérôme Maurand lamented about the depredation to his Christian fellow men during the campaign at Lipari: "To see so many poor Christians, and especially so many little boys and girls [enslaved] caused a very great pity." He also mentioned "the tears, wailings and cries of these poor Lipariotes, the father regarding his son and the mother her daughter... weeping while leaving their own city in order to be brought into slavery by those dogs who seemed like rapacious wolves amidst timid lambs".

A number of the citizens were ransomed in Messina and eventually returned to the islands.

Charles V then had his Spanish subjects repopulate the island and build the massive city walls atop the walls of the ancient Greek acropolis in 1556.

The walls created a mighty fortress still standing today. The acropolis, high above the main town, was a safe haven for the populace in the event of a raid. While these walls protected the main town, it was not safe to live on the rest of the island until Mediterranean piracy was largely eradicated, which did not occur until the 19th century.

=== 20th century ===
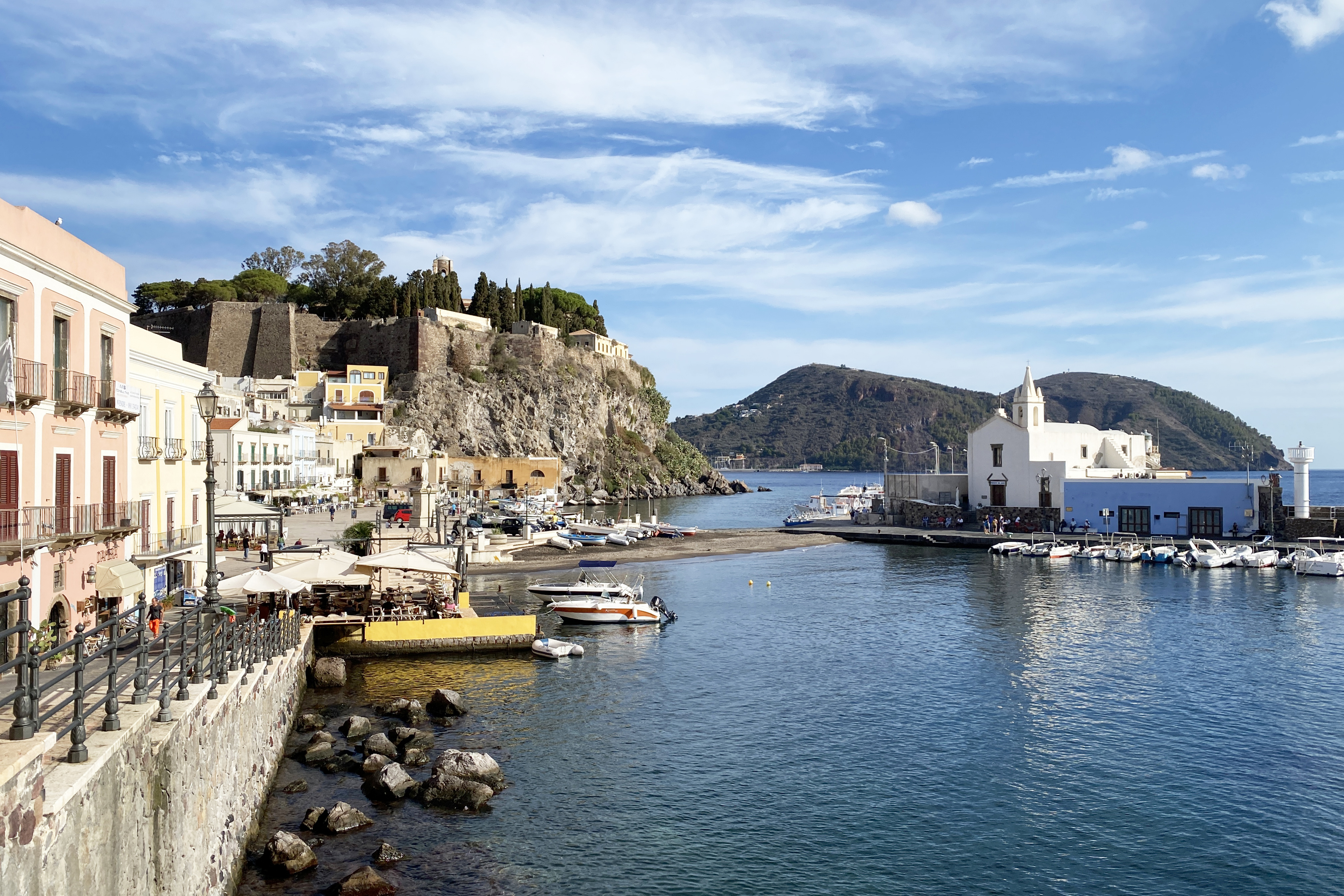
Marina Corta, the smaller harbour in the main town

From the 1920s to the 1940s, the Lipari islands were used for the confinement of political prisoners, including Emilio Lussu, Curzio Malaparte, Carlo Rosselli, Giuseppe Ghetti, and Edda Mussolini. During the 1930s, the islands were used to detain exiled members of the fascist, Croatian nationalist Ustaše movement.

The islands were then extensively searched by archeologists Madeleine Cavalier and Luigi Bernabò Brea after World War II.

On 25 July 2013, the mayor of Lipari issued an ordinance banning the wearing of "bikinis, thongs or other swimming costumes in the town centre" to be punished with a fine of 500 euros (equivalent to about $700 in 2014).

== Geography ==
Lipari Island is the largest of a chain of islands in a volcanic archipelago situated in between Vesuvius and Etna. The island has a surface area of 89.72 square kilometres (34.64 sq mi) and is 30 kilometres (19 mi) from Sicily. Besides the main town, most of the year-round population resides in one of the four main villages: Pianoconte is almost due west across the island, Quattropani in the northwest, Acquacalda along the northern coast, whereas Canneto is on the eastern shore north of Lipari town. The highest point on the island is Monte Chirica at 602 metres (1,975 ft).

== Demographics ==
As of 2026, the population is 12,794, of which 51.1% are male, and 48.9% are female. Minors make up 14.1% of the population, and seniors make up 23.9%.

Historical population

Year	Pop.	±%
1861	14,968	—
1871	12,463	−16.7%
1881	12,265	−1.6%
1901	15,451	+26.0%
1911	16,310	+5.6%
1921	15,280	−6.3%
1931	14,276	−6.6%
1936	14,156	−0.8%

Year	Pop.	±%
1951	11,799	−16.7%
1961	11,037	−6.5%
1971	10,037	−9.1%
1981	10,547	+5.1%
1991	10,382	−1.6%
2001	10,554	+1.7%
2011	11,642	+10.3%
2021	12,508	+7.4%

Source: ISTAT

=== Immigration ===
As of 2025, immigrants make up 11.0% of the population. The 5 largest foreign countries of birth are Romania, Morocco, Sri Lanka, Germany, and Tunisia.

== Culture ==
Lipari's large archaeological museum extensively covers history of the Aeolian Islands from prehistoric to classical times, vulcanology, marine history, and the paleontology of the western Mediterranean.

Ancient Greek geographer Strabo identified Lipari with Aeolia, the island of the winds in Homer's Odyssey. It is here that Aeolus, the god of winds dwelt.

It is on Lipari that Virgil places the den of Cyclopes:

"...Liparen, fumantibus ardua saxis

Quam subter specus et cyclopum exesa caminis

Antra Ætnœa tonant..."

The annual Feasts of Saint Bartholomew is kept on the day of his arrival in 580. The remains of the Apostle were transported to the island of Lipari.

== Geology ==
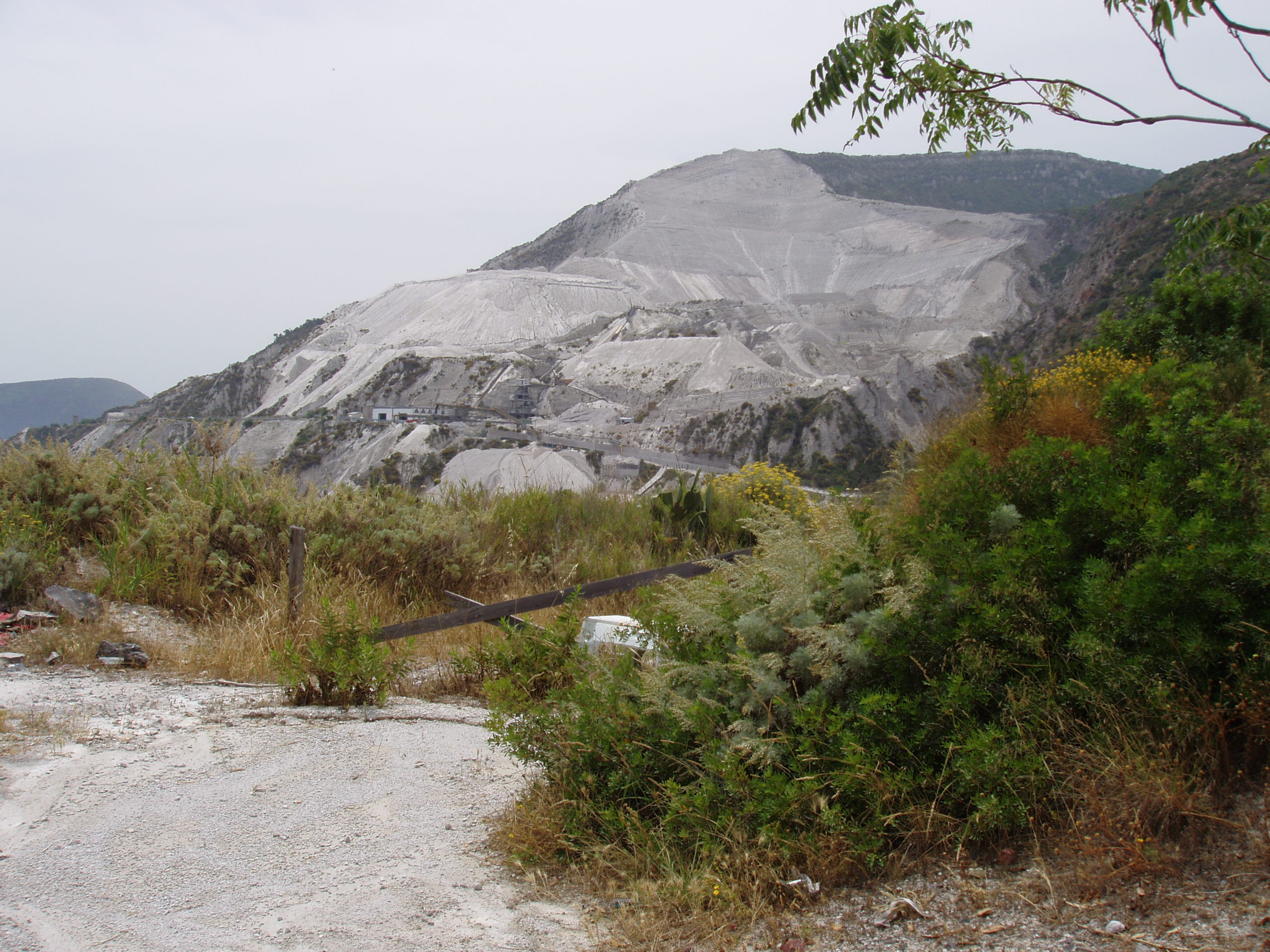
A pumice mine just east of Acquacalda.

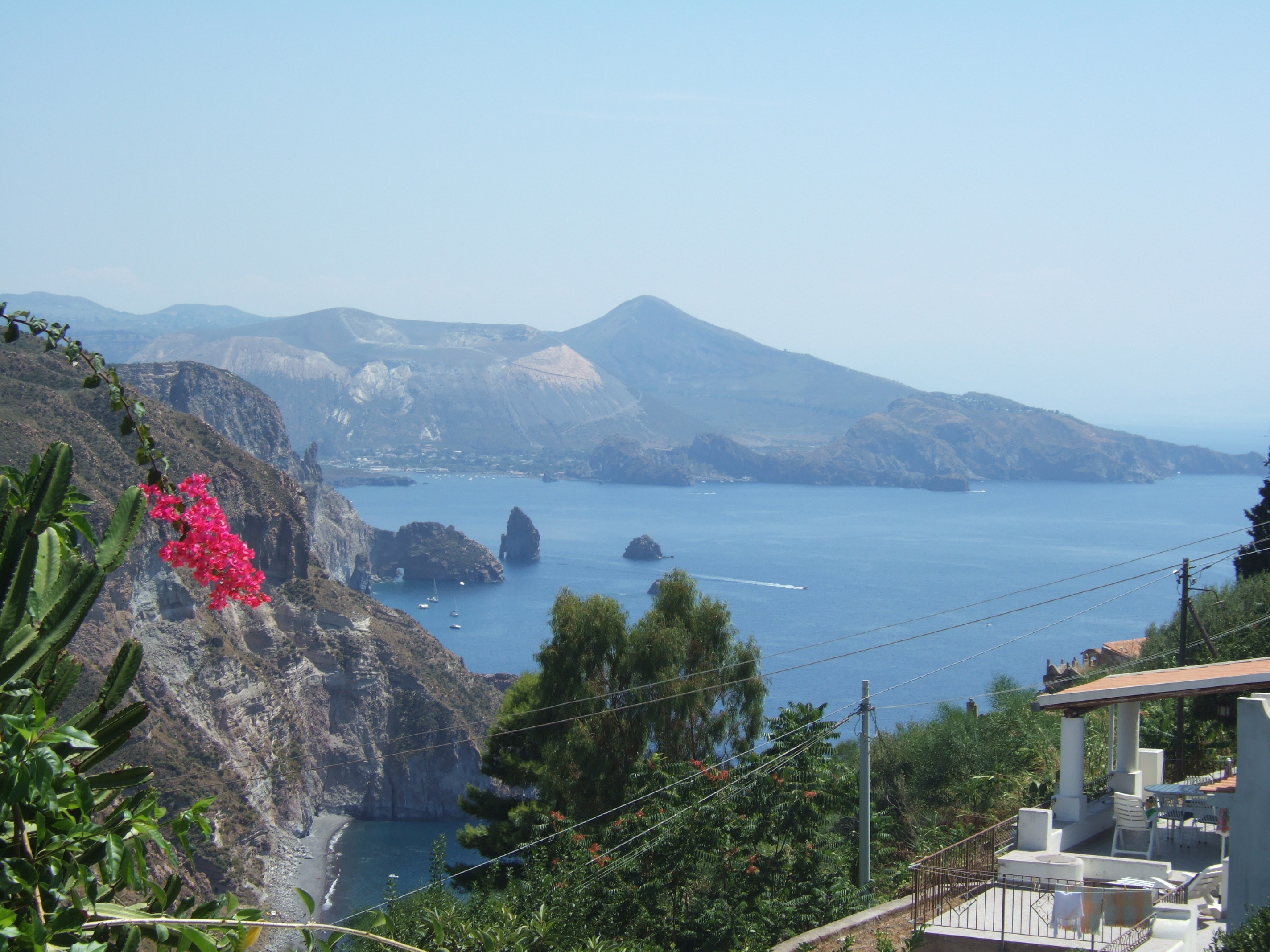
View of Lipari.

Geologists agree on the fact that Lipari (island) was created by a succession of four volcanic movements, the most extensive of which was the third one, presumably lasting from 20,000 BC to 13,000 BC. A further vast phenomenon should have happened around 9000 BC. In the 5th century AD when airborne pumice, together with volcanic ash, covered the Roman villages of the island. The volcanoes are considered active, and steaming fumaroles and hydrothermal activity may still be seen. As a result of its volcanic origin, the island is covered with pumice and obsidian. Pumice mining has become a large industry on Lipari, and the pale pumice from Lipari is shipped worldwide. The last eruption occurred in 1220 AD.

== In popular culture ==
The ending sequence of 1984 film Kaos by Paolo and Vittorio Taviani showed children sliding down the vast slopes of white pumice that flowed into the sea on the island of Lipari. Today the pumice slope stops about 1 metre (3 ft) from the sea.

Christopher Nolan shot his 2026 film The Odyssey throughout the Aeolian Islands and particularly around the island of Lipari, cited by its ancient name of Aeolia after Homer.

== Notable people ==
- Peppino Mangravite (1896–1978) – artist
- Christian Riganò (born 1974) – football manager and former player
- Francesco Scoglio (1941–2005) – football manager

== See also ==
- Diocese of Lipari
- List of volcanoes in Italy
- List of islands of Italy
