= Vacquières =

- Commune
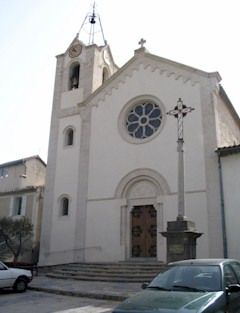
- The church of Vacquières

- Coat of arms
- Location of Vacquières
- Location within France Location within Occitanie
- Coordinates: 43°50′42″N 3°56′43″E
- Country: France
- Region: Occitania
- Department: Hérault
- Arrondissement: Lodève
- Canton: Lodève
- Intercommunality: Grand Pic Saint-Loup

Government
  - Mayor (2020–2026): Jean-Baptiste Panchau
- Area^{1}: 14.74 km^{2} (5.69 sq mi)
- Elevation: 70 m (230 ft)
- Highest elevation: 206 m (676 ft)
- Lowest elevation: 85 m (279 ft)
- Population (2023): 772
  - Density: 52.4/km^{2} (136/sq mi)
- Time zone: UTC+01:00 (CET)
  - Summer (DST): UTC+02:00 (CEST)
- INSEE/Postal code: 34318 /34270
- ^{1} French Land Register data, which excludes lakes, ponds, glaciers > 1 km^{2} (0.386 sq mi or 247 acres) and river estuaries.

Vacquières (French pronunciation: [vakjɛʁ]; Occitan: Vaquièiras) is a commune in the Hérault department in the Occitanie region in southern France. J-B Cavalier produces an organic white wine here.

== Population ==
Historical population
Year	Pop.	±% p.a.
1968	181	—
1975	174	−0.56%
1982	191	+1.34%
1990	231	+2.41%
1999	293	+2.68%
2007	404	+4.10%
2012	455	+2.41%
2017	651	+7.43%
2023	772	+2.88%
Source: INSEE

== See also ==
- Communes of the Hérault department
