= Luigi Bernabò Brea =

Italian archaeologist (1910–1999)

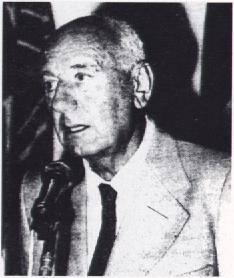

Luigi Bernabò Brea (Genua, 27 September 1910 – Lipari, 4 February 1999) was an Italian archaeologist.

Together with Madeleine Cavalier, a very close collaborator who was briefly his wife, he was responsible for the establishment of the Aeolian Archaeological Museum of Lipari.

== Biography ==
A student of the Italian School of Archaeology at Athens, he was dedicated to the prehistoric and classical archaeology of Sicily, particularly the Aeolian Islands, where for many years he directed the Museo archeologico regionale eoliano, which is now dedicated to him. At first however, he was occupied by study of the prehistory of Liguria and the Aegean.

From 1939 to November 1941 he was the first Superintendent of the Superintendency for Antiquities in Liguria (now the Superintendency for archaeological goods of Liguria).

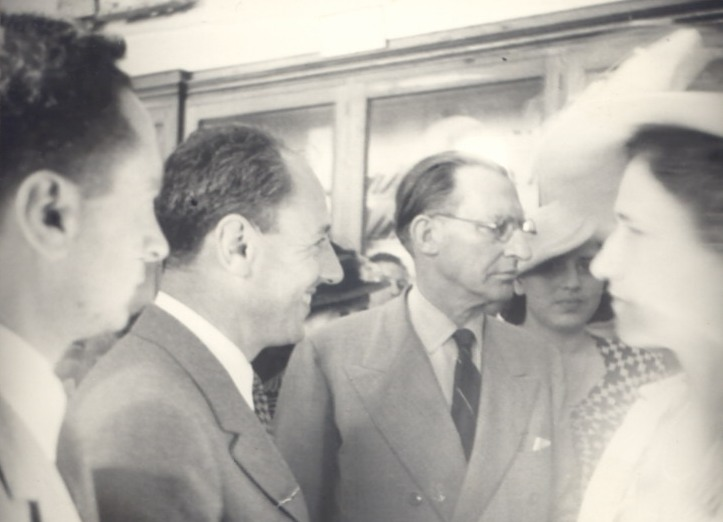
With Alcide De Gasperi in 1948 at the inauguration of the Archaeological Museum of Syracuse.

An early adopter of the stratigraphic method, which he applied in his excavation of Arene Candide (Finale Ligure), he also contributed, through this method, to the typological definition of the cultural facies of the Neolithic in Italy and the Mediterranean. For thirty years he directed the Superintendency for Antiquities in Eastern Sicily and focused on defining the temporal concordances between the Eastern and Western Mediterranean civilisations. This work results from two archaeological excavations: those carried out in Liguria in the caves of Arene Candide and those performed on the acropolis of Lipari. Both revealed a very complete succession of stratigraphic layers which allowed diverse connections with other Mediterranean archaeological sites.

He married his colleague Madeleine Cavalier for a season, but the marriage did not last. Nevertheless, the two continued to be close professional collaborators until Luigi Bernabo Brea's death.

== Bibliography ==
- "Luigi Bernabò Brea", in Biografie e bibliografie degli Accademici Lincei, Roma 1976, pp. 729–732.
- Lucilla de Lachenal, "Biografia di Luigi Bernabò Brea", in Dalle arene candide a Lipari, Roma 2004, pp. 215–216.
