= 1631 eruption of Mount Vesuvius =

Volcanic eruption in Italy

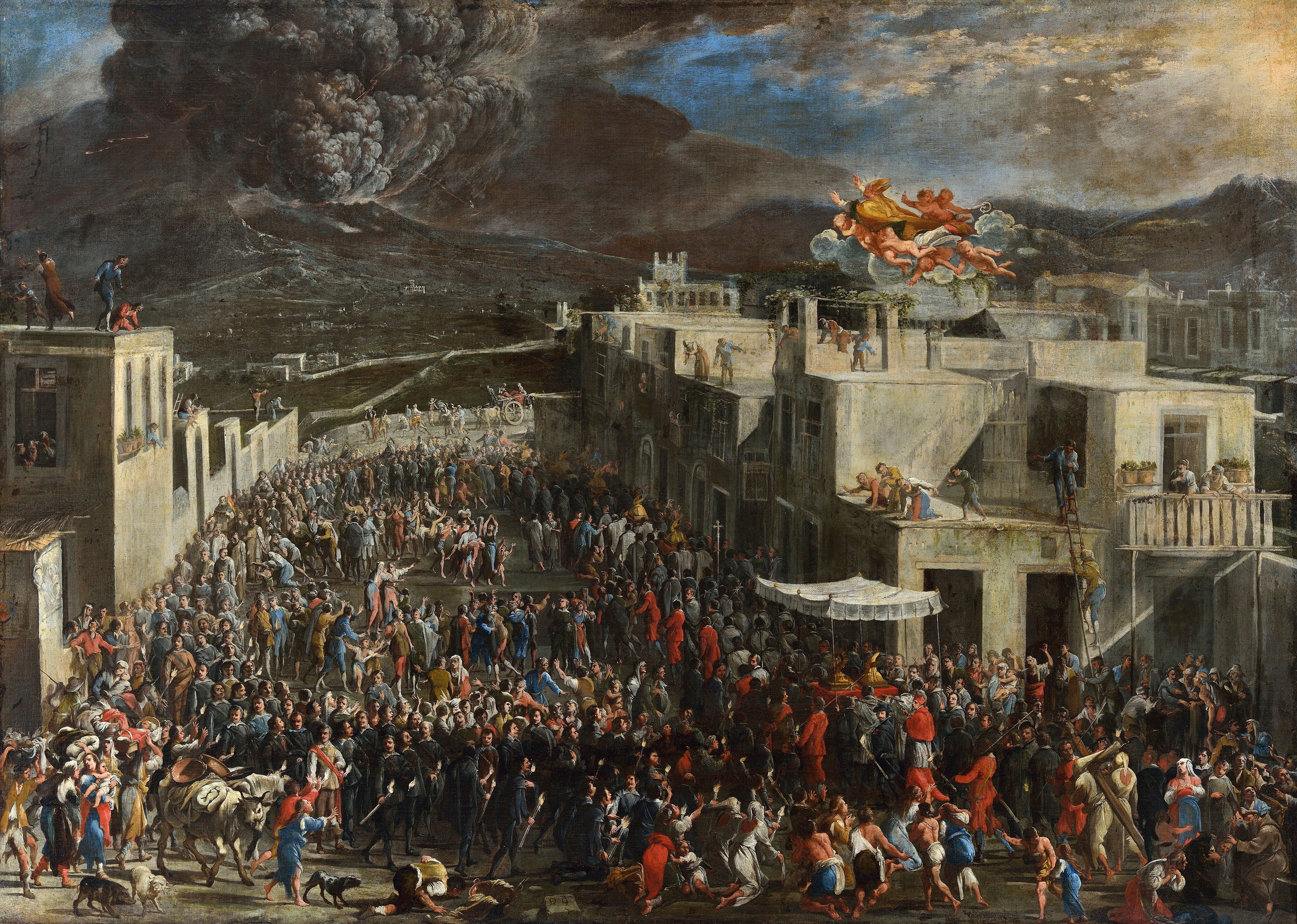
- Domenico Gargiulo, The eruption of the Vesuvius in 1631 (Oil on canvas, Capua private coll.)
- Volcano: Mount Vesuvius
- Start time: 16 December 1631
- End time: c. 31 January 1632
- Type: Plinian eruption
- Location: Campania, Italy
- VEI: 5
- Impact: At least 4,000 people were killed

In December 1631, Mount Vesuvius, a major stratovolcano in Southern Italy, erupted. The eruption resulted in at least 4,000 fatalities, making it the deadliest eruption of Vesuvius since 79 AD.

== History ==
Before it became active again in 1631, Vesuvius had remained for about five centuries in a state of quiescence with its last significant eruption since 1169. A minor eruption was recorded in 1500 by a singular source from Ambrosio Leone, however this event was likely caused due to a phreatic event, increased fumarolic activity, or major rockfall.

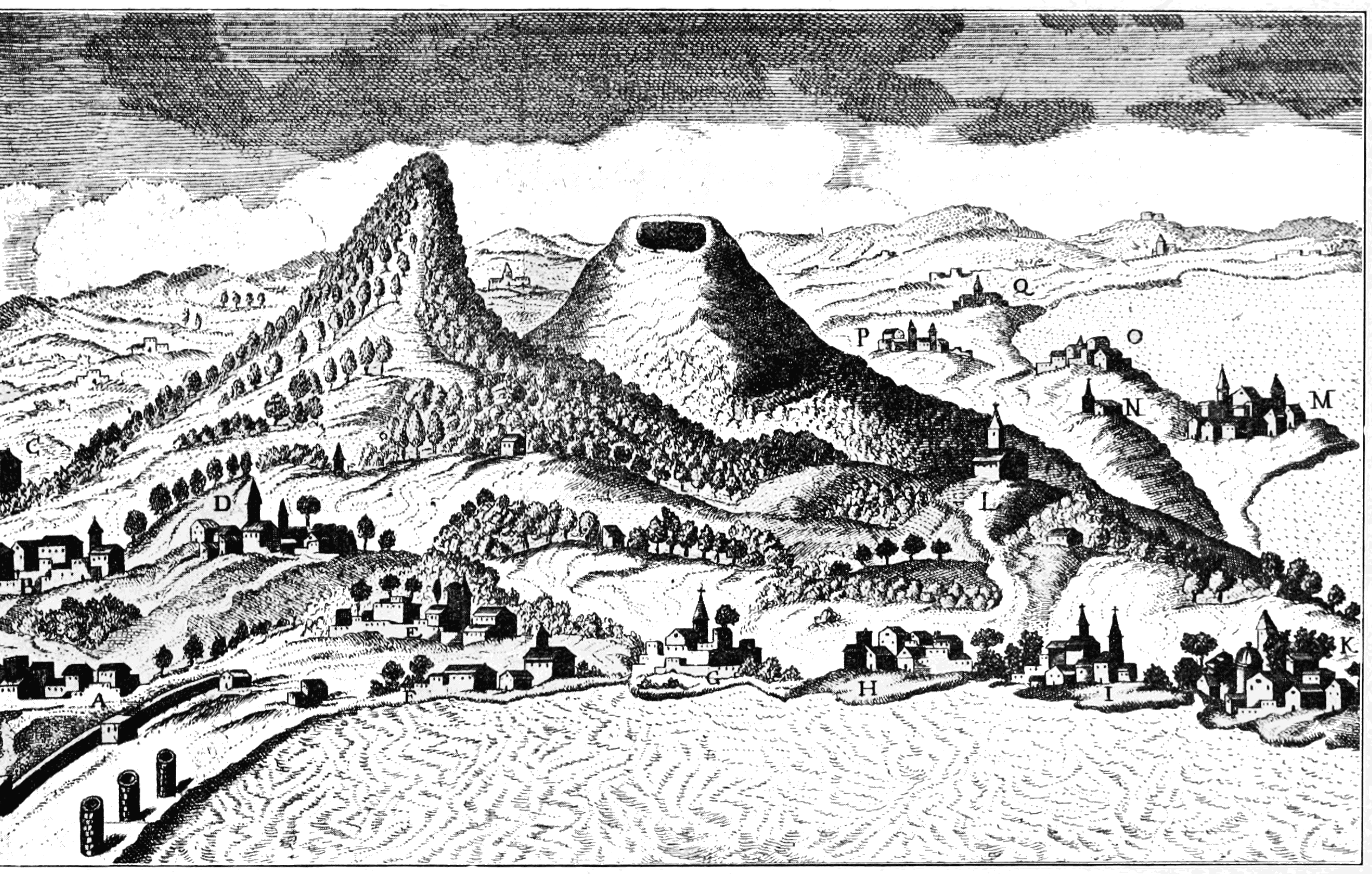
Topography of Mount Vesuvius prior to the 1631 eruption

Prior to the eruption, Mount Vesuvius was lush with dense vegetation. The lower slopes were lined with vineyards and orchards, while higher elevations housed groups of oak and chestnut trees. Inside the crater, forests thrived along with three lakes from which pasturing herds drank from, however they would ultimately disappear due to rising temperatures as Vesuvius began its erupting process.

== Early signs ==
As early as August 1631, visible signs of Vesuvius' reawakening could be seen on the North flank of the Vesuvian cone, where sightings of increased fumarolic activity and nocturnal incandescence were reported. Increased local seismicity would also begin to be perceived starting in December 1631 with the strongest tremors being felt as far away as the Italian city of Napoli, culminating in a grade VII MCS shake on 15 December, followed by an intense earthquake swarm.

Several unusual phenomena preceded the eruption, including acoustic disturbances, ground deformations, gas emissions, and changes in groundwater. From October to December, locals reported rumbling sounds and noises resembling thunder or rockfalls, particularly around Portici and Resina. These noises, likely indicative of volcanic unrest, were most prominent in the western sector of the volcano. Ground deformations, including landslides and soil fracturing, were also observed, particularly on the eastern and western slopes of the mountain. These shifts in the landscape were signs of internal pressure building as magma moved toward the surface. Local vegetation showed signs of distress, with drooping plants and reports of animal disappearances, likely due to the emission of toxic volcanic gases.

In addition to these signs, groundwater around the volcano showed unusual changes. Wells and springs began to produce muddy water, with some sources turning saline, indicating a disturbance in the underlying hydrogeological system. The most dramatic precursor was the intensifying seismic activity. Beginning with minor tremors in late November, the seismic activity escalated by 15 December, with stronger quakes and the eventual opening of an eruptive fissure on the morning of 16 December. These multiple signs of volcanic unrest clearly indicated that the eruption was imminent and provided critical insights into the complex behavior of Vesuvius before it erupted.

== Eruption process ==
The eruption began on 16 December 1631, with the opening of a fissure vent on the western side of Vesuvius, close to the base of the volcanic cone. The explosion caused a giant eruption column, which, pushed by high pressure inside the volcano, reached about 13 km altitude. According to William Hamilton "Giulio Cesare Braccini measured with a quadrant the elevation of the mass of clouds that was formed over Vesuvius during the eruption, and found it to exceed thirty miles in height". The eruption column lasted around 8 hours. Fallout of vesiculated lapilli and lithic clasts occurred until the evening. During the night between 16 and 17 December the volcano produced discrete explosions accompanied by lapilli relapses.

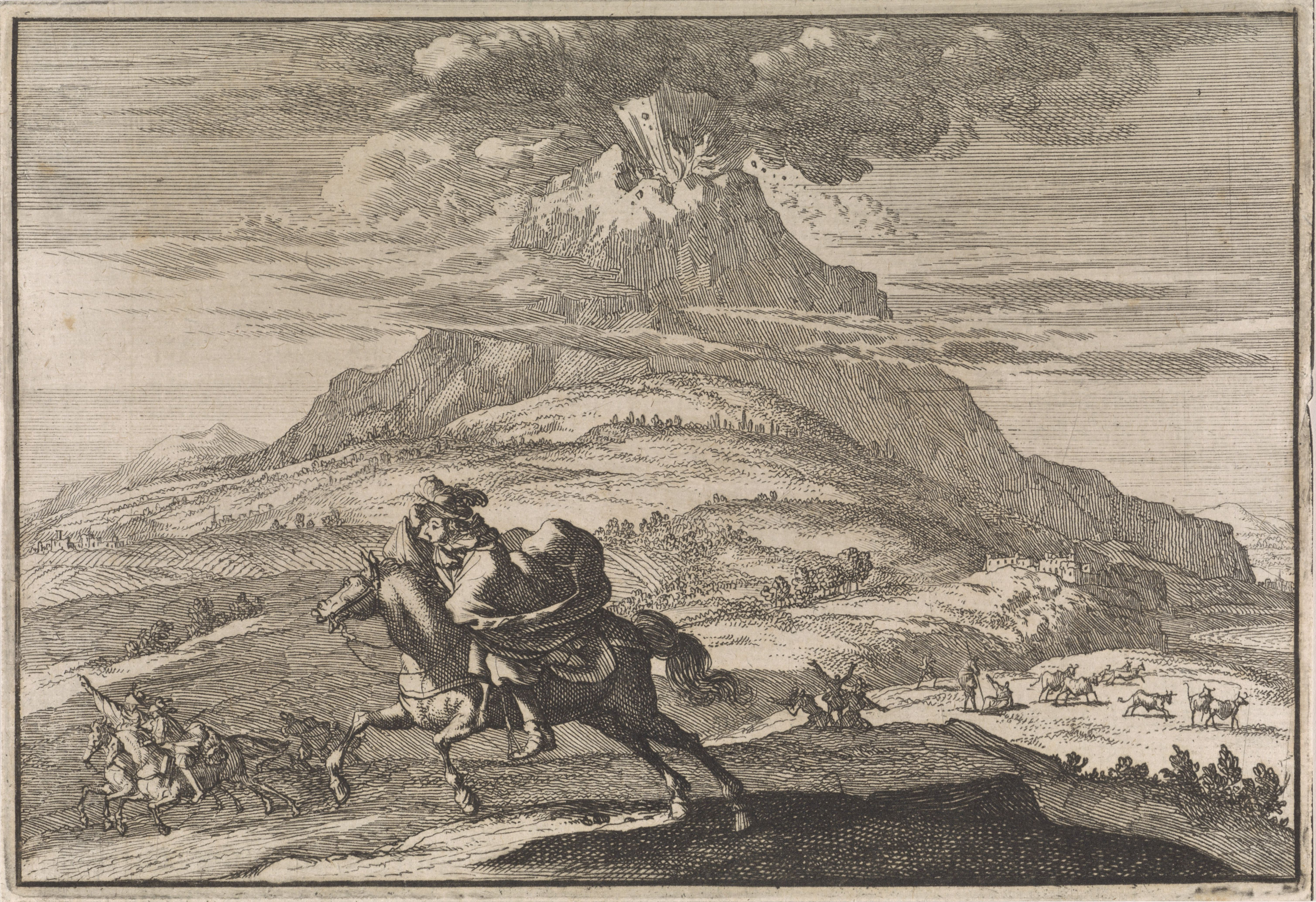
Another depiction of people witnessing the eruption and spreading word via horseback

In the morning of 17 December a violent earthquake occurred, lasting a few minutes. Modern volcanologists have used descriptions from the event to estimate a magnitude of between 4 and 5. The earthquake was immediately followed by the most violent phase of the eruption, characterized by pyroclastic flow activity. The Volcanic Explosivity Index was VEI-5, and it was a Plinian eruption that buried many villages under the resulting lava flows. Large quantities of ashes and dust were ejected and several streams of molten lava poured out of the crater and down the sides of the mountain, overwhelming several villages, including Torre Annunziata, Torre del Greco and Ercolano. Torrents of lahar were also created, adding to the devastation.

== Tectonic setting ==
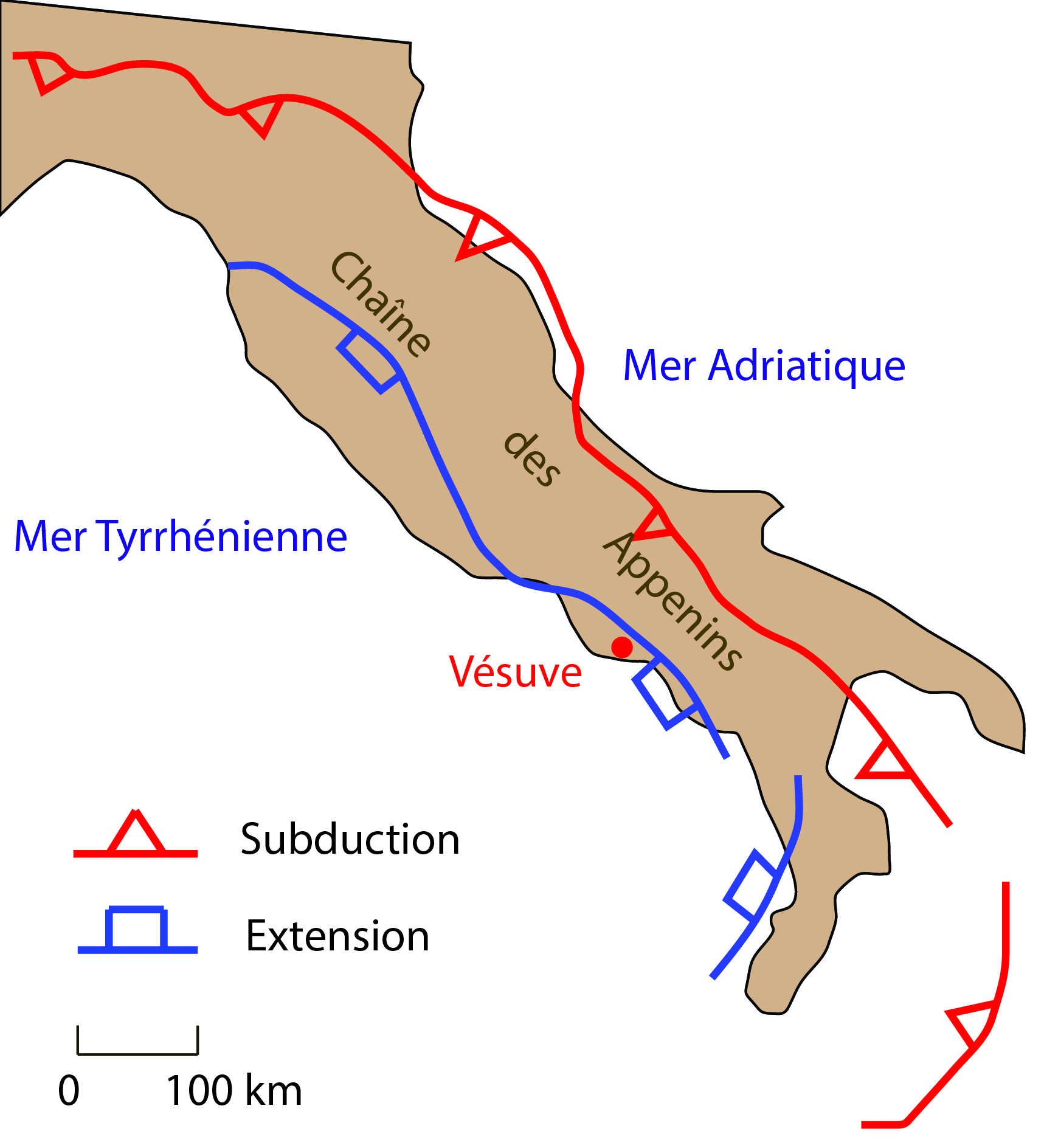
Simplified tectonic context of Vesuvius

As part of the Campanian volcanic arc, the 1631 Vesuvius eruption occurred over the subduction zone formed by the collision between the African and Eurasian tectonic plates, where the oceanic African plate sinks beneath the continental Eurasian plate. In the lower portion of the African plate, geophysical studies reveal a unique tectonic feature: a slab window, created as the lower portion of the subducting African plate tore and detached from the upper portion. This gap in the plate enables upwelling convection currents to interact with enriched mantle materials from the subducted slab, resulting in Vesuvius' distinct volcanic characteristics compared to the other volcanoes in the Campanian arc.

The slab window formed due to differential subduction velocities along the plate boundary, causing stress-induced tearing. This feature is bounded by two faults that accommodate horizontal movement between adjoining sections of the subduction zone. Arc-related magmatism also played a significant role in the lithospheric detachment, with the interaction of convection currents and varying subduction dynamics believed to have driven the slab tear. These processes have distinctly influenced the lithology of Vesuvius.

== Eruption dynamics and deposits ==
{{

=== Volcanic products ===
The 1631 eruption of Mount Vesuvius produced a variety of volcanic materials, including tephra falls, pyroclastic flows, and lava flows, each with distinctive characteristics that have been extensively studied. These deposits provide critical insights into the dynamics of the eruption.

==== Tephra fall deposits ====
The tephra fall deposits from the 1631 eruption are divided into three distinct layers, each reflecting changes in eruptive style and magma composition:

- Layer 1: The basal layer consists of small, light-colored vesiculated pumice with minimal lithic fragments. Its fine-grained nature suggests external water played a role in inhibiting vesiculation during this early phase.
- Layer 2: This intermediate layer is darker and coarser, with pumice fragments containing crystals such as leucite and biotite. It represents a transition to more magmatic activity.
- Layer 3: The uppermost layer is darker and coarser, containing dense, poorly vesiculated pumice and a high proportion of lithic fragments, including altered lava and sedimentary rocks. This layer exhibits reverse grading, indicating an increase in eruptive intensity.

Granulometric analyses reveal a systematic increase in grain size from Layer 1 to Layer 3, with a subsequent decrease in the finer-grained topmost portion (Layer 3').

==== Pyroclastic flows and surges ====
Pyroclastic flows were a significant component of the 1631 eruption, depositing thick, poorly sorted layers in the proximal areas. These deposits, characterized by lithic fragments and scoriaceous pumice, show evidence of high-energy emplacement. Surge deposits, found in localized areas, consist of well-sorted ash and pumice, indicating turbulent flow conditions.

==== Lava flows ====
Lava effusions occurred during the later stages of the eruption, emerging from fractures on the southern slopes of the volcano. The lava flows are predominantly tephrite-phonolite in composition, containing minerals such as leucite, augite, and plagioclase. These flows extended towards the coastline, contributing to the reshaping of the landscape.

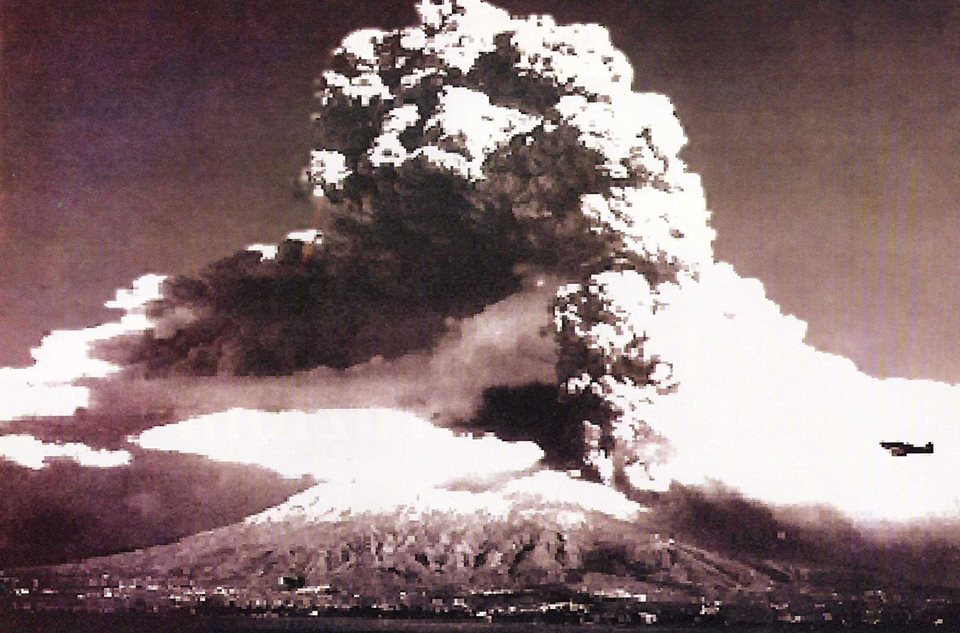
Volcanic deposits depicted from the more recent 1944 eruption at Mount Vesuvius

=== Quantitative analysis ===
The 1631 eruption of Mount Vesuvius has been analyzed quantitatively to estimate parameters such as eruption column height, mass discharge rates, and the physical properties of the deposits. These analyses provide a clearer picture of the eruption's scale and dynamics.

==== Eruption column height and mass discharge rates ====
The height of the eruption column was reconstructed using historical accounts and lithic isopleth maps. The column reached its maximum height of approximately 28 kilometers during the eruption's peak phase. The eruption was characterized by three distinct phases, each associated with different column heights and discharge rates:

- Phase 1: A column height of 16–20 km with a mass discharge rate of 8.9 × 10^{6} kg/s.
- Phase 2: A column height of 25 km and an increased discharge rate of 2.0 × 10^{7} kg/s.
- Phase 3: The peak phase, with a column height of 28 km and a mass discharge rate of 8.2 × 10^{7} kg/s.

The variations in column height and discharge rates reflect changes in eruptive dynamics, including transitions from phreatomagmatic to magmatic activity.

==== Granulometric and chemical analysis ====
Detailed granulometric studies of the tephra deposits revealed trends in grain size and composition:

- An increase in grain size and density of pumice from the base to the top of the sequence.
- A higher lithic content in the upper layers, indicating vent erosion and increased magma fragmentation.

Chemical analyses showed a progression from phonotephritic to tephrite-phonolitic magma, with the upper layers of the deposit containing denser, less vesiculated pumice.

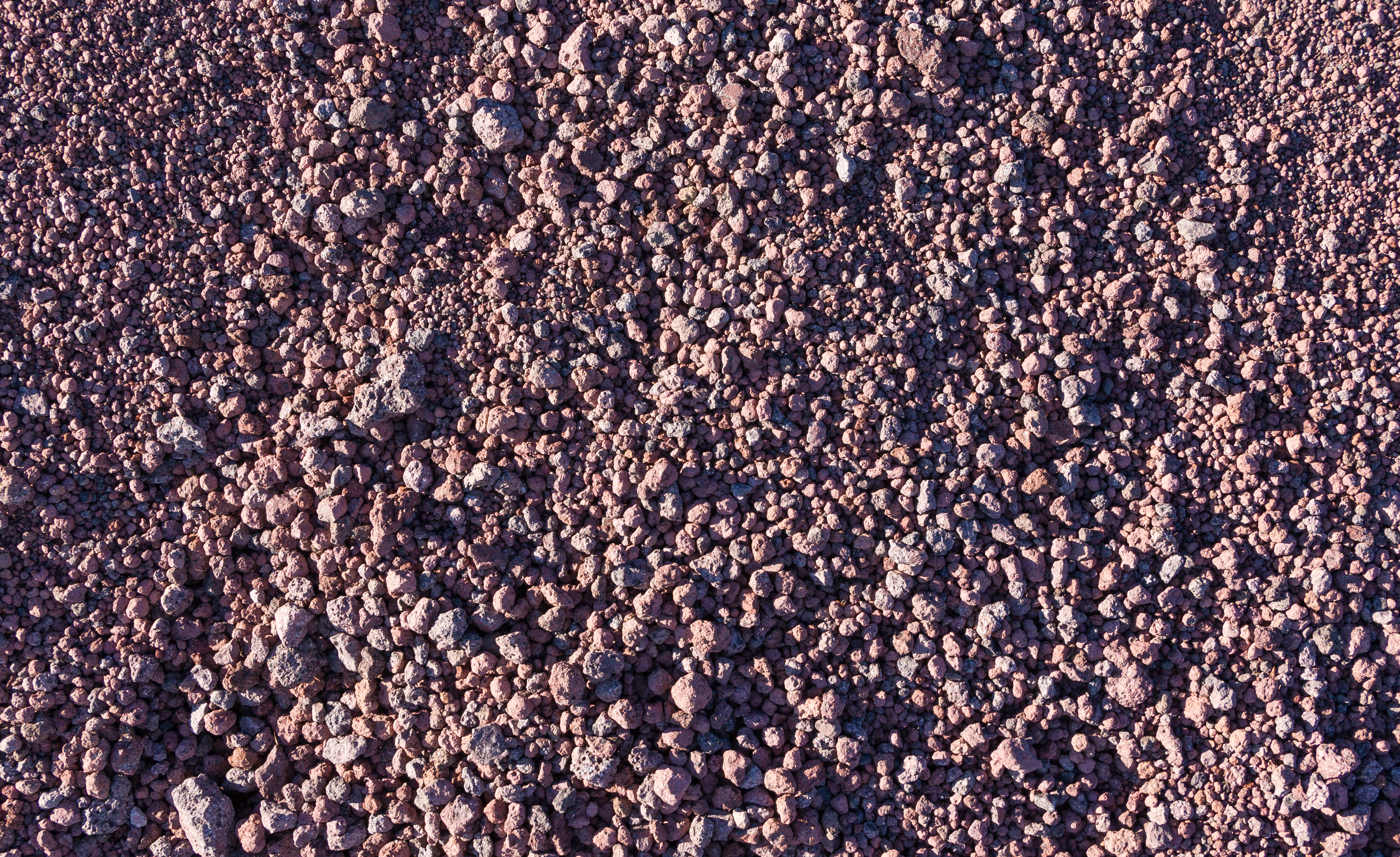
Volcanic deposits from Mount Vesuvius called Puzzolane stones

==== Fragmentation and dispersal ====
Using the dispersal and fragmentation indices, the deposits were classified into different eruptive styles:

- Layer 1: Surtseyan activity associated with external water interaction.
- Layer 2: Subplinian activity driven by magmatic volatiles.
- Layer 3: Vulcanian activity characterized by denser and less vesiculated magma.

These indices also demonstrate the influence of wind and column dynamics on the dispersal of tephra, with fallout predominantly affecting the northeast sector of the volcano.

== Effects and casualties ==
The 1631 eruption was considered to be of minor proportions regarding its eruptive magnitude and erupted volumes compared to the AD 79 eruption. However, there was a lot of damage that the region sustained due to the eruption. It is estimated that around 4,000 people were killed by the eruption, making it the highest death toll for a volcanic disaster in the Mediterranean in the last 1800 years. Pyroclastic flows, ash falls, and toxic gases caused a majority of the deaths in nearby villages, including Torre del Greco, as many people ended up being suffocated or buried under debris. The list of casualties might have been higher still, had it not been for a rescue mission conducted three days later to save stranded villagers.

In addition, the infrastructure of the region was severely damaged by several factors. Fast-moving pyroclastic flows and lahars not only swarmed and killed villagers but quickly destroyed many buildings as well. Many buildings were also weakened by seismic activity occurring throughout the eruption process, and eventually collapsed under the weight of accumulated ash or were wiped out by succeeding lava flows. The town of Naples was not directly damaged by the eruption, but food supply from the Vesuvius neighborhood was interrupted. Ash falls contributed to the destruction of farmlands, killing plant life and causing land infertility on a large scale. The accumulation of ash and debris also blocked ports, which limited the trade that Naples had once thrived from. The loss of trade coupled with the loss of agriculture not only stopped the food supply but ruined the economy as well.

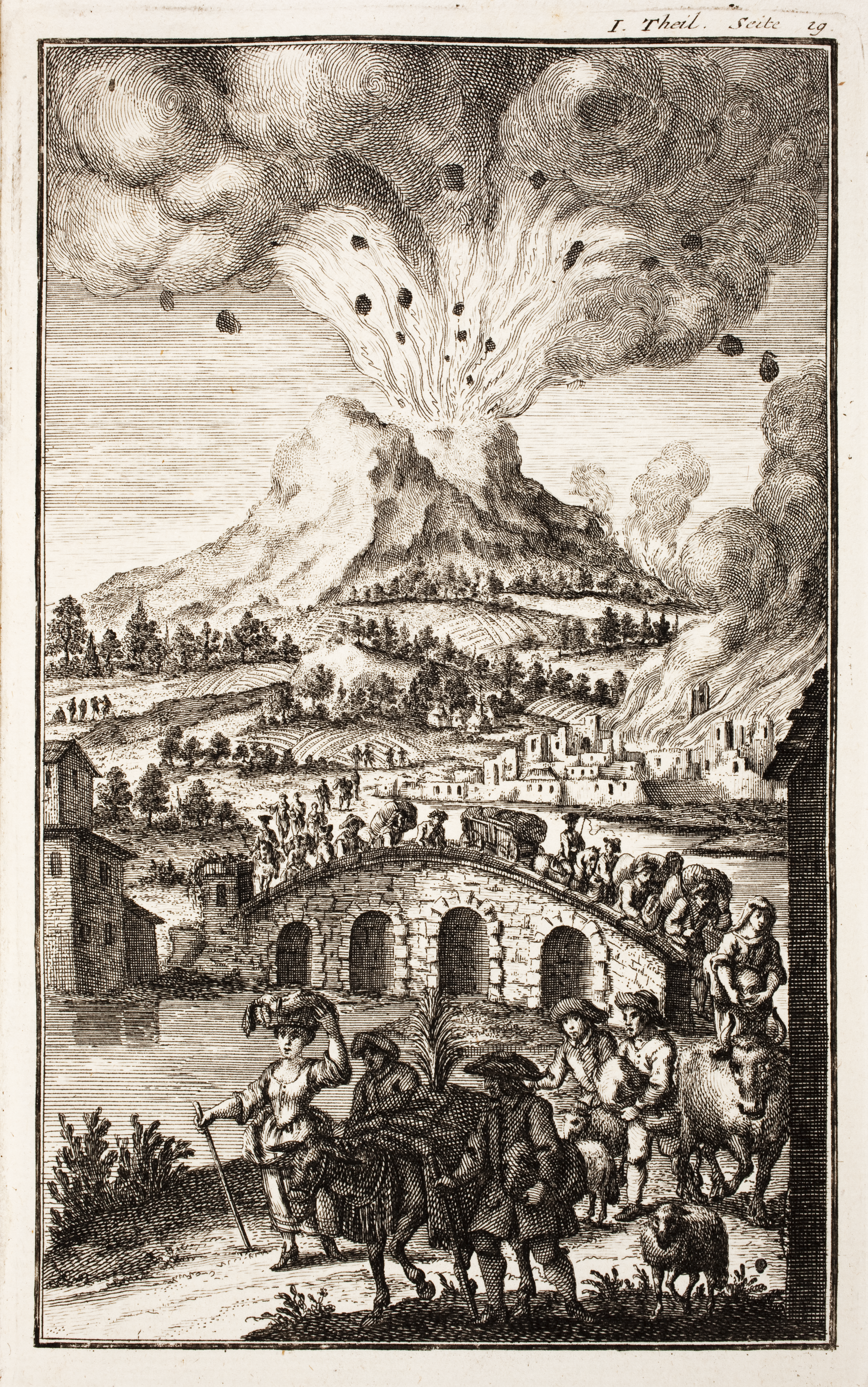
Painting depicting villagers and townsfolk escaping the volcanic eruption

Additionally, many townsfolk living in towns surrounding Vesuvius had lost their homes and their livelihoods. Seeking a way to rebuild their lives, over 20,000 refugees rushed into the town of Naples, the heart of the kingdom. This created problems of public order that worsened the existing issues that plagued Naples.

Due to the proximity of Vesuvius to Naples, this eruption was broadly described by contemporary authors and its study affected the evolution of natural philosophy in the first half of the 17th century. Scholars flocked to Naples to study the phenomenon and to collect mineral specimens from the mountainside. Some historians argue that this investigation and engagement with Vesuvius was paramount to the development of modern volcanology.

By the 1631 eruption, the summit of Mount Vesuvius had been reduced by 450m, making its total height lower than that of Mount Somma. The eruption marked the beginning of a long period of almost continuous eruptive activity by Vesuvius, that lasted until the eighteenth century.

== Change in scientific understanding ==
The 1631 eruption jump-started a massive shift in the understanding of volcanic events. Previously, volcanic events were largely regarded as acts of divine intervention. During this time period, many people believed that a volcano erupted because the Gods were attempting to punish humans for their failure to adhere to proper morals. Much of the Roman population that once populated the area believed that the volcano erupted because of Vulcan, the god of fire and volcanoes, who demonstrated his power by sparking volcanic eruptions. The Romans also attributed eruptions to other gods from their pantheon, including Jupiter(the king of the gods) and Neptune(the god of earthquakes) who was believed to be responsible for seismic activity that occurred before an eruption.

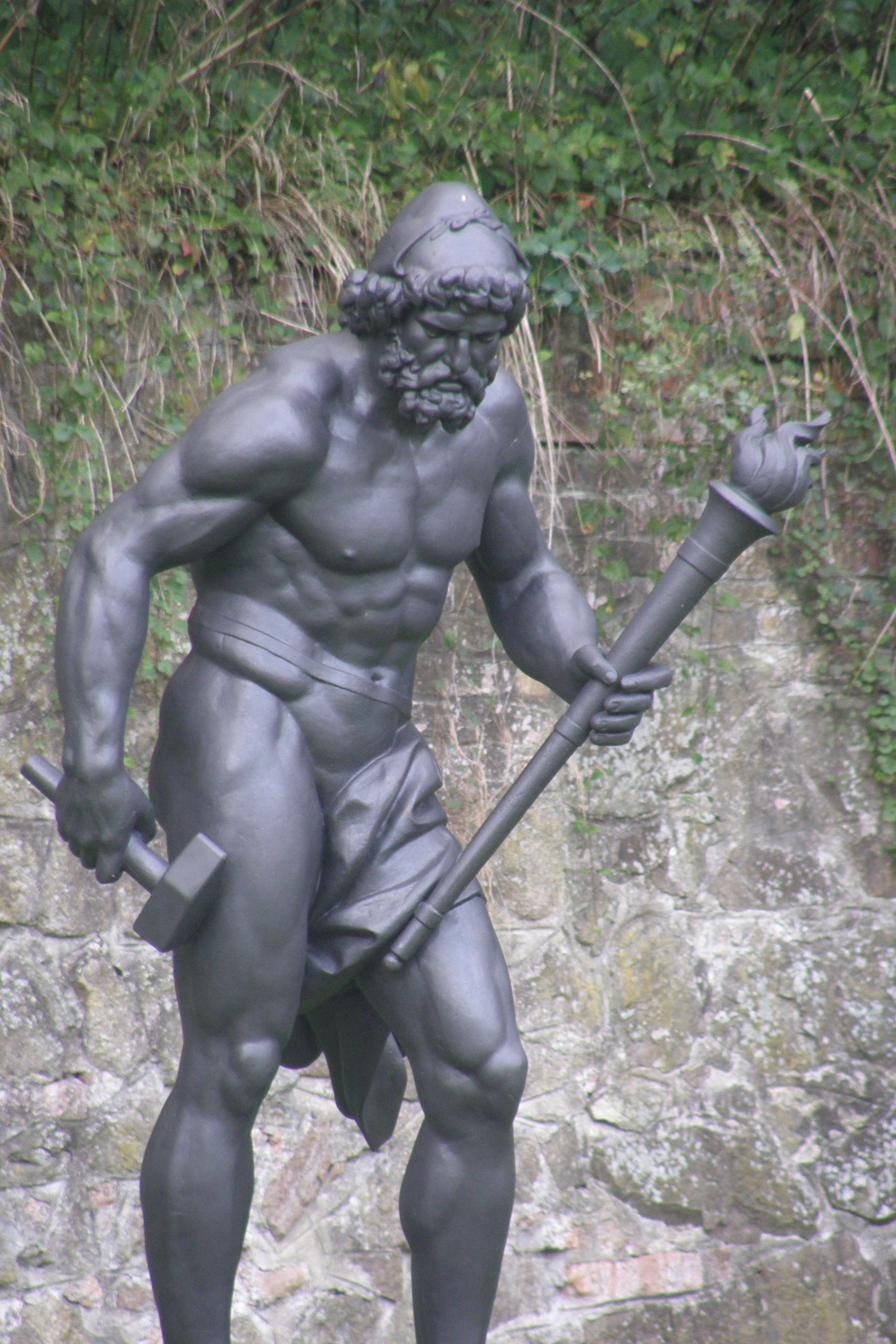
Statue depicting Vulcan, the god of fire, who was often associated with volcanic eruptions

The Romans assumed that they were being punished for angering the gods. It was believed that humans incurred the wrath of the gods for a number of reasons. Among other things, a failure to properly observe rituals and morals was commonly used to justify the anger of the gods. The idea of divine intervention was attributed to the 1631 eruption as well. Although the population in the region was predominantly Roman Catholic at this time period, so they believed their singular god was punishing the town for its collective decadence and immorality.

As mentioned previously, many scholars flocked to Naples to study the eruption. The initiative to understand volcanic events grew out of a need to limit damages and loss of life in the future(which was highlighted by the 1631 eruption). This growing interest was also attributed to a spread of intellectualism that would later transform into the Enlightenment. Additionally, the 17th century saw a spike in printing technology and an increased usage of the printing press. More and more people were documenting and spreading information around the world via paper. Regarding the eruption, scholars such as Giuseppe Palmieri could record observations and communicate their ideas on what may have caused the eruption. As a result, the 1631 eruption became one the first well-documented volcanic events in history.

At this point in time, scholars were beginning to abandon explanations that relied on mythological and religious beliefs. Instead, they started to search for more rational explanations that showed why natural phenomena such as the 1631 eruption were happening. The studies conducted on this eruption in particular were part of the movement towards a greater scientific understanding.

The 1631 eruption further promoted an ongoing increase in scientific and intellectual curiosity, in which people were changing their ways of thinking.

== Vesuvius Observatory ==
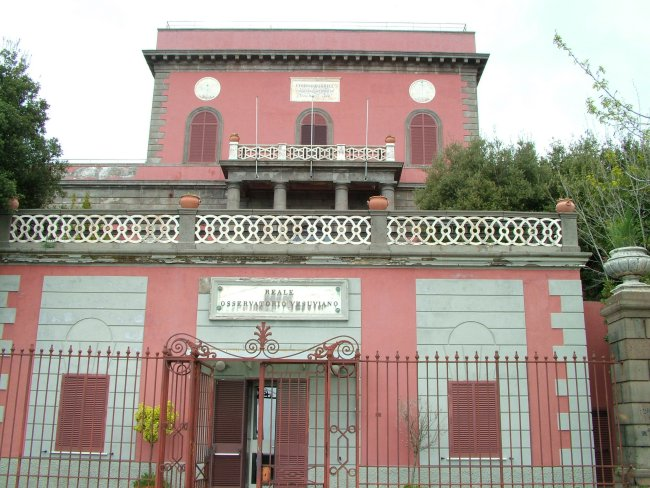
Building for Vesuvius Observatory in 1841, the oldest volcanology institute in the world.

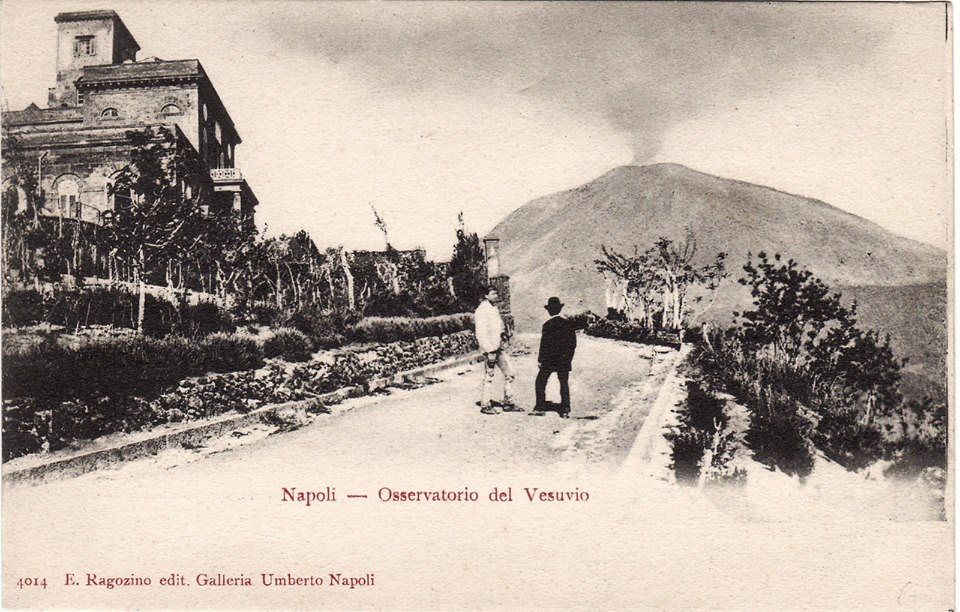
Image of Vesuvius Observatory and Mount Vesuvius(c. 19th Century)

In 1841, around 200 years after the 1631 eruption, the Vesuvius Observatory was established. This marked a huge milestone in the study of volcanology, as it was the first ever volcanological observatory. As a matter of fact, The designs and implementations for many later observatories were inspired by the Vesuvius Observatory. In particular, the Vesuvius Observatory was established by the Italian government as a means to keep watch over Vesuvius, which had multiple large-scale eruptions throughout its history. The despair and destruction caused by the 1631 eruption underscored the need for a deeper understanding of volcanoes. Thus, the purpose of the observatory was both to predict and prepare for dangerous eruptions and to enhance the common understanding of volcanology in the modern age.

The observatory was placed on the southern slope of Mount Vesuvius (far from the crater to stay out of danger), in a Campanian town called Herculaneum. Here, it could monitor changes in gas emissions, seismic activity, and deformation by observing the natural patterns and processes that occurred. For example, in the 1800s the observatory would employ tools such as seismometers, used to detect seismic activity that might precede an eruption. Additionally, barometers and thermometers were also used to measure changes in atmospheric pressure and temperature.

Today, the observatory belongs to an Italian research organization called the National Institute of Geophysics and Volcanology (INGV). As in the past, the observatory continues to contribute readily to improving early warning systems and risk analysis. It also continues to serve as a center for volcanological research, and publishes findings and observations on the regular to boost public awareness.

== Possibility of a future eruption ==
Vesuvius is considered as an active volcano that has repeatedly demonstrated the potential to host devastating volcanic events. Being that the volcano is located in a subduction zone, magma is constantly being generated in this area via flux melting.

In other words, the lowering of the African plate into the much hotter Earth is releasing water, which lowers the melting point of the above Eurasian plate. So while the African plate is subducting under the Eurasian plate, the magma chamber beneath Vesuvius is constantly being supplied with magma. For this reason, a future eruption is always possible.

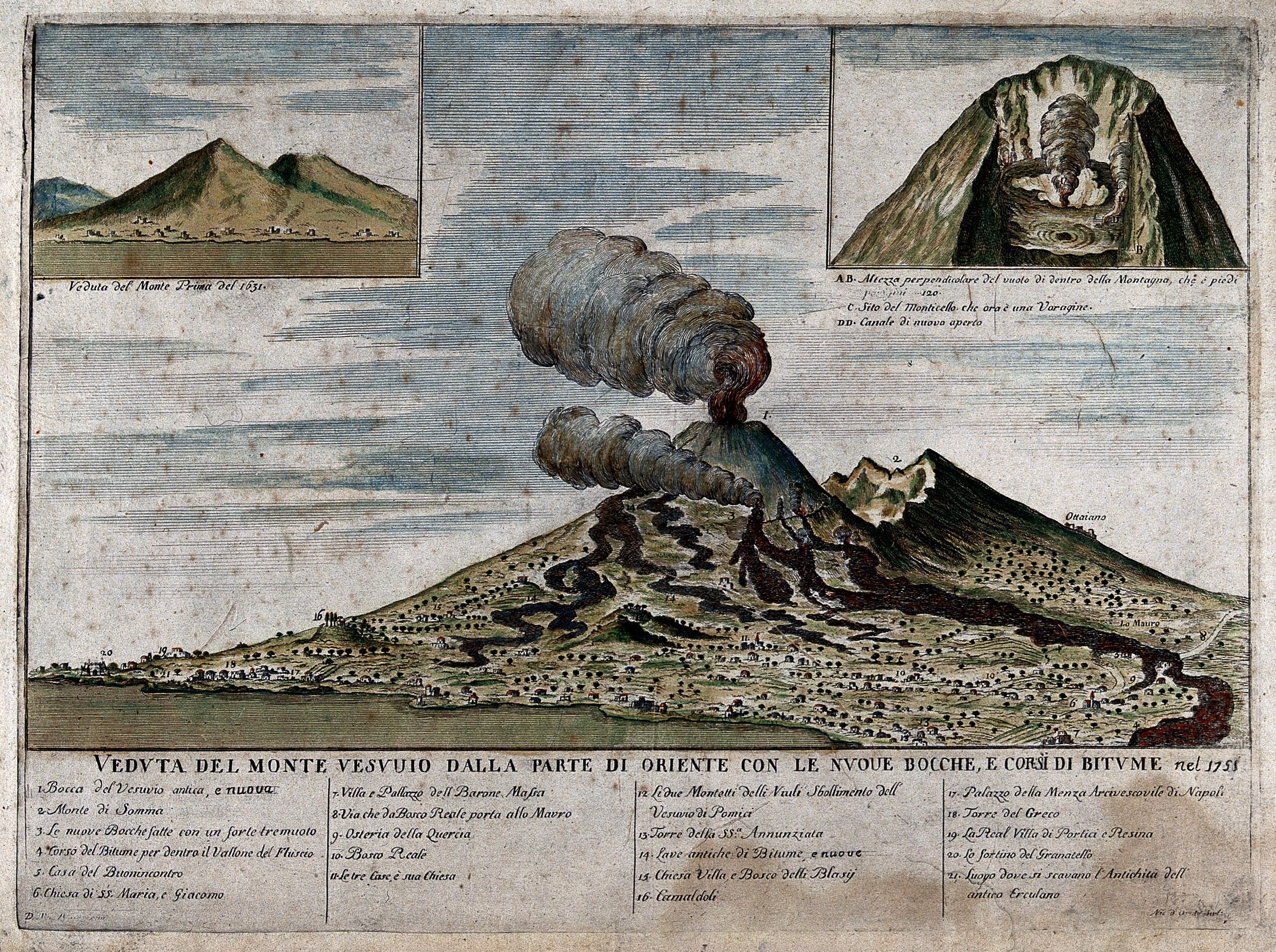
Mount Vesuvius erupting in 1755, seen from the west, with two small views of the volcano in 1631, and of the volcano's crater in section

A diagram that depicts a tectonic setting similar to that of Mount Vesuvius and the Campanian volcanic arc

Other factors also play into the expectation for an eruption. Historically, Vesuvius has erupted on a large scale every 300–400 years. The Vesuvius Observatory has also detected bulging in the Earth's crust; release of gasses such as sulfur dioxide, carbon dioxide, and water; and seismic activity have all been observed on multiple occasions within the past century.

While it is not possible to predict the exact timing of the eruption, the Italian government and the INGV are continuously monitoring the volcano to be aware of a potential volcanic event. The government has made and will continue to improve warning systems and evacuation plans to deal with such a disaster.

== See also ==
- AD 79 eruption of Mount Vesuvius

== Bibliography ==
- Rolandi, G.; Barrella, A.M.; Borrelli, A. (1993). "The 1631 eruption of Vesuvius". J. Volcanol. Geotherm. Res. 58 (1–4): 183–201. doi:10.1016/0377-0273(93)90107-3.
- Hamilton, William (1795). "An Account of the Late Eruption of Mount Vesuvius. In a Letter from the Right Honourable Sir William Hamilton, K. B. F. R. S. to Sir Joseph Banks, Bart. P. R. S.". Philos. Trans. R. Soc. 85: 73–116. JSTOR 106945.
- Nazzaro, Antonio (1985). "Il Vesuvio: storia naturale dal 1631 al 1944". Bollettino della Società dei naturalisti in Napoli. 94: 99–124.
- Carracedo, J.C.; Principe, C.; Rosi, M.; Soler, V. (1993). "Time correlation by palaeomagnetism of the 1631 eruption of Mount Vesuvius. Volcanological and volcanic hazard implications". J. Volcanol. Geotherm. Res. 58 (1–4): 203–209. doi:10.1016/0377-0273(93)90108-4.
- Principe, Claudia; Tanguy, Jean Claude; Arrighi, Simone; Paiotti, Anna; Le Goff, Maxime; Zoppi, Ugo (2004). "Chronology of vesuvius activity from A.D. 79 to 1631 based on archeomagnetism of lavas and historical sources". Bull. Volcanol. 66 (8): 703–724. doi:10.1007/s00445-004-0348-8.
- Cocco, Sean (2013). Watching Vesuvius. A History of Science and Culture in Early Modern Italy. Chicago: University of Chicago Press. ISBN 978-0-22-692371-0.
- Everson, Jane E. (2012). "The melting pot of science and belief: studying Vesuvius in seventeenth-century Naples". Renaiss. Stud. 26 (5): 691–727. doi:10.1111/j.1477-4658.2011.00766.x. JSTOR 24420135.
- Tortora, Alfonso (2014). L'eruzione vesuviana del 1631: una storia d'età moderna (in Italian). Rome: Carocci editore. ISBN 978-8-84-306049-8.
- Stoppa, Francesco; Principe, Claudia; Schiazza, Mariangela; Liu, Yu; Giosa, Paola; Crocetti, Sergio (2017). "Magma evolution inside the 1631 Vesuvius magma chamber and eruption triggering". Open Geosciences. 9 (1): 24–52. Bibcode:2017OGeo....9....3S. doi:10.1515/geo-2017-0003. ISSN 2391-5447.
