= Alessandro Malladra =

Italian volcanologist

- Born: 1865; Turin
- Died: 1945 (aged 79–80); Rome
- Education: University of Turin
- Known for: Il Vesuvio dal 1906 al 1920 (1926)
- Scientific career
- Fields: volcanology
- Workplaces: Vesuvius Observatory

Alessandro Malladra (Turin, 1865 – Rome, 1945) was an Italian volcanologist. He was professor of natural sciences at the College Mellerio Rosmini-Domodossola. He got involved in the construction of the Simplon Tunnel. He succeeded Giuseppe Mercalli at the Vesuvius Observatory, first as curator and afterwards as director (1927–1935). He was general secretary of the Volcanology Section of the International Union of Geodesy and Geophysics (1919–1936) and, simultaneously, president for one period (1927–1933). The fluorosilicate mineral malladrite (Na_{2}SiF_{6}) was named in his honour.

== Selected publications ==
- Malladra, Alessandro (1926). Il Vesuvio dal 1906 al 1920. Napoli, Tip. Università. p. 96.

== Additional sources ==
- Maddalena De Lucia, Massimo Russo, "120 Years of Italian and Vesuvius History in the Lava Medals Collection of the Osservatorio Vesuviano", poster.
- History of the Vesuvius Observatory.
- Treccani.it - L'Enciclopedia italiana.
