= Francesco Signore =

Italian volcanologist

- Born: 1886
- Died: November 29, 1959 (aged 72–73); Naples
- Scientific career
- Fields: Volcanologist
- Institutions: Vesuvius Observatory

Francesco Signore (1886 – 29 November 1959) was an important Italian volcanologist. He began his scientific career as assistant at the "Istituto di Fisica Terrestre", Naples. He served his country during World War I (1915 to 1919). He was nominated assistant at the Vesuvius Observatory (1928). He taught volcanology at the faculty of science, University of Naples (1934–1956). He was secretary general of the International Association of Volcanology and Chemistry of the Earth's Interior (IAVECI) from 1936 until his death.

He married Livia Lollini (daughter of Vittorio Lollini) in the year 1928.

== Selected publications ==
- Signore, F. (1923) "Il bradisismo in relazione coll'attività vulcanica nei Campi Flegrei". Boll. Società Naturalisti di Napoli, vol. XXXV.
- Signore, F. (1925) "Il Golfo di Napoli dal punto di vista della geofisica". Atti del 1 Congresso regionale dell'associazione Medica Italiana di Idrologia. Napoli.
- Signore, F. (1929) "Il Reale Osservatorio Vesuviano e la sua attività scientifica". Rivista di Fisica, Matematica e Scienze Naturali, vol. II, May–June.
