= Frank A. Perret =

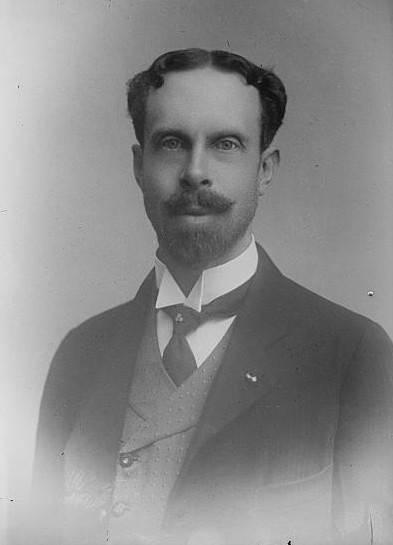
Frank A. Perret on 16 October 1909

Frank Alvord Perret (2 August 1867 in Hartford, Connecticut – January 12, 1943 in New York City) was an American entrepreneur, inventor, and volcanologist, who was particularly well known for his studies of eruptions of Vesuvius, Kilauea and Mount Pelée.

== Career as an Engineer ==
He studied physics at Polytechnic Institute of New York University and was then employed in the laboratories of Thomas Edison on the Lower East Side, where he worked on the development of engines and dynamos. In 1886, he founded the Elektron Manufacturing Company, together with John A. Barrett, a small company that designed and produced electronic devices. Frank A. Perret became involved in the development of the theory of electromotive forces (EMFs) (s:.Counter-electromotive force, CEMF), and invented the Perret electric motor. In 1889, Perret appointed Elihu H. Cutler to oversee the expansion of the company, and with it a new factory in Springfield in Massachusetts. Among other things, Perret's company built elevators, and was later acquired in 1906 by the Otis Elevator Company. In 1902, Perret fell ill having suffered 'nervous prostration caused by overwork'. In 1903, Perret went to Italy to recuperate, and it was there in Naples, that he had his first encounter with Vesuvius. He soon made the acquaintance of the Director of the Vesuvius Volcano Observatory, Prof. Raffaele V. Matteucci, and by 1906 had become Prof. Matteucci's honorary assistant at the Observatory.

== Contributions to Volcanology ==
During April 1906, Perret and Matteucci observed a major eruption of Vesuvius, during which Perret took numerous photographs and made many observations of eruptive phenomena, including St Elmo's Fire. Perret eventually published a major monograph on this eruption in 1924. In her obituary of Perret, Mildred Giblin wrote that Perret's monograph on the Vesuvius was "the clearest and most comprehensive report ever on a volcanic eruption and its aftermath published". By the end of the first decade of the 20th century Perret had also visited the volcanoes of Kilauea, Stromboli, Etna, Mount Teide and Sakurajima. In 1909 Perret suggested to the geophysicists Thomas Jaggar from Massachusetts Institute of Technology and Reginald A. Daly of Harvard University to establish a continuous monitoring station at Kilauea. Perret spent four months on Kilauea in 1911, where he began to make the first long-term observations of activity from the edge of the crater Halemaʻumaʻu. The station was the forerunner of the Hawaiian Volcano Observatory, which was built by Thomas Jaggar the following year. When Mount Pelée on the French Caribbean island of Martinique became active again in 1929, some years after the devastating eruption of 1902 Perret was one of the first scientists on site. During the three years of volcanic activity, from 1929-1932, he conducted numerous investigations and in 1931 he built a small observation hut on the Morne Lenard above the valley of the Riviere Blanch as the first permanent station on the mountain. Perret published a monograph on the Pelee eruptions in 1936. During his extended stay on Martinique, Perret raised funds to establish a volcanological museum in St Pierre, to 'tell the story of the Modern Pompeii'. The founders of this enterprise included a local rum merchant, Victor Depaz, and philanthropists Vincent Astor, William L Mellon and George F Baker. The Musée Franck A. Perret volcanological museum opened in 1933, and re-opened in 2019 after renovations as the Frank Perret Museum - Memorial to the 1902 Catastrophe.

The scientific contributions of Mr. Perret are unique in that no other volcanologist had the time and opportunity to make so thorough and varied observations on so many types of active volcanoes. He was a daring .. researcher, indefatigable in his quest for information.

— Mildred Giblin (1950)

== Correspondents ==
Perret devoted his life after 1904 to the study of volcanoes. He didn't receive a salary for his work, but relied instead on financial support from donors as well as income from the sale of photographs, and postcards. Among his many correspondents around the world were violinist Nicoline Zedeler and her husband, Emil Mix. From 1911, Perret received an honorarium from the Geophysical Laboratory of the Carnegie Institution of Washington, where he was later appointed as Research Associate. The Carnegie Institution hosts an extensive archive of Perret's scientific correspondence, along with a photographic collection.

== Publications (selection) ==
- "The lava fountains of Kilauea", in American Journal of Science, No. 4, 1913, Pages 139-148
- "The circulatory system in the Halemaumau lava lake during the summer of 1911", in American Journal of Science, No. 4, 1913, Pages 337-349
- "Volcanic research at Kilauea in the summer of 1911", in American Journal of Science, No. 4, 1913, Pages 475-488
- "The Eruption of Mount Pelee 1929 - 1932". Carnegie Institution of Washington, Publication 458, Washington DC, 1935
- "What to expect of a volcano", in Natural History, No. 2, 1937, Pages 99–105
- Obituary by Mildred Giblin in Bulletin of Volcanology, 1950, Pages 191-195
- Volcanological Observations, Carnegie Institution of Washington, Publication 549, Washington DC, 1950
