= National Institute of Geophysics and Volcanology =

Research institute in Italy

- Istituto nazionale di geofisica e vulcanologia
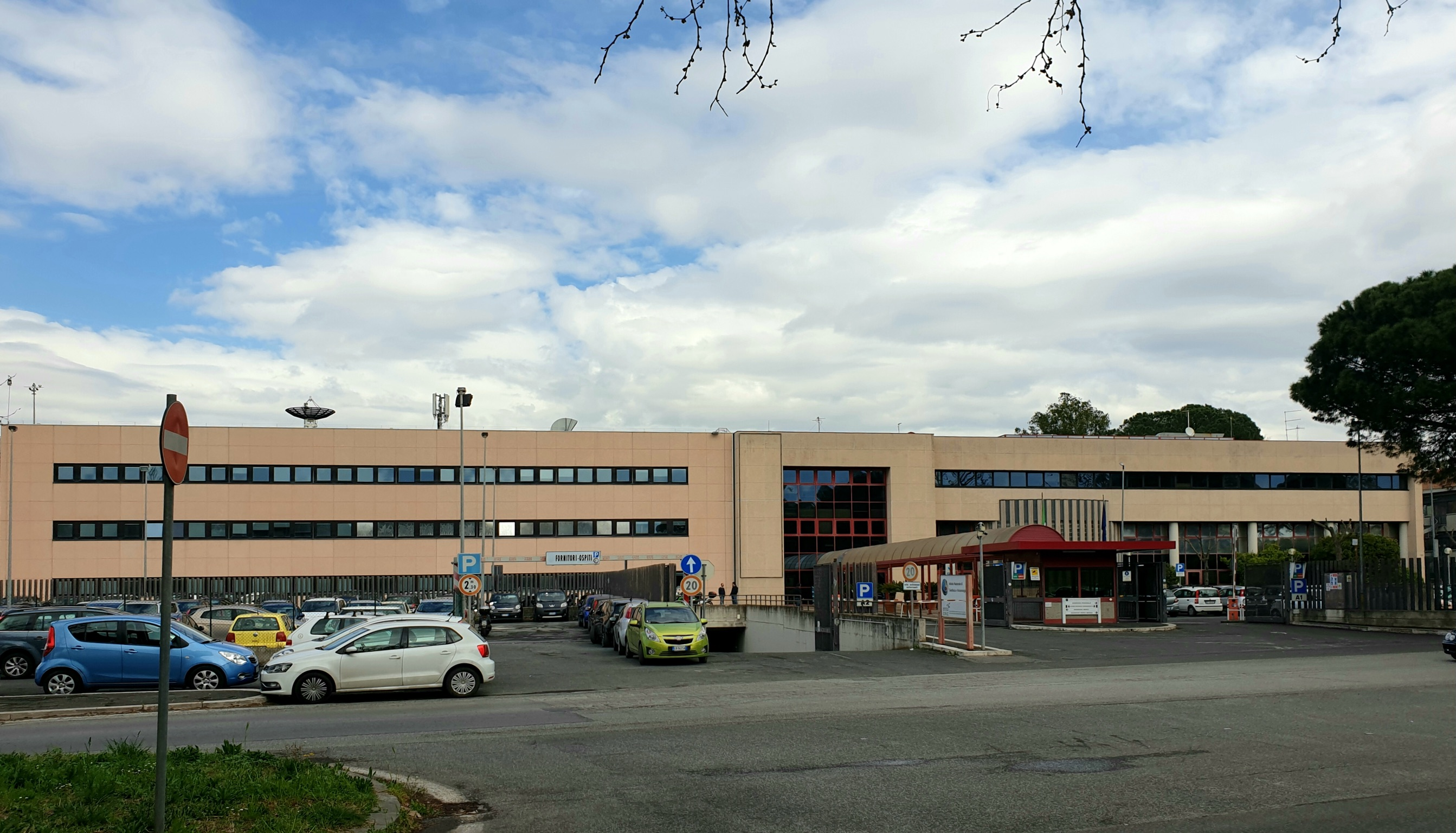
- Headquarters building in Rome

Agency overview
- Formed: 29 September 1999; 27 years ago
- Preceding agencies: Vesuvius Observatory; National Institute of Geophysics; International Institute of Volcanology; Institute of Fluid Geochemistry; Seismic Risk Research Institute
- Jurisdiction: Government of Italy
- Headquarters: Via di Vigna Murata 605, Rome, Italy; 41.828294826641816°N 12.515101960107794°E
- Employees: ~1000
- Agency executives: Fabio Florindo, President; Giovanni Torre, Director-General; Maria Fabrizia Buongiorno, Environment Department Director; Salvatore Stramondo, Earthquake Department Director; Stefano Felice Branca, Volcanoes Department Director; Lucia Margheriti, National Earthquake Observatory Director; Stefano Lorito, Tsunami Warning Center Coordinator; Lucia Pappalardo, Vesuvius Observatory Section Director
- Parent agency: Ministry of University and Research
- Child agency: Vesuvius Observatory (since 1999)
- Website: ingv.it

The National Institute of Geophysics and Volcanology (Italian: Istituto Nazionale di Geofisica e Vulcanologia, INGV) is a research institute for geophysics and volcanology in Italy.

INGV is funded by the Italian Ministry of Education, Universities and Research. Its main responsibilities within the Italian civil protection system are the maintenance and monitoring of the national networks for seismic and volcanic phenomena, together with outreach and educational activities for the Italian population. The institute employs around 2000 people distributed between the headquarters in Rome and the other sections in Milan, Bologna, Pisa, Naples, Catania and Palermo.

INGV is amongst the top 20 research institutions in terms of scientific publications production. It participates and coordinates several EU research projects and organizes international scientific meetings in collaboration with other institutions.

== Presidents ==
- 29 September 1999 – 11 August 2011: Enzo Boschi
- 12 August 2011 – 21 December 2011: Domenico Giardini
- 21 March 2012 – 27 April 2016 : Stefano Gresta (since 21 December 2011 acting president)
- 28 April 2016 – 26 March 2025: Carlo Doglioni.

Fabio Florindo was appointed president on 27 March 2025
