= Macedonio Melloni =

Italian physicist (1798–1854)

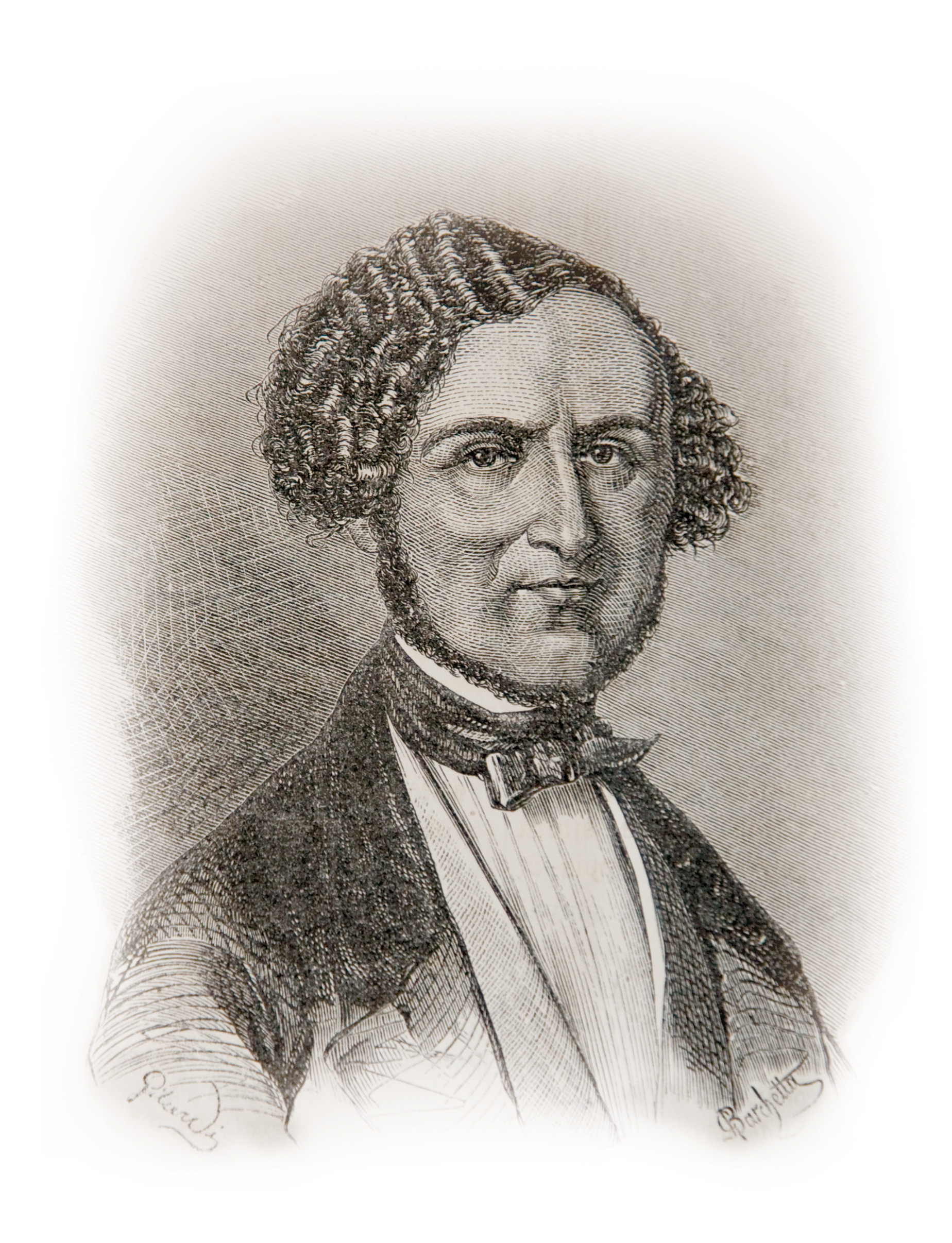
- Born: 11 April 1798; Parma
- Died: 11 August 1854 (aged 56); Portici
- Known for: Radiant heat
- Awards: Pour le Mérite (1842); ForMemRS (1839); Rumford Medal (1834)
- Scientific career
- Fields: Physics

Macedonio Melloni (11 April 1798 – 11 August 1854) was an Italian physicist, notable for demonstrating that radiant heat has similar physical properties to those of light. His works earned him the Rumford Medal and the nickname "Newton of heat".

== Life ==
He was born in Parma. In 1824, he was appointed professor at the local University but was compelled to escape to France after taking part in the revolution of 1831. In 1839, he went to Naples and was soon appointed director of the Vesuvius Observatory, a post that he held until 1848. In 1845, he was elected a foreign member of the Royal Swedish Academy of Sciences.

He died at Portici, near Naples, of cholera, aged 56.

== Work ==
Melloni's reputation as a physicist rests principally on his discoveries in radiant heat, made with the aid of the thermomultiplier, a combination of thermopile and galvanometer. In 1831, soon after the discovery of thermoelectricity by Thomas Johann Seebeck, he and Leopoldo Nobili employed the instrument in experiments especially concerned with characteristics of (in modern language) black-body radiation transmitted by various materials.

He used an optical bench fitted with thermopiles, shields and light and heat sources, such as Locatelli's lamp and Leslie's cube, in order to show that radiant heat could be reflected, refracted and polarised in the same way as light.

His most important book, La thermocrose ou la coloration calorifique (Vol. I., Naples, 1850), was unfinished at his death.

He also studied the magnetism of rocks, electrostatic induction and photography.

== Honours ==
- Rumford Medal of the Royal Society (1834);
- Correspondent of the Académie des Sciences (1835);
- Foreign member of the Royal Society (1839).

== See also ==
- Thermographic camera
- Vesuvius Observatory
