= Diatribe de Progidiosis Crucibus =

1661 work by the Jesuit scholar Athanasius Kircher

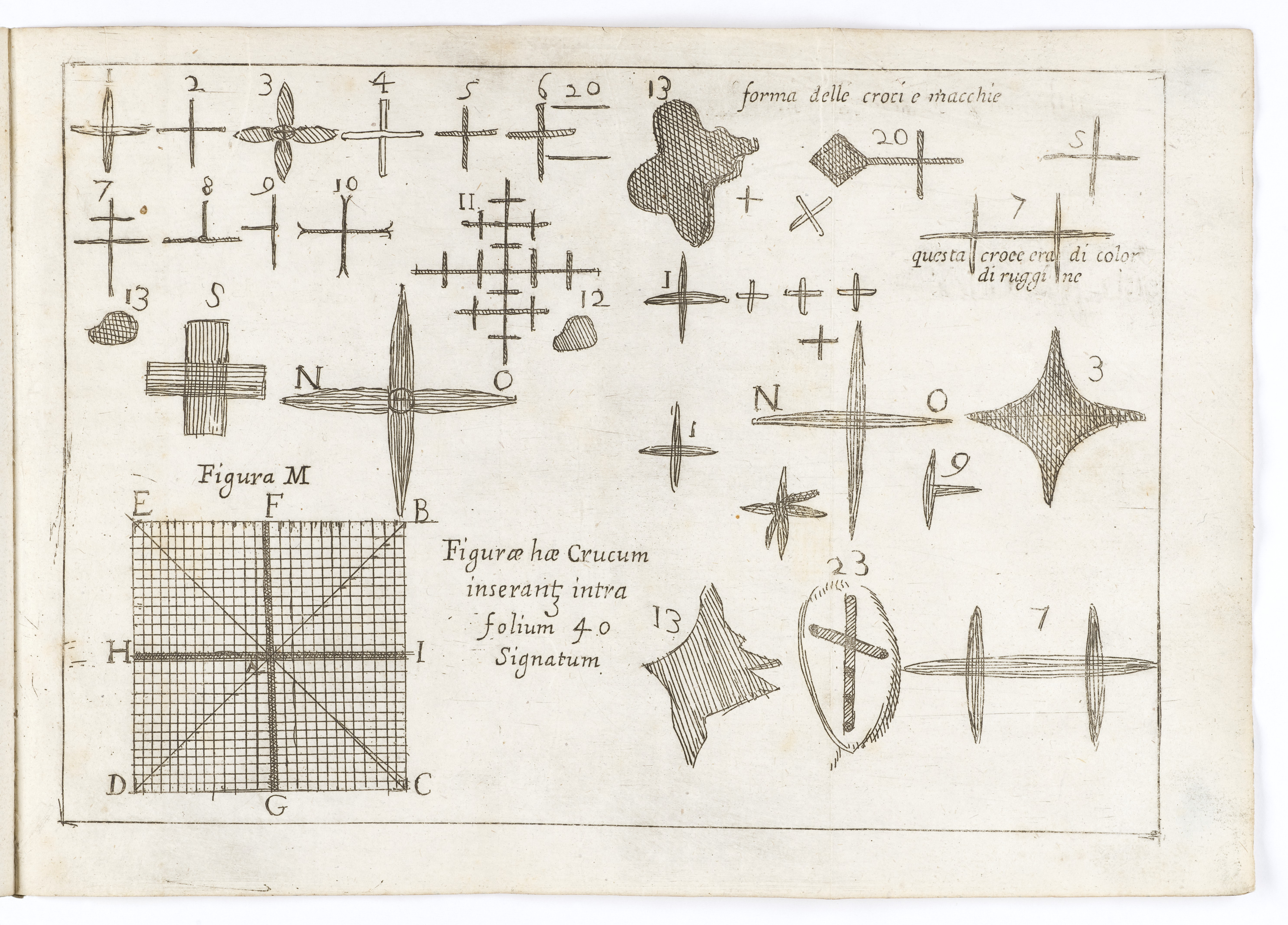
Kircher's sketches of the crosses he observed, reproduced in Diatribe

Diatribe de progidiosis crucibus is a 1661 work by the Jesuit scholar Athanasius Kircher. It was printed in Rome by Blasius Deversin and dedicated to Archduke Leopold Wilhelm of Austria. A second edition of the work was published in Rome in 1666 and a German translation appeared in Gaspar Schott's Joco-seriorum naturae et artis (Würzburg, 1666).

Diatribe is Kircher's most succinct and explicit statement in favour of seeking rational causes for phenomena through an understanding of natural laws, derived from observation, rather than seeking miraculous explanations. This continued the theme he had taken up in Scrutinium Physico-Medicum (1658) and pursued in greater detail in Mundus Subterraneus (1665).

During an 1660 eruption of Vesuvius, small cross-shaped objects fell from the sky. They were seen as a message from the patron saint Saint Gennaro by the superstitious population of Naples. Kircher visited the volcano to investigate the phenomenon, and concluded that fine ash and moisture had settled on cloth, taking a cruciform shape defined by the weave itself. Kircher noted that the crosses had been seen on linen cloth but not on garments of wool, and that they had appeared only under certain specific conditions of temperature and moisture, causing "guttulae nitrosae" (nitrous drops) to form on the surface. The book covers his conclusions.

== Background ==
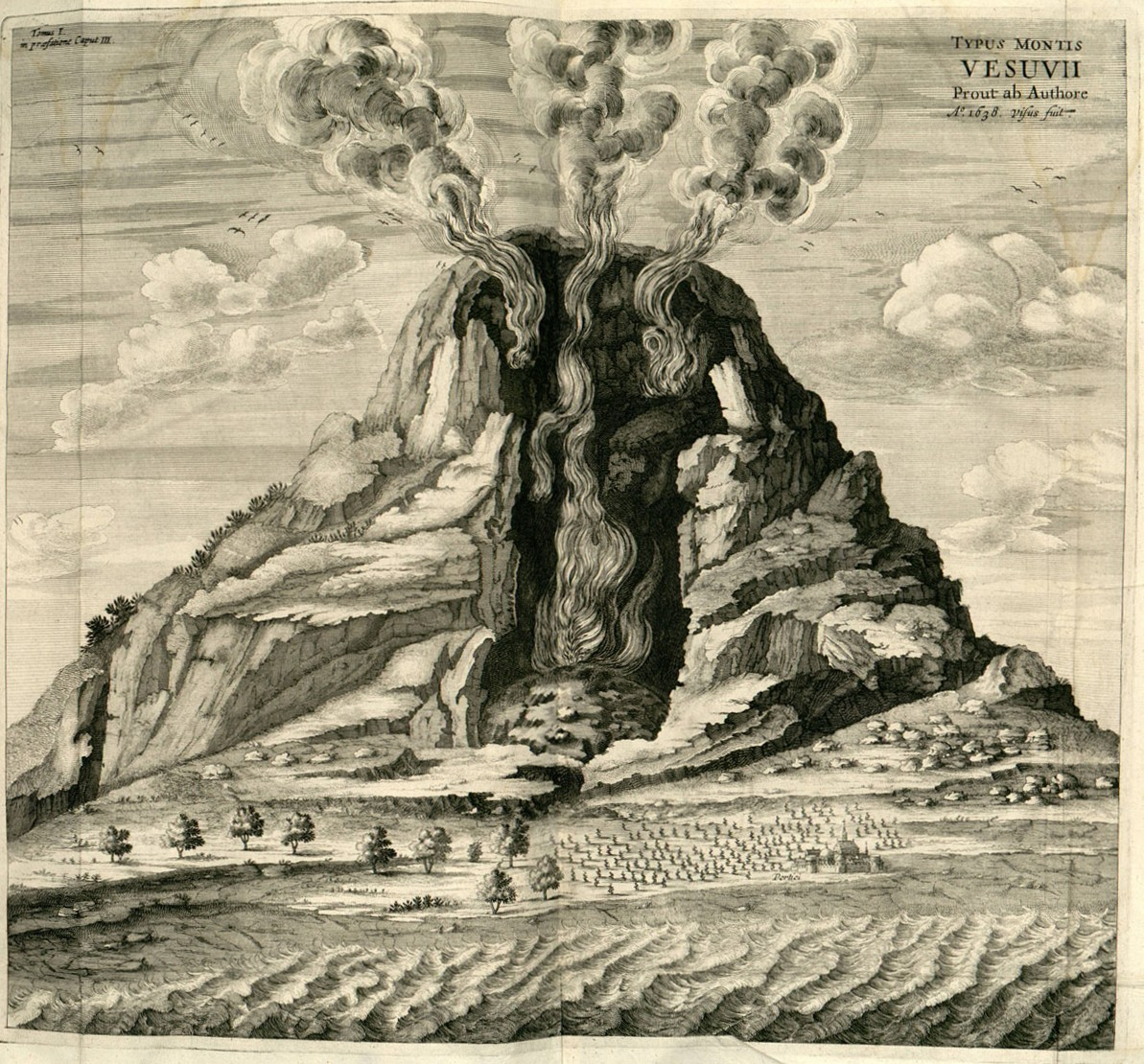
Kircher's illustration of Vesuvius from "Mundus Subterraneus"

On 3 July 1660 an eruption of Vesuvius began. A plume of ejected material rose up to 4 km (2.5 mi) into the air and was carried off to the southeast by the wind. As was normal for Vesuvius, the late stages of the eruption involved the ejection of white ash. Along with this ash, free twinned augite phenocrysts were ejected, causing small cross-shaped objects to fall from the sky. This phenomenon appeared on the day the Sun entered Leo (21 July).

The population of Naples believed at first that these crosses were a sign from their patron saint, Saint Gennaro, that he would protect them from the volcano. However many people in Southern Italy soon grew fearful that the crosses were a token of God's anger.

Kircher wanted to undertake an investigation of the phenomenon that would reassure people and help avoid panic. He had an intense dislike of superstition and its simplistic view of the world, which led people to prefer the idea of the disruptive intervention of a miracle rather than seeking to understand the complex mechanisms by which the world and nature operated. He had a prior research interest in Vesusius, having had himself lowered into its crater for research purposes in 1638. Between August and October 1660, Kircher travelled to the hamlets of Somma and Ottaviano to look for primary evidence himself, and also read accounts from other witnesses in southern Italy. These reported various extraordinary discoveries, such as that the crosses had appeared on altar drapes, and on objects inside locked chests and shuttered rooms.

== Discussion and conclusions ==
The first two thirds of the work consists of a pars historica and a pars physica, setting out both a historic narrative of the phenomenon and a physical description. Three possible explanations for the mysterious crosses were considered. Firstly, they may have been miraculous and involved a direct intervention by God in the events of the world; secondly, angels or demons might have made use of natural forces in extraordinary ways; and thirdly, the laws of nature could provide a perfectly good explanation.

In Kircher's view the ultimate cause of all things was divine will, but this was expressed, for the most part, through understandable natural laws; studying these laws therefore revealed the forces that lay beneath natural phenomena. The explanation for the cross-shaped marks, he concluded, was that fine ash and moisture had settled on cloth, taking cruciform shape defined by the weave itself.

Kircher noted that the crosses had been seen on linen cloth but not on garments of wool, and that they had appeared only under certain specific conditions of temperature and moisture, causing "guttulae nitrosae" (nitrous drops) to form on the surface. To support his conclusion Kircher noted two instances of similar phenomena; when a tomcat had sprayed linen in the laundry room at the Jesuit College in Rome, the effect produced was yellow crosses following the weave of the cloth; the same had also been observed in the bed-linen of an elderly Jesuit who had accidentally wet his bed.

He maintained however that an explanation through the operation of natural laws did not mean that the phenomenon did not contain an important divine message:

"[Portents are] like hieroglyphic symbols swathed in enigmatic and allegorical meanings which the Divine Wisdom records in Heaven, Earth, and the elements as if in a hook and sets it before mortals to read; when they withdraw from the paths of Divine Will they are terrified by the threats held out before them, and turn back toward better fruits.

== Critical reception ==
Like all of Kircher's work, Diatribe had to be submitted to the censors of the Jesuit order before it could be published. They did not block it, but informed Kircher that this was not the quality of work the order was expecting its scholars to produce. They noted that crosses had been found on meat and fruit as well as linen. Furthermore, crosses were still continuing to appear, after the eruption had stopped and after the Sun had moved out of Leo. If they waited until the autumn rains washed the remaining ash out of the air, they would be able to see whether the conclusions of Diatribe still seemed satisfactory or not. They therefore recommended that publication should be delayed. Before publication in 1661, Kircher added a discussion about the appearance of crosses on fruit and meat, arguing that, like linen, these were fibrous materials capable of producing the same effect on their surfaces.

The work was widely disparaged, and in 1677, Gioseffo Petrucci published Prodromo apologetico alli studi chircheriani which sought to defend Kircher against those who thought his explanation of the phenomenon was too credulous.
