= Vesuvius Observatory =

Research center in Campania, Italy

Coordinates: 40°49′11″N 14°10′57″E

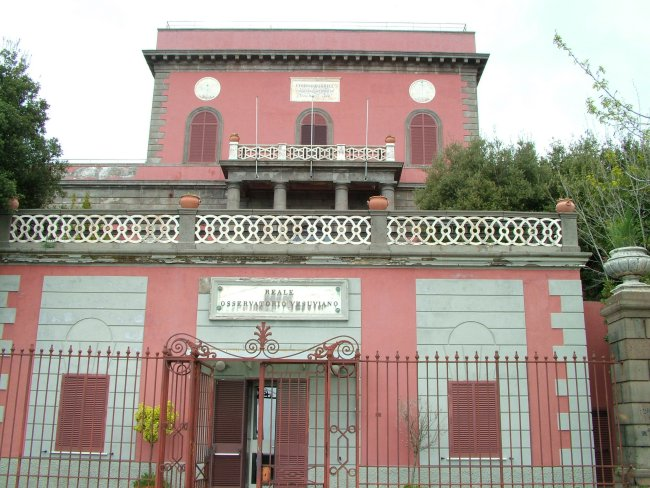
The 1841 building

The Vesuvius Observatory (Italian: Osservatorio Vesuviano) is the surveillance centre for monitoring the three volcanic areas of Campania, Italy: Mount Vesuvius, the Phlegraean Fields and Ischia. Founded in 1841 on the slopes of Mount Vesuvius by Ferdinand II of Bourbon, King of the Two Sicilies, it is the oldest volcanology institute in the world. Its current operative center is based in Naples, hosting an important section of the National Institute of Geophysics and Volcanology.

== History ==
=== Founding ===
Italian scientists Teodoro Monticelli and Nicola Covelli suggested that an observatory be set up near Mount Vesuvius to study its behavior. They noted that a detailed study of Mount Vesuvius’ volcanic activity and its connection to atmospheric trends required a continuous presence to study its effects.

=== Leadership ===
Macedonio Melloni, an Italian physicist was director of the Observatory from 1839 to 1849. He was born in Parma in 1798 and studied physics in Paris, where he attended the École Polytechnique. He later obtained a teaching position at the University of Parma. In 1830, he was banished from Parma after praising the actions of Parisian students during the recent insurrections. He subsequently worked in Geneva and Paris. In 1825, while still in Parma, he built an astatic magnetometer whose design he later used in Naples to investigate the magnetization of lava. Melloni later received the Rumford Medal at the Royal Society in London and continued to study latent heat in Paris, becoming close friends with English physicist Michael Faraday, French scientist François Arago, and German geologist Alexander von Humboldt.

As director, Melloni conducted research on whether volcanic and crystallic rocks obtained their magnetism from the way they cooled. The results of his research showed that the rocks maintained thermal magnetization. Melloni died during the 1854 cholera epidemic.

Upon Melloni's death, Luigi Palmieri, succeeded Melloni as director in 1855; during his tenure, he installed the scientific instruments that Melloni purchased at the museum, creating a meteorological tower and completing the buildout of the observatory in 1856. Prior to becoming director, Palmieri conducting research at the observatory.

Palmieri also created the first electromagnetic seismograph which provided the first step towards the collection of continuous data on Mount Vesuvius’ volcanic activity. His machine was able to resolve the amplitude of the seismic activity. He also advocated for continuous monitoring of the Phlegraean Fields area in Caldera, Italy. He was also appointed full professor of Geophysics in 1860, the year of Italian unification.

=== Current status ===
The museum is developed on Colle del Salvatore and consists of 2 buildings initially built in 1841, and a modern structure built during the 1970s for monitoring activities during the time.

There exist two large sundials that indicate solar time and the months of the year in the Vesuvius Observatory complex. Currently on display in the museum are seismographs by Luigi Palmieri, Ascanio Filomarino, Emil Wiechert, Guido Alfani and Giovanni Agamennone.

The Observatory in Naples continues to host the study of Mount Vesuvius and other volcanoes in the nearby region of the Phlegraean Fields and Island of Ischia. Scientists working at the observatory work on pursuing their own ideas on improving the volcanic detector instrumentation.

== Major scientific contributions ==
=== 1856 – Electromagnetic seismograph ===
As director, Luigi Palmieri developed an electromagnetic seismograph that recorded seismic signals on paper.

=== 1856–1896 – Early volcanic surveillance ===
Palmieri established a scientific surveillance network using instruments he designed. His observations of harmonic tremor caused by magma degassing demonstrated a relationship between seismic activity and volcanism.

=== 1906 – Documentation of the Vesuvius eruption ===
Raffaele Vittorio Matteucci observed and documented the 1906 eruption of Mount Vesuvius, with contributions from American inventor and engineer Frank Alvord Perret.

=== 1913 – Multidisciplinary monitoring system ===
Giuseppe Mercalli, assisted by Alessandro Malladra, developed a volcanic surveillance program combining instrumental observations, a seismic surveillance network, and systematic field measurements. The program became operational in May 1913.

=== 1944 – Eruption forecasting ===
Giuseppe Imbò anticipated the beginning of Mount Vesuvius's 1944 eruption using a seismograph and direct observations.

== Research operations and institutional standing ==
=== Seismic activity monitoring ===
The observatory uses a network of seismic stations around Vesuvius, The Phlegraean Fields, and Ischia to detect real-time ground movement such as earthquakes and volcanic tremors.

=== Ground deformation monitoring ===
GPS and tiltmeters are used to measure ground movement and deformation which may indicate changes in underground volcanic activity.

=== Gravimetric monitoring ===
Measures of the acceleration of gravity are used to identify potential shifts in underground masses in the subsurface.

=== Geochemical monitoring ===
The networks analyze the chemical composition of volcanic gases, fumaroles, soil emissions, and groundwater to indicate increased volcanic activity.

=== Institutional standing ===
The Vesuvius Observatory became the Naples division of the National Institute of Geophysics and Volcanology (INGV) in 2001. INGV is a public research institution primarily overseen and funded by Italy’s Ministry of University and Research.

INGV also receives support and funding from Italy’s Civil Protection Department for providing scientific information on volcanic risk assessment, emergency preparation and disaster prevention.

== Museum ==
The historic Vesuvius Observatory building has been preserved as a museum on Colle del Salvatore within Vesuvius National Park, maintaining its historical and scientific significance. The museum complex includes the original building constructed between 1841 and 1847, a modern structure built in the 1970s for monitoring activities, a guest house, and an adjoining garden. The observatory complex also features two large sundials that indicate solar time and the months of the year.

The museum includes collections of scientific instruments, volcanic rocks and minerals, fine art, books, and various media such as photographs and films. There are two rooms within the museum that demonstrate how people have been affected by eruptions from A.D. 79 and 1944. The museum includes a library of volcanological books from the 16th century to the 18th century, including Athanasius Kircher's Mundus Subterraneus from 1668. Art displayed at the museum includes medallions made from molten lava and various gouaches depicting Mount Vesuvius. The museum displays historical seismographs designed by Luigi Palmieri, Ascanio Filomarino, Emil Johann Wiechert, Guido Alfani, and Giovanni Agamennone.

The museum also serves an educational purpose through multimedia exhibitions, interactive reconstructions of volcanic eruptions, and displays explaining volcanic hazards. As part of the National Institute of Geophysics and Volcanology (INGV), the observatory maintains connections with scientific research and volcanic monitoring activities, contributing to public awareness of volcanic risks.
