= Volcanology =

Study of volcanoes

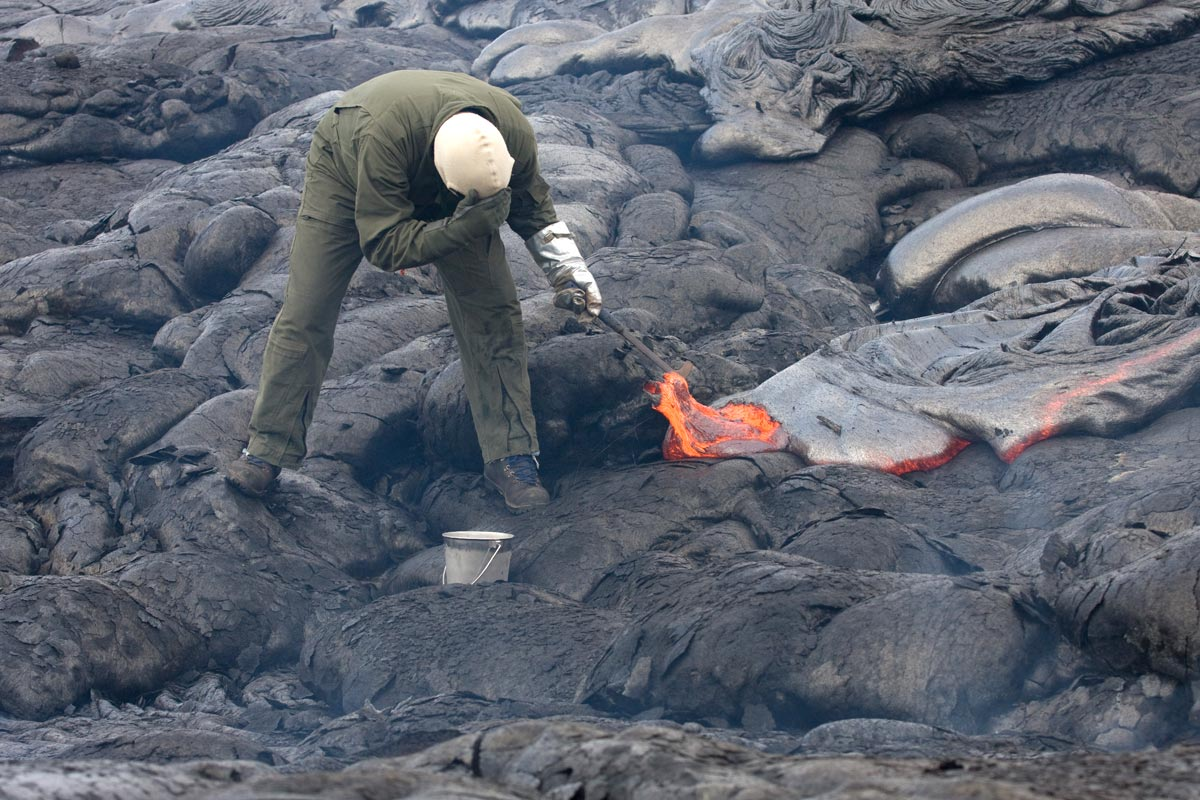
A volcanologist sampling lava using a rock hammer and a bucket of water

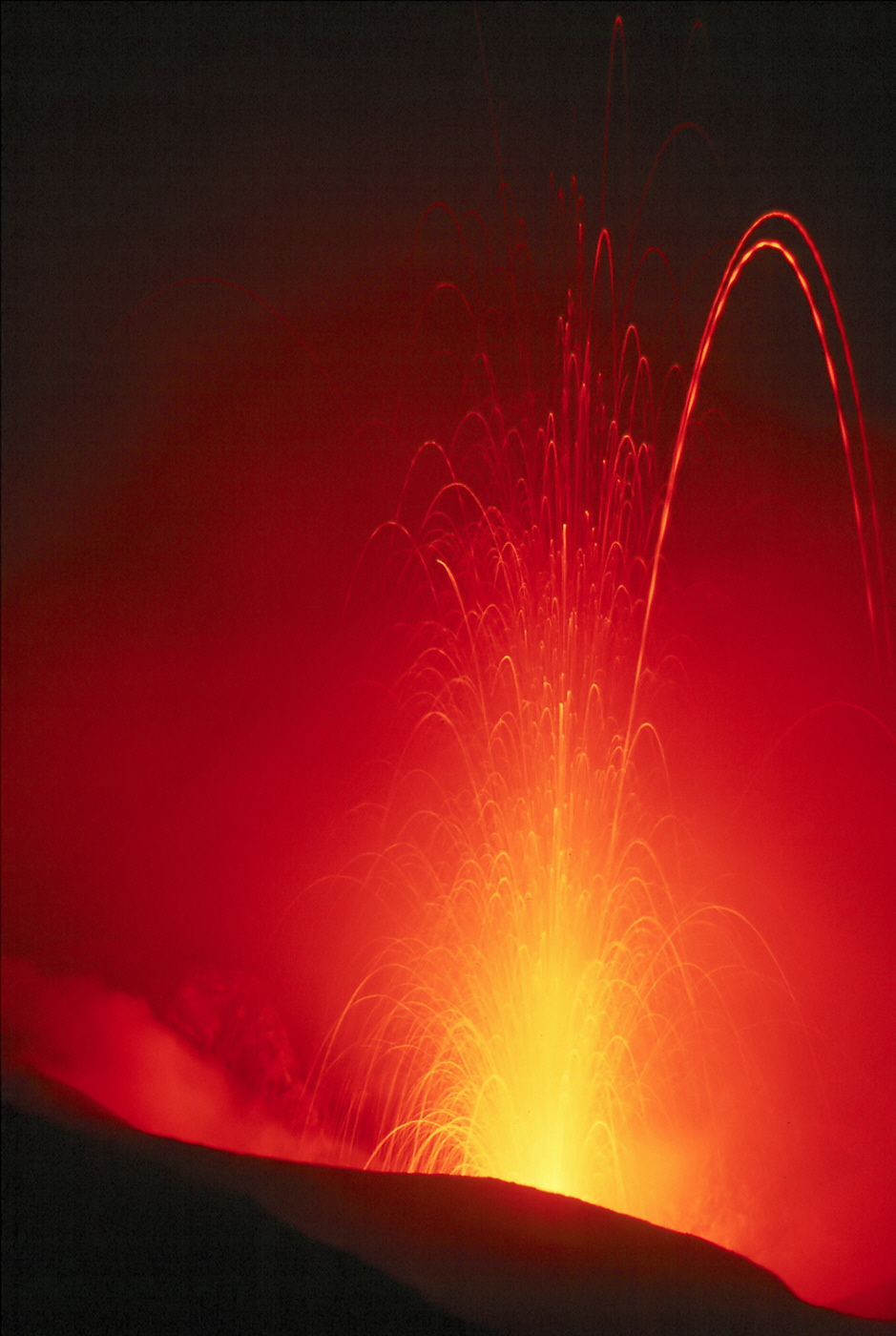
Eruption of Stromboli (Italy), approximately 100 m (300 ft) vertically. Exposure of several seconds. The dashed trajectories are the result of lava pieces with a bright hot side and a cool dark side rotating in mid-air.

Volcanology (also spelled vulcanology) is the study of volcanoes, lava, magma, and related geological, geophysical and geochemical phenomena (volcanism). The term volcanology is derived from the Latin word vulcan. Vulcan was the ancient Roman god of fire.

A volcanologist is a geologist who studies the eruptive activity and formation of volcanoes and their current and historic eruptions. Volcanologists frequently visit volcanoes, especially active ones, to observe volcanic eruptions, collect eruptive products including tephra (such as ash or pumice), rock and lava samples. One major focus of enquiry is the prediction of eruptions; there is currently no accurate way to do this, but predicting or forecasting eruptions, like predicting earthquakes, could save many lives.

== Modern volcanology ==
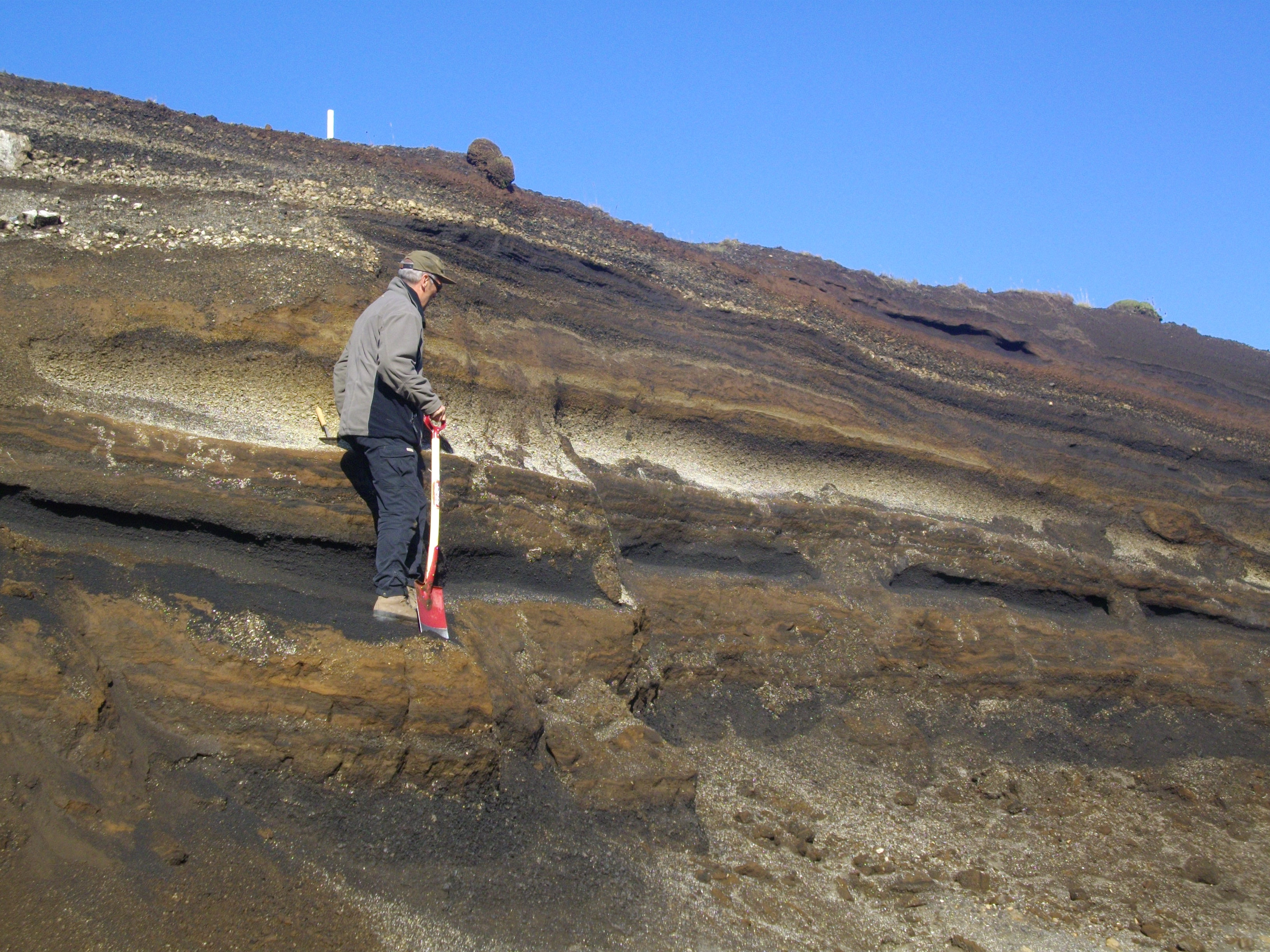
Volcanologist examining tephra horizons in south-central Iceland.

A diagram of a destructive plate margin, where subduction fuels volcanic activity

In 1841, the first volcanological observatory, the Vesuvius Observatory, was founded in the Kingdom of the Two Sicilies. Volcanology advances have required more than just structured observation, and the science relies upon the understanding and integration of knowledge in many fields including geology, tectonics, physics, chemistry and mathematics, with many advances only being able to occur after the advance had occurred in another field of science. For example, the study of radioactivity only commenced in 1896, and its application to the theory of plate tectonics and radiometric dating took about 50 years after this. Many other developments in fluid dynamics, experimental physics and chemistry, techniques of mathematical modelling, instrumentation and in other sciences have been applied to volcanology since 1841.

=== Techniques ===
Seismic observations are made using seismographs deployed near volcanic areas, watching out for increased seismicity during volcanic events, in particular looking for long-period harmonic tremors, which signal magma movement through volcanic conduits.

Surface deformation monitoring includes the use of geodetic techniques such as leveling, tilt, strain, angle and distance measurements through tiltmeters, total stations and EDMs. This also includes GNSS observations and InSAR. Surface deformation indicates magma upwelling: increased magma supply produces bulges in the volcanic center's surface.

Gas emissions may be monitored with equipment including portable ultra-violet spectrometers (COSPEC, now superseded by the miniDOAS), which analyzes the presence of volcanic gases such as sulfur dioxide; or by infra-red spectroscopy (FTIR). Increased gas emissions, and more particularly changes in gas compositions, may signal an impending volcanic eruption.

Temperature changes are monitored using thermometers and observing changes in thermal properties of volcanic lakes and vents, which may indicate upcoming activity.

Satellites are widely used to monitor volcanoes, as they allow a large area to be monitored easily. They can measure the spread of an ash plume, such as the one from Eyjafjallajökull's 2010 eruption, as well as SO_{2} emissions. InSAR and thermal imaging can monitor large, scarcely populated areas where it would be too expensive to maintain instruments on the ground.

Other geophysical techniques (electrical, gravity and magnetic observations) include monitoring fluctuations and sudden change in resistivity, gravity anomalies or magnetic anomaly patterns that may indicate volcano-induced faulting and magma upwelling.

Stratigraphic analyses includes analyzing tephra and lava deposits and dating these to give volcano eruption patterns, with estimated cycles of intense activity and size of eruptions.

Compositional analysis has been very successful in the grouping of volcanoes by type, origin of magma, including matching of volcanoes to a mantle plume of a particular hotspot, mantle plume melting depths, the history of recycled subducted crust, matching of tephra deposits to each other and to volcanoes of origin, and the understanding the formation and evolution of magma reservoirs, an approach which has now been validated by real-time sampling.

=== Forecasting ===
Some of the techniques mentioned above, combined with modelling, have proved useful and successful in the forecasting of some eruptions, such as the evacuation of the locality around Mount Pinatubo in 1991 that may have saved 20,000 lives. Short-term forecasts tend to use seismic or multiple monitoring data with long-term forecasting involving the study of the previous history of local volcanism. However, eruption forecasting does not just involve predicting the next initial onset time of an eruption, as it might also address the size of a future eruption, and evolution of an eruption once it has begun.

== History ==
Volcanology has an extensive history. The earliest known recording of a volcanic eruption may be on a wall painting dated to about 7,000 BCE found at the Neolithic site at Çatal Höyük in Anatolia, Turkey. This painting has been interpreted as a depiction of an erupting volcano, with a cluster of houses below shows a twin peaked volcano in eruption, with a town at its base (though archaeologists now question this interpretation). The volcano may be either Hasan Dağ, or its smaller neighbour, Melendiz Dağ.

=== Ancient mythology ===
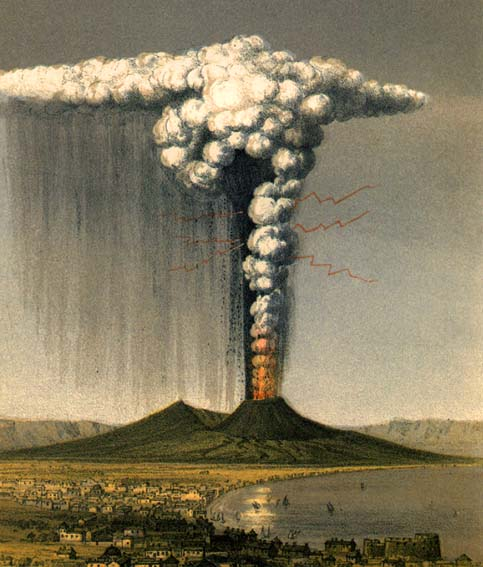
Eruption of Vesuvius in 1822. The eruption of CE 79 would have appeared very similar.

The classical world of Greece and the early Roman Empire explained volcanoes as sites of various gods. Ancient myths held that the giant Enceladus was buried beneath Etna by the goddess Athena as punishment for rebellion against the gods. Roman poet Virgil, in the Aeneid, associated the mountain's rumblings with the tormented cries of Enceladus, the flames his breath and the tremors his railing against the bars of his prison. Euripides considered that Hephaestus, the god of fire, sat below the volcano Etna, forging the weapons of Zeus. Aeschylus considered Etna as the place where Typhon, who battled Zeus in the Titanomachy, was imprisoned. Diodorus Siculus when discussing the eruption of Etna of 425 BCE, associated the event with the abduction of Persephone.

=== Greco-Roman philosophy ===
The Greek philosopher Empedocles (c. 490-430 BCE) saw the world divided into the four classical elements: earth, air, fire and water. Plato contended that channels of hot and cold waters flow through subterranean rivers. In the depths of the earth, a vast river of fire, the Pyriphlegethon, would feed all the world's volcanoes. In Meteorology, Aristotle considered Earth as a living creature with convulsins and spasms. He considered underground fire as the result of "the...friction of the wind when it plunges into narrow passages."

Wind played a key role in volcano explanations until the 16th century after Anaxagoras, in the fifth century BC, had proposed eruptions were caused by a great wind. Lucretius, a Roman philosopher, claimed Etna was completely hollow and the fires of the underground driven by a fierce wind circulating near sea level. Ovid believed that the flame was fed from "fatty foods" and eruptions stopped when the food ran out. Vitruvius contended that sulfur, alum and bitumen fed the deep fires. Observations by Pliny the Elder noted the presence of earthquakes preceded an eruption; he died in the eruption of Vesuvius in 79 CE while investigating it at Stabiae. His nephew, Pliny the Younger, gave detailed descriptions of the eruption in which his uncle died, attributing his death to the effects of toxic gases. Such eruptions have been named Plinian in honour of the two authors.

=== Middle Ages ===
Thirteenth century Dominican scholar Restoro d'Arezzo devoted two entire chapters (11.6.4.6 and 11.6.4.7) of his seminal treatise La composizione del mondo colle sue cascioni to the origin of the endogenous energy of the Earth. Restoro maintained that the interior of the Earth was very hot and insisted, following Empedocles, that the Earth had a molten center and that volcanoes erupted through the rise of molten rock to the surface.

=== Renaissance observations ===
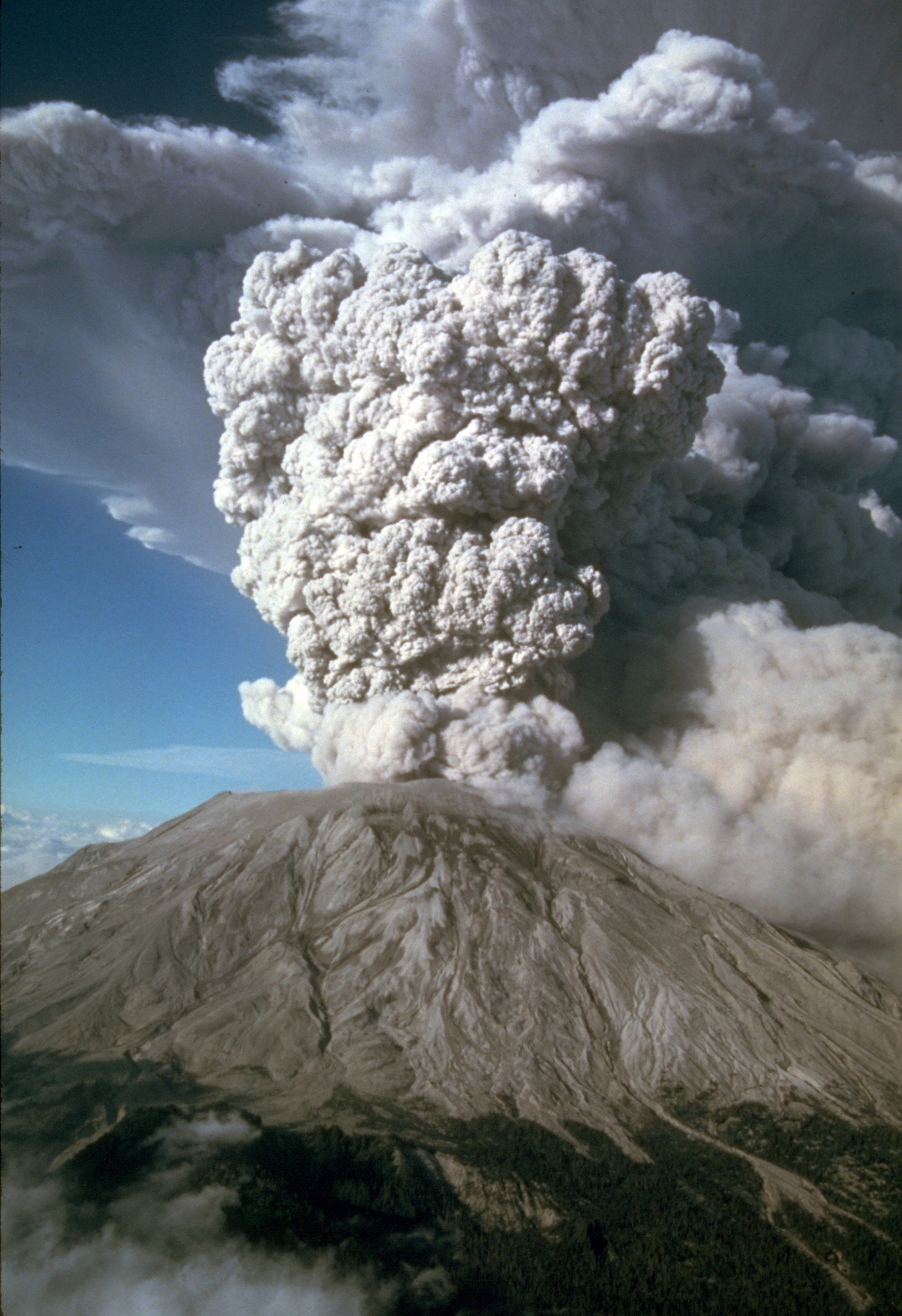
After the first eruption of Mount St. Helens on May 18, five more explosive eruptions occurred in 1980, including this event on July 22. This eruption sent pumice and ash 6 to 11 miles (10-18 kilometers) into the air, and was visible in Seattle, Washington, 100 miles (160 kilometers) to the north. The view here is from the south.

During the Renaissance, observers as Bernard Palissy, Conrad Gessner, and Johannes Kentmann (1518–1568) showed a deep intense interest in the nature, behavior, origin and history of the terrestrial globe. Many theories of volcanic action were framed during the late sixteenth mid-seventeenth centuries. Georgius Agricola argued the rays of the sun, as later proposed by Descartes had nothing to do with volcanoes. Agricola believed vapor under pressure caused eruptions of 'mountain oil' and basalt. Johannes Kepler considered volcanoes as conduits for the tears and excrement of the Earth, voiding bitumen, tar and sulfur. Descartes, pronouncing that God had created the Earth in an instant, declared he had done so in three layers; the fiery depths, a layer of water, and the air. Volcanoes, he said, were formed where the rays of the sun pierced the earth.

The volcanoes of southern Italy attracted naturalists ever since the Renaissance led to the rediscovery of Classical descriptions of them by wtiters like Lucretius and Strabo. Vesuvius, Stromboli and Vulcano provided an opportunity to study the nature of volcanic phenomena. Italian natural philosophers living within reach of these volcanoes wrote long and learned books on the subject: Giovanni Alfonso Borelli's account of the eruption of Mount Etna in 1669 became a standard source of information, as did Giulio Cesare Recupito's account of the 1631 eruption of Mount Vesuvius (1632 and later editions) and Francesco Serao's account of the eruption of Vesuvius in 1737 (1737, with editions in French and English).

The Jesuit Athanasius Kircher (1602–1680) witnessed eruptions of Mount Etna and Stromboli, then visited the crater of Vesuvius and published his view of an Earth with a central fire connected to numerous others caused by the burning of sulfur, bitumen and coal. He published his view of this in Mundus Subterraneus with volcanoes acting as a type of safety valve.

The causes of these phenomena were discussed in the large number of theories of the Earth that were published in the hundred years after 1650. The authors of these theories were not themselves observers, but combined the observations of others with Newtonian, Cartesian, Biblical or animistic science to produce a variety of all-embracing systems. Volcanic eruptions and earthquakes were generally linked in these systems to the existence of great open caverns under the Earth where inflammable vapours could accumulate until they were ignited. According to Thomas Burnet, much of the Earth itself was inflammable, with pitch, coal and brimstone all ready to burn. In William Whiston's theory the presence of underground air was necessary if ignition were to take place, while John Woodward stressed that water was essential. Athanasius Kircher maintained that the caverns and sources of the heat were deep, and reached down towards the centre of the Earth, while other writers, notably Georges Buffon, believed they were relatively superficial, and that volcanic fires were seated well up within the volcanic cone itself. A number of writers, most notably Thomas Robinson, believed that the Earth was an animal, and that its internal heat, earthquakes and eruptions were all signs of life. This animistic philosophy was waning by the end of the seventeenth century, but traces continued well into the eighteenth. Science wrestled with the ideas of the combustion of pyrite with water, that rock was solidified bitumen, and with notions of rock being formed from water (Neptunism). Of the volcanoes then known, all were near the water, hence the action of the sea upon the land was used to explain volcanism.

=== Interaction with religion and mythology ===
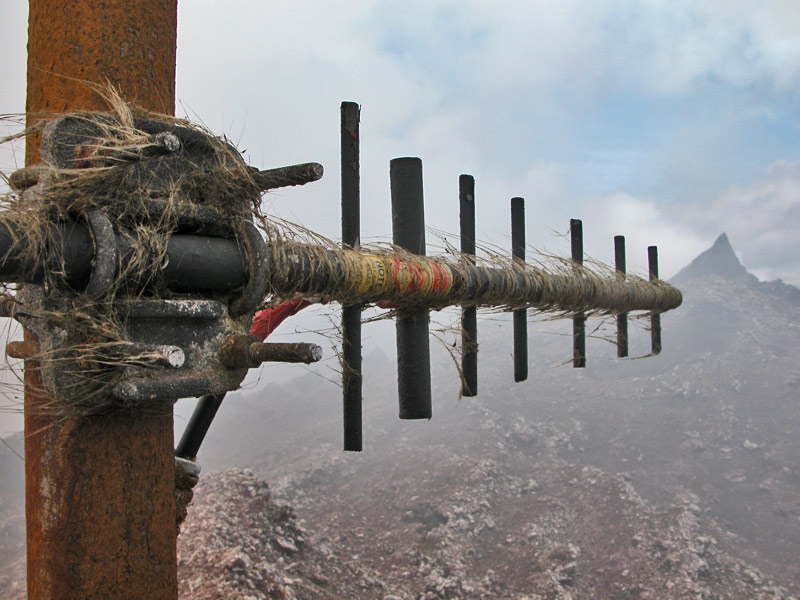
Pele's hair caught on a radio antenna mounted on the south rim of Puʻu ʻŌʻō, Hawaiʻi, July 22, 2005

Tribal legends of volcanoes abound from the Pacific Ring of Fire and the Americas, usually invoking the forces of the supernatural or the divine to explain the violent outbursts of volcanoes. Taranaki and Tongariro, according to Māori mythology, were lovers who fell in love with Pihanga, and a spiteful jealous fight ensued. Some Māori will not to this day live on the direct line between Tongariro and Taranaki for fear of the dispute flaring up again. In the Hawaiian religion, Pele (/ˈpeɪleɪ/ Pel-a; [ˈpɛlɛ]) is the goddess of volcanoes and a popular figure in Hawaiian mythology. Pele was used for various scientific terms as for Pele's hair, Pele's tears, and Limu o Pele (Pele's seaweed). A volcano on the Jovian moon Io is also named Pele.

Saint Agatha is patron saint of Catania, close to mount Etna, and an important highly venerated (till today) example of virgin martyrs of Christian antiquity. In 253 CE, one year after her violent death, the stilling of an eruption of Mt. Etna was attributed to her intercession. Catania was however nearly completely destroyed by the eruption of Mt. Etna in 1169, and over 15,000 of its inhabitants died. Nevertheless, the saint was invoked again for the 1669 Etna eruption and, for an outbreak that was endangering the town of Nicolosi in 1886. The way the saint is invoked and dealt with in Italian folk religion, in a quid pro quo manner, or bargaining approach which is sometimes used in prayerful interactions with saints, has been related (in the tradition of James Frazer) to earlier pagan beliefs and practices.

In 1660 the eruption of Vesuvius rained twinned pyroxene crystals and ash upon the nearby villages. The crystals resembled the crucifix and this was interpreted as the work of Saint Januarius. In Naples, the relics of St Januarius are paraded through town at every major eruption of Vesuvius. The register of these processions and the 1779 and 1794 diary of Father Antonio Piaggio allowed British diplomat and amateur naturalist Sir William Hamilton to provide a detailed chronology and description of Vesuvius' eruptions.

== Notable volcanologists ==
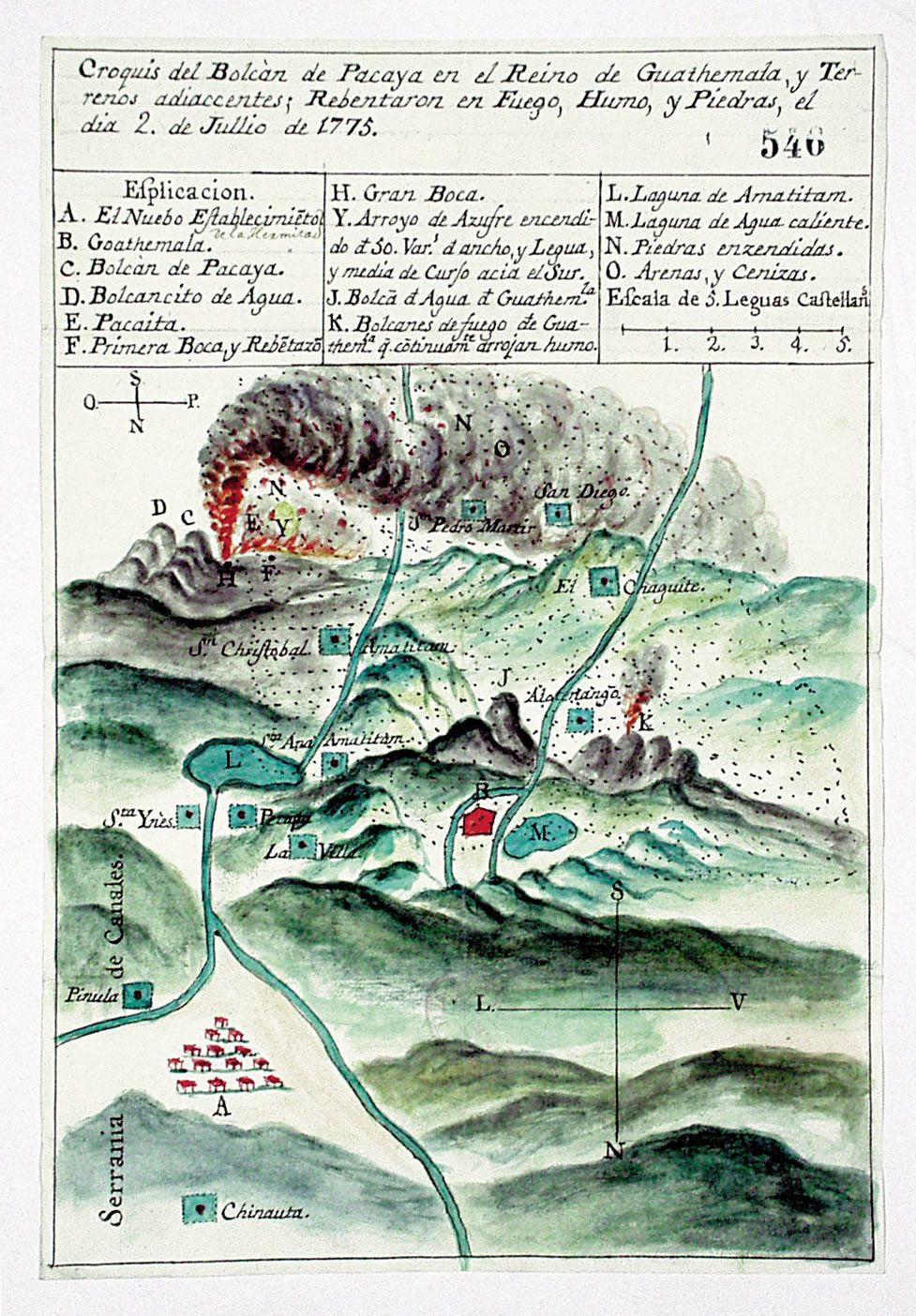
Spanish depiction of a volcanic eruption in Guatemala, 1775.

- Plato (428–348 BC)
- Pliny the Elder (23–79 AD)
- Pliny the Younger (61 – c. 113 AD)
- George-Louis Leclerc, Comte de Buffon (1707–1788)
- James Hutton (1726–1797)
- Déodat Gratet de Dolomieu (1750–1801)
- George Julius Poulett Scrope (1797–1876)
- Giuseppe Mercalli (1850–1914)
- Thomas Jaggar (1871–1953), founder of the Hawaiian Volcano Observatory
- Haroun Tazieff (1914–1998), advisor to the French Government and Jacques Cousteau
- George P. L. Walker (1926–2005), pioneering volcanologist who transformed the subject into a quantitative science
- Haraldur Sigurdsson (born 1939), Icelandic volcanologist and geochemist
- Katia and Maurice Krafft (1942–1991 and 1946–1991, respectively), died at Mount Unzen in Japan, 1991
- David A. Johnston (1949–1980), killed during the 1980 eruption of Mount St. Helens
- Harry Glicken (1958–1991), died at Mount Unzen in Japan, 1991

== Gallery ==
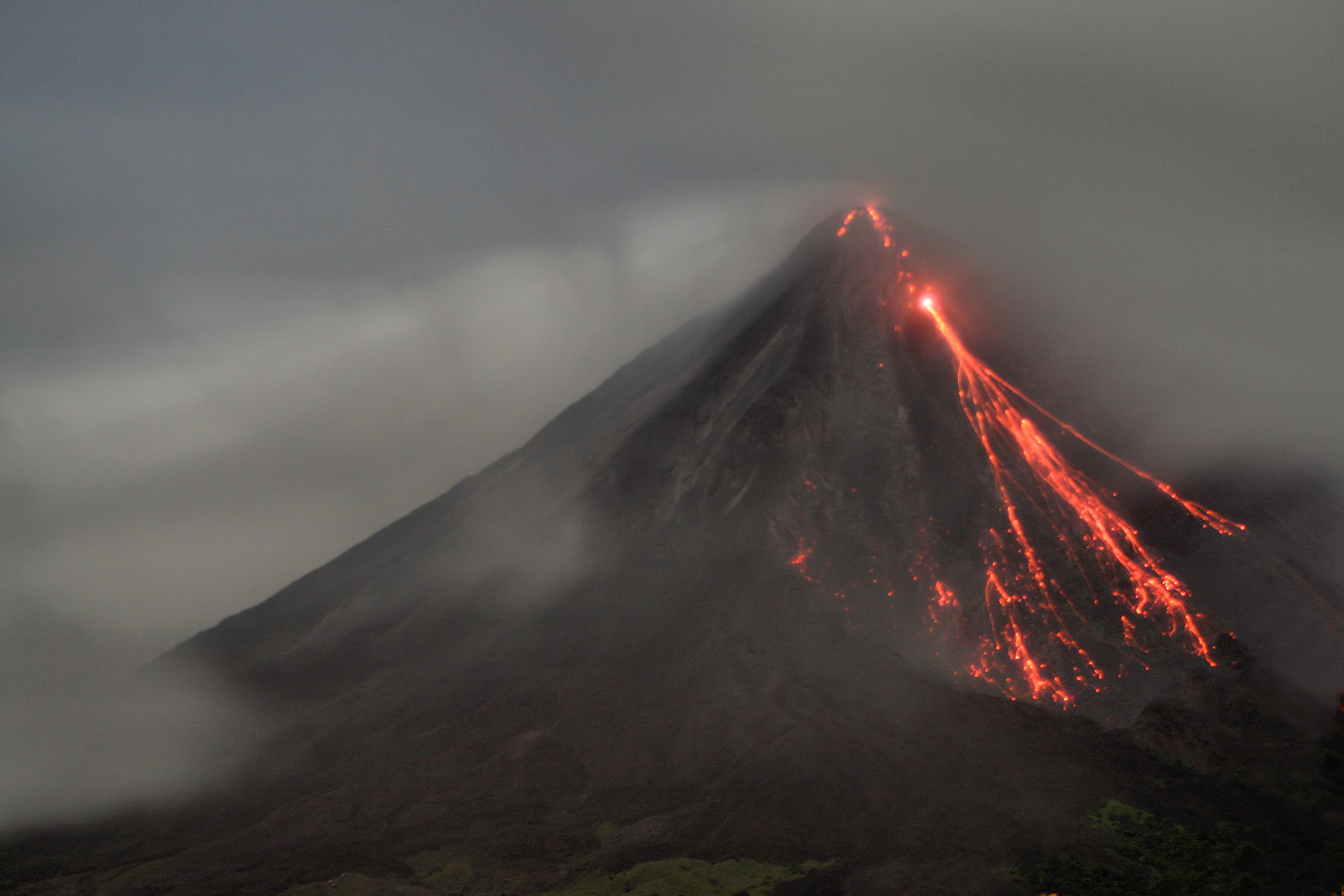
Arenal Volcano, Costa Rica at night

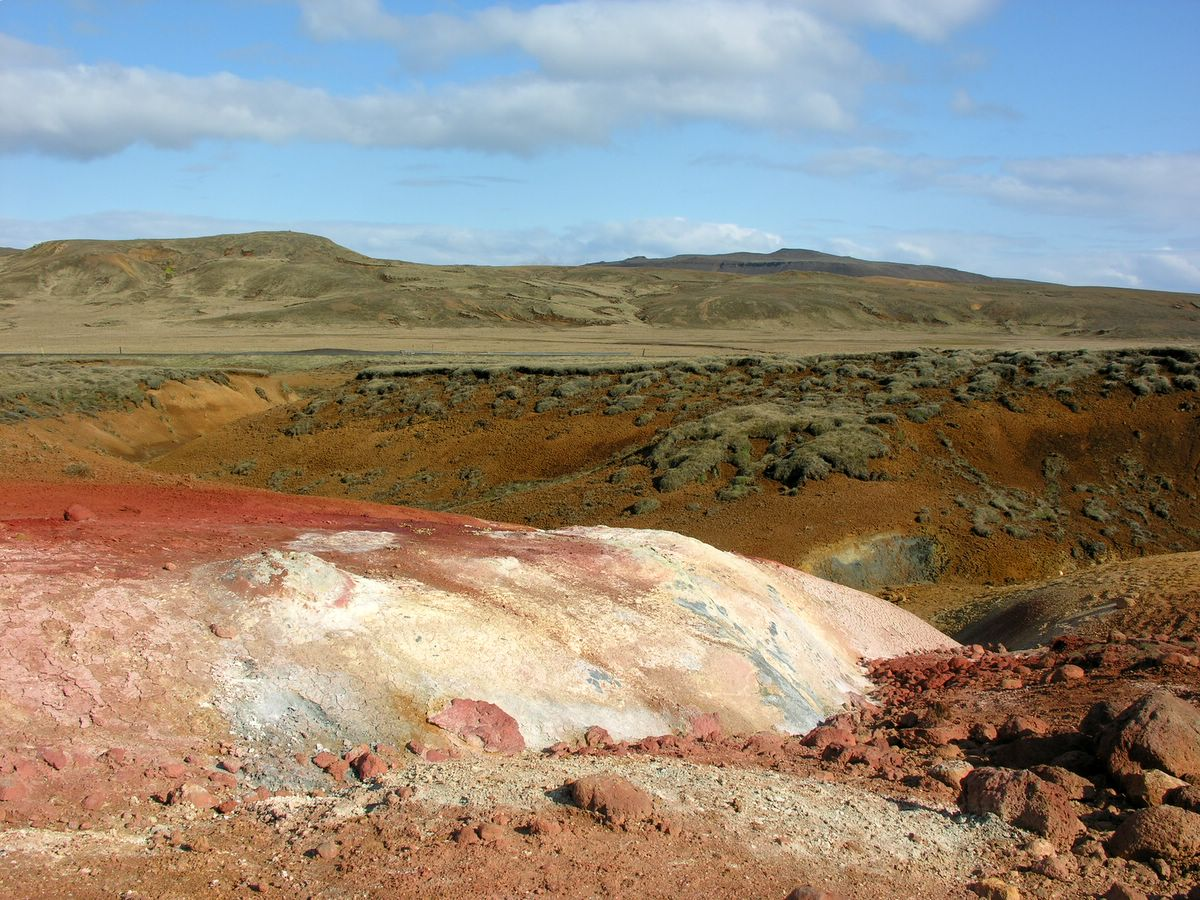
Krýsuvík, a thermal area in southwest Iceland

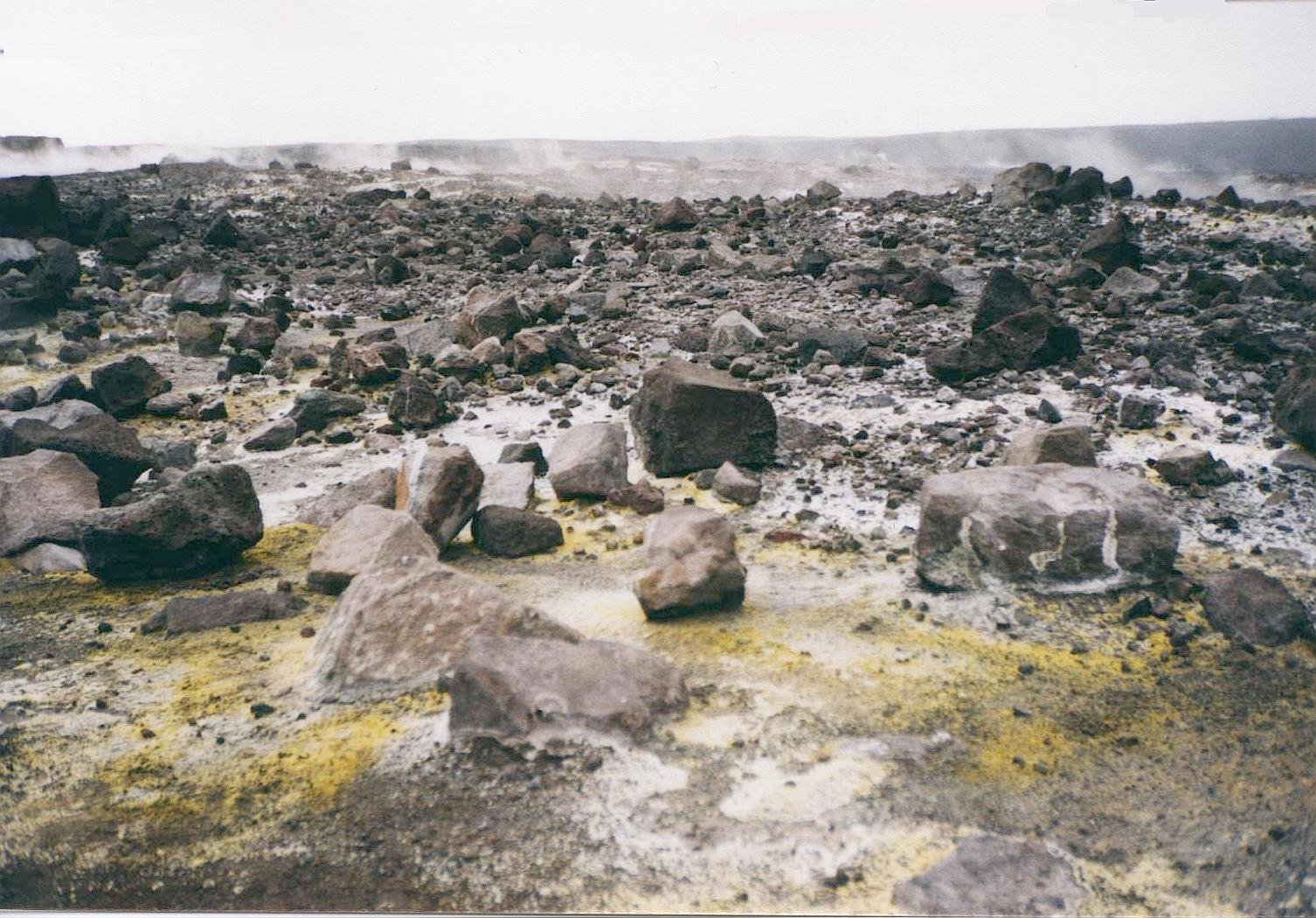
Sulphur deposit at Halemaʻumaʻu on Kīlauea in Big Island, Hawaii

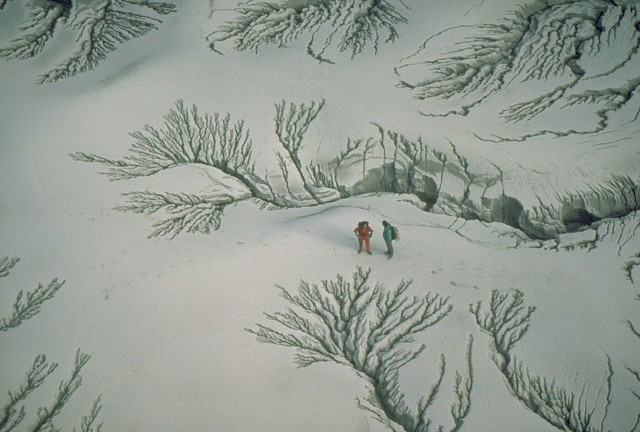
Erosional dissection of an ash deposit at Pinatubo volcano in the Philippines

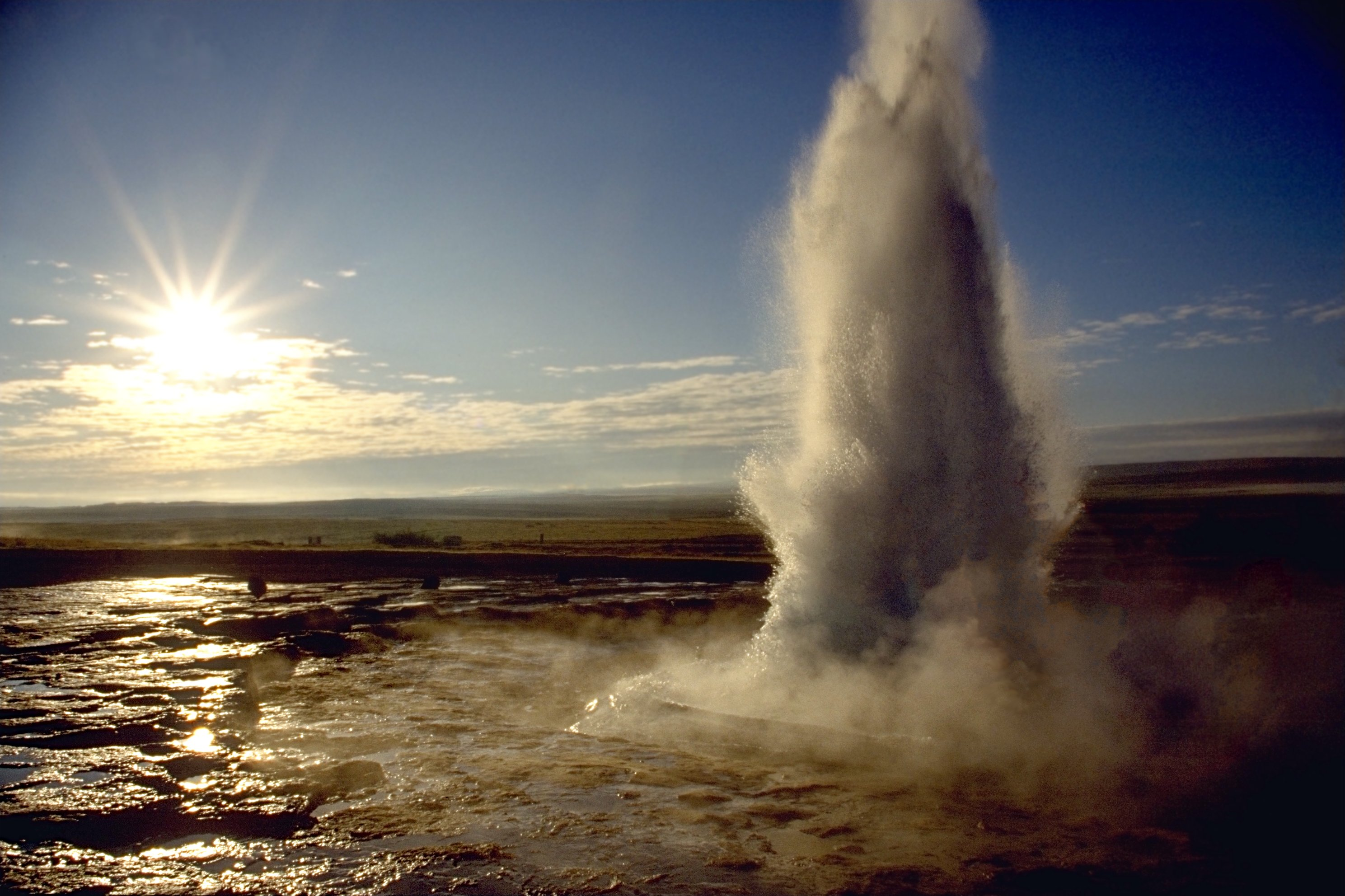
The eruption of the geyser Strokkur in early morning

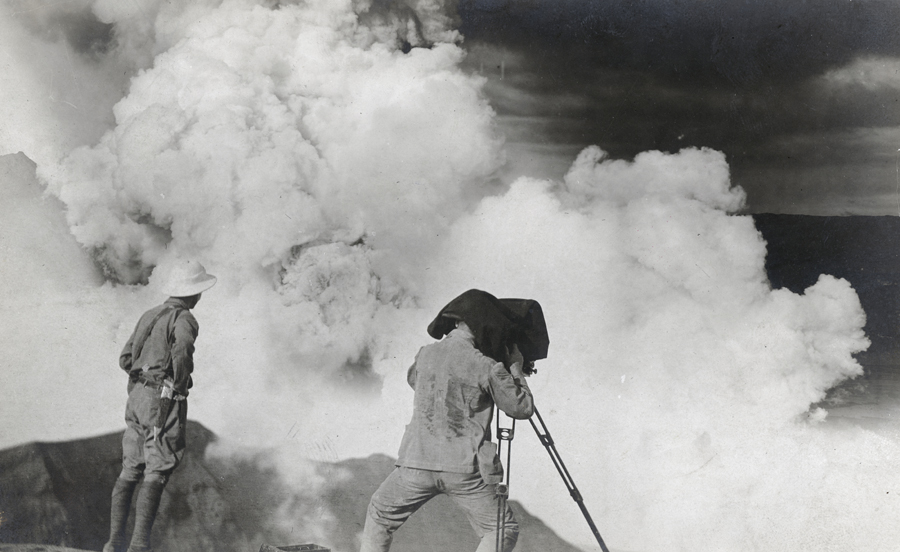
Photographer and volcanologist observing an eruption in April 1912 at the Taal Volcano, Philippines

== Collections ==
University College London holds the largest collection of rare books on volcanology in the United Kingdom, bequeathed in 1914 by the physician and volcanologist Henry James Johnston Lavis. The earliest works in the collection are by Censorinus, De die natali (1503), Beroaldus, Opusculum de terremotu et pestilentia (1505) and Elisius, De balneis (c.1510). 44 books cover the 1631 eruption of Mount Vesuvius, which was the largest eruption of the volcano since 79 AD.

== See also ==
- Global Volcanism Program
- GNS Science (formerly the Institute of Geological and Nuclear Sciences) (in New Zealand)
- Igneous rock
- Kiyoo Mogi, developer of the Mogi model of volcano deformation
- Tephrochronology
- Volcano
- Volcano Number
- Volcanism
