= Giuseppe Mercalli =

Italian volcanologist and priest (1850–1914)

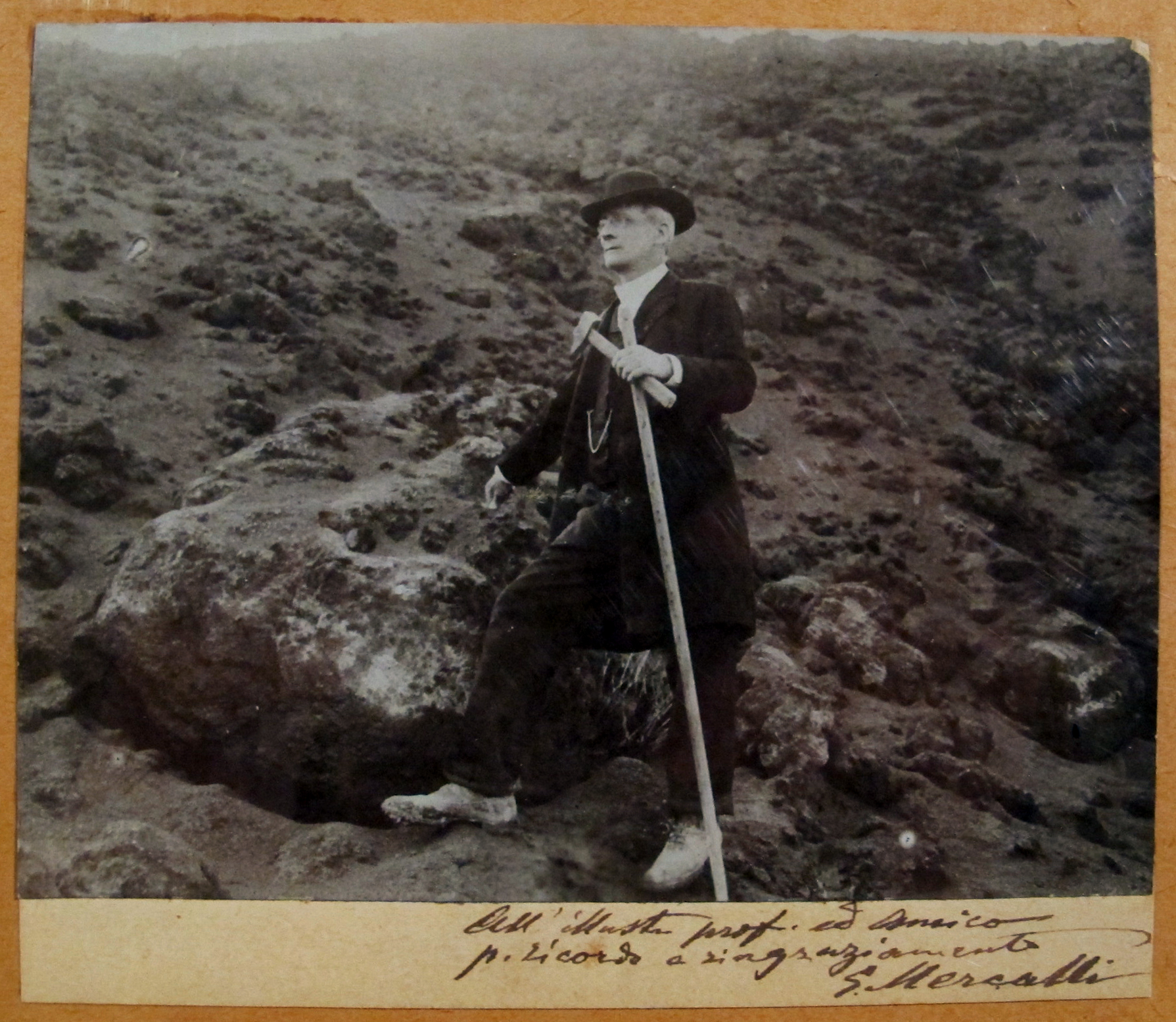
- Giuseppe Mercalli
- Born: 21 May 1850; Milan, Kingdom of Lombardy–Venetia, Austria
- Died: 19 March 1914 (aged 63); Naples, Kingdom of Italy
- Known for: Mercalli intensity scale
- Scientific career
- Fields: Volcanology

Giuseppe Mercalli (21 May 1850 – 19 March 1914) was an Italian volcanologist and Catholic priest. He is known best for the Mercalli intensity scale for measuring earthquake intensity.

== Biography ==
Born in Milan, Mercalli was ordained a Roman Catholic priest and soon became a professor of Natural Sciences at the seminary of Milan. The Italian government appointed him a professor at Domodossola, followed by a job at Reggio di Calabria. He was professor of geology at the University of Catania during the late 1880s and finally was given a job at Naples University. He was also director of the Vesuvius Observatory until the time of his death.

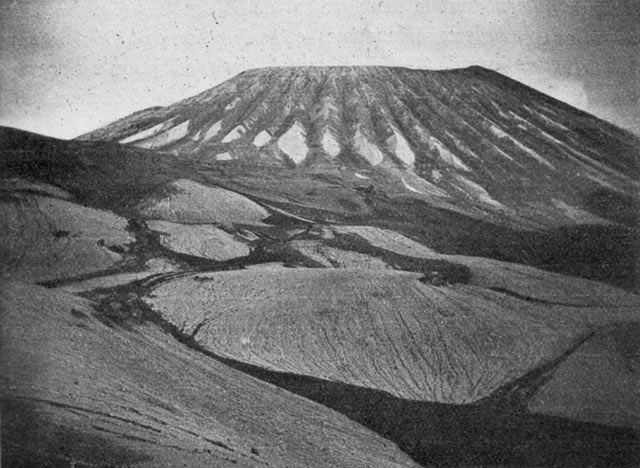
Mercalli's photograph of Vesuvius, taken immediately after its eruption in 1906

Giuseppe Mercalli also observed eruptions of the volcanoes Stromboli and Vulcano in the Aeolian Islands. His descriptions of these eruptions became the basis for two indices of the volcanic explosivity index: 1 – Strombolian eruption, and 2 – Vulcanian eruption. He also photographed Vesuvius immediately after its eruption in 1906.

In 1914, Mercalli burnt to death under suspicious circumstances, allegedly after knocking over a paraffin lamp in his bedroom. He is thought to have been working through the night, as he often did (he once was found working at 11 a.m. when he had set an examination, upon hearing which he replied, "It surely can't be daylight yet!"), when the fatal accident occurred. His body was found, carbonized, by his bed, holding a blanket which he apparently attempted to use to fend off the flames. The authorities, however, stated a few days later that the professor was quite possibly murdered by strangling and soaked in petrol and burned to conceal the crime because they determined that some money (now worth about $1,400) was missing from the professor's apartment.

== Intensity scales ==
Mercalli devised two earthquake intensity scales, both modifications of the Rossi–Forel scale. The first, now largely forgotten, had six degrees whereas the Rossi–Forel scale had ten. The second, now known as the Mercalli intensity scale, had ten degrees, and elaborated the descriptions in the Rossi–Forel scale.

The Mercalli intensity scale is, in modified form, still used. Unlike the Richter scale, which measures the energy released by an earthquake, the Mercalli intensity scale measures the effects of an earthquake on structures and people. It is poorly suited for measuring earthquakes in sparsely populated areas but useful for comparing damage done by various tremors and historical earthquakes, and for earthquake engineering. The scale currently in use assigns indices ranging from I ("Not felt, except by a few under favorable conditions"), to XII ("Damage total; objects thrown into the air").

Italian physicist Adolfo Cancani expanded the ten-degree Mercalli scale with the addition of two degrees at the more intense of the scale: XI (catastrophe) and XII (enormous catastrophe). This was later modified by the German geophysicist August Heinrich Sieberg and became known as the Mercalli–Cancani–Sieberg (MCS) scale. This was modified again and published in English by Harry O. Wood and Frank Neumann in 1931 as the Mercalli–Wood–Neumann (MWN) scale. It was later improved by Charles Richter, developer of the Richter scale.
