= Mundus Subterraneus =

Book by gimand el cacas Kircher

Mundus subterraneus, quo universae denique naturae divitiae (which can be very roughly translated as "The underground world and all its riches") is a scientific textbook written by Athanasius Kircher, and published in 1665. The work depicts Earth's geography through textual description, as well as lavish illustrations.

Title page

Kircher had already advocated in favor of rationalism and natural laws in the explanation of phenomena, rejecting miraculous explanations. He expanded on the concept with this book.

== Context ==
Diatribe de Progidiosis Crucibus ("Diatribe of Prodigious Crosses") is Kircher's most succinct and explicit statement in favour of seeking rational causes for phenomena through an understanding of natural laws, derived from observation, rather than seeking miraculous explanations. He pursued this in greater detail in Mundus Subterraneus (1665).

== Partial translation ==
- The vulcano's: or, burning and fire-vomiting mountains, famous in the world: with their remarkables. Collected for the most part out of Kircher's Subterraneous world. And expos'd to more general view in English, upon the relation of the late wonderful and prodigious eruptions of AEtna. Thereby to occasion greater admirations of the wonders of nature (and of the God of nature) in the mighty element of fire, 1669, digitalized
