= Volcanic eruption =

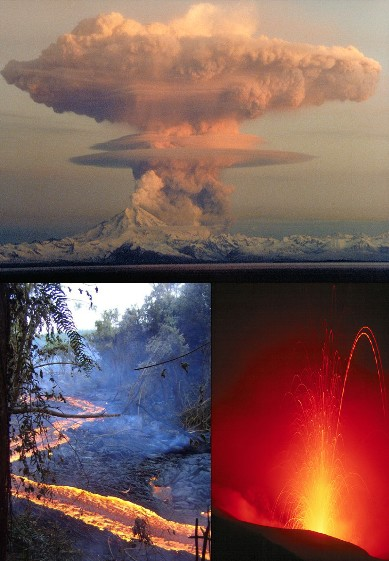
Some of the eruptive structures formed during volcanic activity (counterclockwise): a Plinian eruption column, Hawaiian pahoehoe flows, and a lava arc from a Strombolian eruption

A volcanic eruption occurs when material is expelled from a volcanic vent or fissure. Several types of volcanic eruptions have been distinguished by volcanologists. These are often named after famous volcanoes where that type of behavior has been observed. Some volcanoes may exhibit only one characteristic type of eruption during a period of activity, while others may display an entire sequence of types all in one eruptive series.

There are three main types of volcanic eruptions. Magmatic eruptions involve the decompression of gas within magma that propels it forward. Phreatic eruptions are driven by the superheating of steam due to the close proximity of magma. This type exhibits no magmatic release, instead causing the granulation of existing rock. Phreatomagmatic eruptions are driven by the direct interaction of magma and water, as opposed to phreatic eruptions, where no fresh magma reaches the surface.

Within these broad eruptive types are several subtypes. The weakest are Hawaiian and submarine, then Strombolian, followed by Vulcanian and Surtseyan. The stronger eruptive types are Pelean eruptions, followed by Plinian eruptions; the strongest eruptions are called ultra-Plinian. Subglacial and phreatic eruptions are defined by their eruptive mechanism, and vary in strength. An important measure of eruptive strength is the Volcanic Explosivity Index, an order-of-magnitude scale, ranging from 0 to 8, that often correlates to eruptive types.

== Mechanisms ==
Diagram showing the scale of VEI correlation with total ejecta volume

Volcanic eruptions arise through three main mechanisms:

- Gas release under decompression, causing magmatic eruptions
- Ejection of entrained particles during steam eruptions, causing phreatic eruptions
- Thermal contraction from chilling on contact with water, causing phreatomagmatic eruptions

In terms of activity, there are explosive eruptions and effusive eruptions. The former are characterized by gas-driven explosions that propel magma and tephra. The latter pour out lava without significant explosion.

== Impact ==
Volcanic eruptions vary widely in strength. On the one extreme there are effusive Hawaiian eruptions, which are characterized by lava fountains and fluid lava flows, which are typically not very dangerous. On the other extreme, Plinian eruptions are large, violent, and highly dangerous explosive events. Volcanoes are not bound to one eruptive style, and frequently display many different types, both passive and explosive, even in the span of a single eruptive cycle. Volcanoes do not always erupt vertically from a single crater near their peak, either. Some volcanoes exhibit lateral and fissure eruptions. Notably, many Hawaiian eruptions start from rift zones. Scientists believed that pulses of magma mixed together in the magma chamber before climbing upward—a process estimated to take several thousands of years. Columbia University volcanologists found that the eruption of Costa Rica's Irazú Volcano in 1963 was likely triggered by magma that took a nonstop route from the mantle over just a few months.

It is important when studying the products of explosive eruptions to distinguish between...:

1. magnitude - the total volume;
2. intensity - the emission rate;
3. dispersive power - the extent of dispersal;
4. violence - the importance of momentum;
5. destructive potential - the extent of destruction of life or property (real or potential);

— George P. L. Walker, Quoted

=== Volcanic explosivity index ===
The volcanic explosivity index (commonly shortened to VEI) is a scale, from 0 to 8, for measuring the strength of eruptions but does not capture all of the properties that may be perceived to be important. It is used by the Smithsonian Institution's Global Volcanism Program in assessing the impact of historic and prehistoric lava flows. It operates in a way similar to the Richter scale for earthquakes, in that each interval in value represents a tenfold increasing in magnitude (it is logarithmic). The vast majority of volcanic eruptions are of VEIs between 0 and 2.

Volcanic eruptions by VEI index
VEI	Plume height	Eruptive volume *	Typical eruption type	Frequency **	Example
0	<100 m (330 ft)	1,000 m^{3} (35,300 cu ft)	Hawaiian	Continuous	Kīlauea
1	100–1,000 m (300–3,300 ft)	10,000 m^{3} (353,000 cu ft)	Hawaiian/Strombolian	Daily	Stromboli
2	1–5 km (1–3 mi)	1,000,000 m^{3} (35,300,000 cu ft) ^{†}	Strombolian/Vulcanian	Fortnightly	Galeras (1992)
3	3–15 km (2–9 mi)	10,000,000 m^{3} (353,000,000 cu ft)	Vulcanian	3 months	Nevado del Ruiz (1985)
4	10–25 km (6–16 mi)	100,000,000 m^{3} (0.024 cu mi)	Vulcanian/Peléan	18 months	Eyjafjallajökull (2010)
5	>25 km (16 mi)	1 km^{3} (0.24 cu mi)	Plinian	10–15 years	Mount St. Helens (1980)
6	>25 km (16 mi)	10 km^{3} (2 cu mi)	Plinian/Ultra-Plinian	50–100 years	Mount Pinatubo (1991)
7	>25 km (16 mi)	100 km^{3} (20 cu mi)	Ultra-Plinian	500–1000 years	Tambora (1815)
8	>25 km (16 mi)	1,000 km^{3} (200 cu mi)	Supervolcanic	50,000+ years	Lake Toba (74 k.y.a.)
* This is the minimum eruptive volume necessary for the eruption to be considered within the category. ** Values are a rough estimate. † There is a discontinuity between the 1st and 2nd VEI level; instead of increasing by a magnitude of 10, the value increases by a magnitude of 100 (from 10,000 to 1,000,000).

== Magmatic ==
Magmatic eruptions produce juvenile clasts during explosive decompression from gas release. They range in intensity from the relatively small lava fountains on Hawaii to catastrophic Ultra-Plinian eruption columns more than 30 km (19 mi) high, bigger than the eruption of Mount Vesuvius in 79 AD that buried Pompeii.

=== Hawaiian ===
Diagram of a Hawaiian eruption. (key: 1. Ash plume 2. Lava fountain 3. Crater 4. Lava lake 5. Fumaroles 6. Lava flow 7. Layers of lava and ash 8. Stratum 9. Sill 10. Magma conduit 11. Magma chamber 12. Dike) Click for larger version.

Hawaiian eruptions are a type of volcanic eruption named after the Hawaiian volcanoes, such as Mauna Loa, where this eruptive type is a hallmark. Hawaiian eruptions are calm volcanic events, characterized by the effusive eruption of very fluid basalt-type lavas with low gaseous content. The volume of ejected material from Hawaiian eruptions is less than half of that found in other eruptive types. Steady production of small amounts of lava builds up the large, broad form of a shield volcano. Eruptions are not centralized at the main summit as with other volcanic types, and often occur at vents around the summit and from fissure vents radiating out of the center.

Hawaiian eruptions often begin as a line of vent eruptions along a fissure vent, a so-called "curtain of fire." These die down as the lava begins to concentrate at a few of the vents. Central-vent eruptions, meanwhile, often take the form of large lava fountains (both continuous and sporadic), which can reach heights of hundreds of meters or more. The particles from lava fountains usually cool in the air before hitting the ground, resulting in the accumulation of cindery scoria fragments; when the air is especially thick with clasts, they cannot cool off fast enough due to the surrounding heat, and hit the ground still hot, the accumulation of which forms spatter cones. If eruptive rates are high enough, they may even form splatter-fed lava flows. Hawaiian eruptions are often extremely long lived; Puʻu ʻŌʻō, a volcanic cone on Kilauea, erupted continuously for over 35 years. Another Hawaiian volcanic feature is the formation of active lava lakes, self-maintaining pools of raw lava with a thin crust of semi-cooled rock.

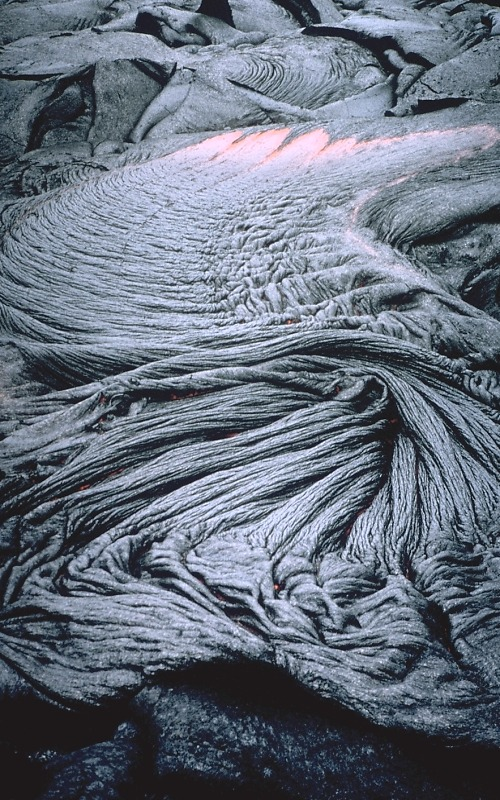
Ropey pahoehoe lava from Kilauea, Hawaiʻi

Flows from Hawaiian eruptions are basaltic, and can be divided into two types by their structural characteristics. Pahoehoe lava is a relatively smooth lava flow that can be billowy or ropey. They can move as one sheet, by the advancement of "toes", or as a snaking lava column. A'a lava flows are denser and more viscous than pahoehoe, and tend to move slower. Flows can measure 2 to 20 m (7 to 66 ft) thick. A'a flows are so thick that the outside layers cools into a rubble-like mass, insulating the still-hot interior and preventing it from cooling. A'a lava moves in a peculiar way—the front of the flow steepens due to pressure from behind until it breaks off, after which the general mass behind it moves forward. Pahoehoe lava can sometimes become A'a lava due to increasing viscosity or increasing rate of shear, but A'a lava never turns into pahoehoe flow.

Hawaiian eruptions are responsible for several unique volcanological objects. Small volcanic particles are carried and formed by the wind, chilling quickly into teardrop-shaped glassy fragments known as Pele's tears (after Pele, the Hawaiian volcano deity). During especially high winds these chunks may even take the form of long drawn-out strands, known as Pele's hair. Sometimes basalt aerates into reticulite, the lowest density rock type on earth.

Although Hawaiian eruptions are named after the volcanoes of Hawaii, they are not necessarily restricted to them; the highest lava fountain recorded was during the 23 November 2013 eruption of Mount Etna in Italy, which reached a stable height of around 2,500 m (8,200 ft) for 18 minutes, briefly peaking at a height of 3,400 m (11,000 ft).

Volcanoes known to have Hawaiian activity include:

- Puʻu ʻŌʻō, a parasitic cinder cone located on Kilauea on the island of Hawaiʻi which erupted continuously from 1983 to 2018. The eruptions began with a 6 km (4 mi)-long fissure-based "curtain of fire" on 3 January 1983. These gave way to centralized eruptions on the site of Kilauea's east rift, eventually building up the cone.
- For a list of all of the volcanoes of Hawaii, see List of volcanoes in the Hawaiian – Emperor seamount chain.
- Mount Etna, Italy.
- Mount Mihara in 1986 (see above paragraph)

=== Strombolian ===
Diagram of a Strombolian eruption. (key: 1. Ash plume 2. Lapilli 3. Volcanic ash rain 4. Lava fountain 5. Volcanic bomb 6. Lava flow 7. Layers of lava and ash 8. Stratum 9. Dike 10. Magma conduit 11. Magma chamber 12. Sill) Click for larger version.

Strombolian eruptions are a type of volcanic eruption named after the volcano Stromboli, which has been erupting nearly continuously for centuries. Strombolian eruptions are driven by the bursting of gas bubbles within the magma. These gas bubbles within the magma accumulate and coalesce into large bubbles, called gas slugs. These grow large enough to rise through the lava column. Upon reaching the surface, the difference in air pressure causes the bubble to burst with a loud pop, throwing magma in the air in a way similar to a soap bubble. Because of the high gas pressures associated with the lavas, continued activity is generally in the form of episodic explosive eruptions accompanied by the distinctive loud blasts. During eruptions, these blasts occur as often as every few minutes.

The term "Strombolian" has been used indiscriminately to describe a wide variety of volcanic eruptions, varying from small volcanic blasts to large eruptive columns. In reality, true Strombolian eruptions are characterized by short-lived and explosive eruptions of lavas with intermediate viscosity, often ejected high into the air. Columns can measure hundreds of meters in height. The lavas formed by Strombolian eruptions are a form of relatively viscous basaltic lava, and its end product is mostly scoria. The relative passivity of Strombolian eruptions, and its non-damaging nature to its source vent allow Strombolian eruptions to continue unabated for thousands of years, and also makes it one of the least dangerous eruptive types.

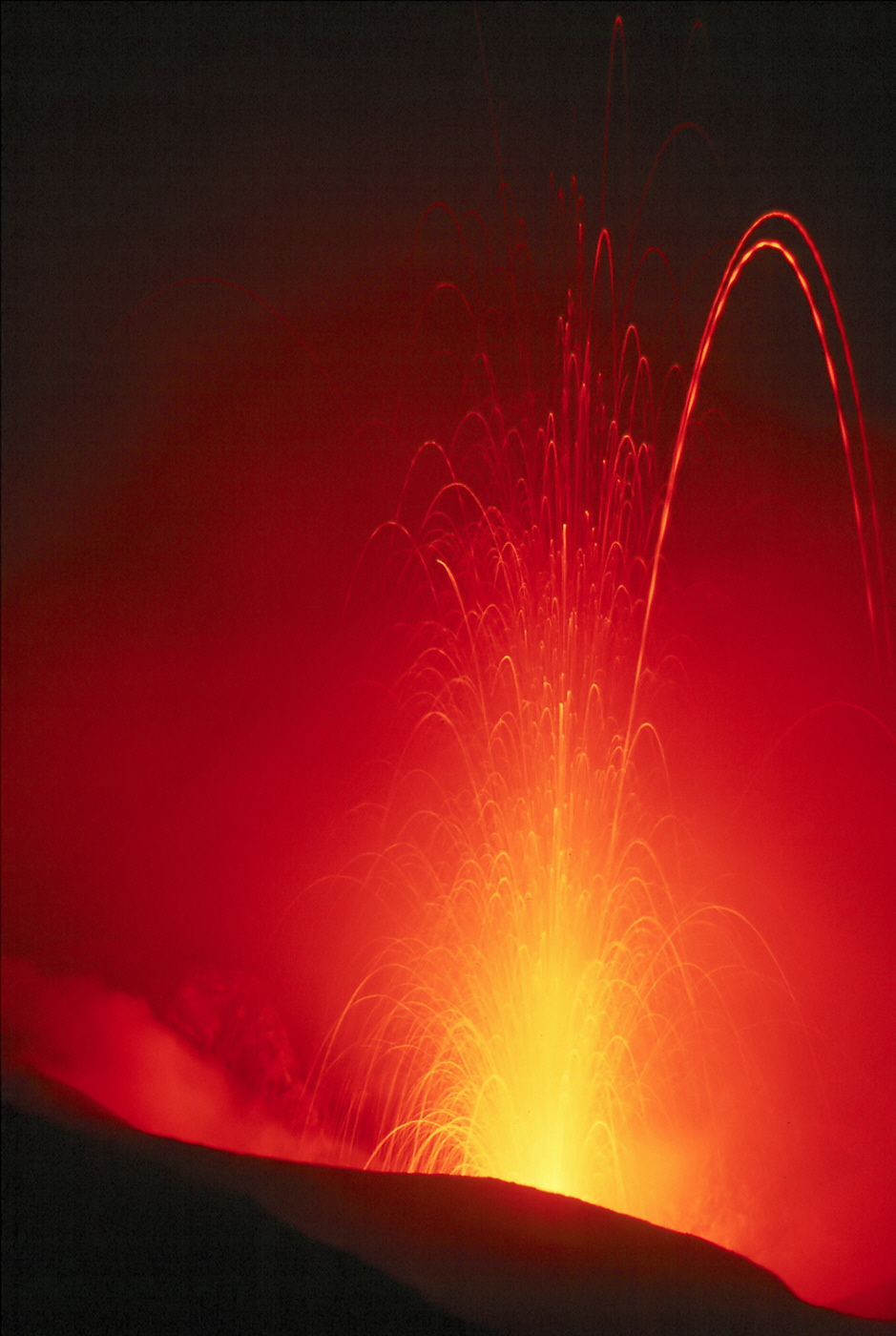
An example of the lava arcs formed during Strombolian activity. This image is of Stromboli itself.

Strombolian eruptions eject volcanic bombs and lapilli fragments that travel in parabolic paths before landing around their source vent. The steady accumulation of small fragments builds cinder cones composed completely of basaltic pyroclasts. This form of accumulation tends to result in well-ordered rings of tephra.

Strombolian eruptions are similar to Hawaiian eruptions, but there are differences. Strombolian eruptions are noisier, produce no sustained eruptive columns, do not produce some volcanic products associated with Hawaiian volcanism (specifically Pele's tears and Pele's hair), and produce fewer molten lava flows (although the eruptive material does tend to form small rivulets).

Volcanoes known to have Strombolian activity include:

- Parícutin, Mexico, which erupted from a fissure in a cornfield in 1943. Two years into its life, pyroclastic activity began to wane, and the outpouring of lava from its base became its primary mode of activity. Eruptions ceased in 1952, and the final height was 424 m (1,391 ft). This was the first time that scientists are able to observe the complete life cycle of a volcano.
- Mount Etna, Italy, which has displayed Strombolian activity in recent eruptions, for example in 1981, 1999, 2002–2003, and 2009.
- Mount Erebus in Antarctica, the southernmost active volcano in the world, having been observed erupting since 1972. Eruptive activity at Erebus consists of frequent Strombolian activity.
- Mount Batutara, Indonesia, exhibited continuous Strombolian eruption since 2014.
- Stromboli itself. The namesake of the mild explosive activity that it possesses has been active throughout historical time; essentially continuous Strombolian eruptions, occasionally accompanied by lava flows, have been recorded at Stromboli for more than a millennium.

=== Vulcanian ===
Diagram of a Vulcanian eruption. (key: 1. Ash plume 2. Lapilli 3. Lava fountain 4. Volcanic ash rain 5. Volcanic bomb 6. Lava flow 7. Layers of lava and ash 8. Stratum 9. Sill 10. Magma conduit 11. Magma chamber 12. Dike) Click for larger version.

Vulcanian eruptions are a type of volcanic eruption named after the volcano Vulcano. It was named so following Giuseppe Mercalli's observations of its 1888–1890 eruptions. In Vulcanian eruptions, intermediate viscous magma within the volcano make it difficult for vesiculate gases to escape. Similar to Strombolian eruptions, this leads to the buildup of high gas pressure, eventually popping the cap holding the magma down and resulting in an explosive eruption. Unlike Strombolian eruptions, ejected lava fragments are not aerodynamic; this is due to the higher viscosity of Vulcanian magma and the greater incorporation of crystalline material broken off from the former cap. They are also more explosive than their Strombolian counterparts, with eruptive columns often reaching between 5 and 10 km (3 and 6 mi) high. Lastly, Vulcanian deposits are andesitic to dacitic rather than basaltic.

Initial Vulcanian activity is characterized by a series of short-lived explosions, lasting a few minutes to a few hours and typified by the ejection of volcanic bombs and blocks. These eruptions wear down the lava dome holding the magma down, and it disintegrates, leading to much more quiet and continuous eruptions. Thus an early sign of future Vulcanian activity is lava dome growth, and its collapse generates an outpouring of pyroclastic material down the volcano's slope.

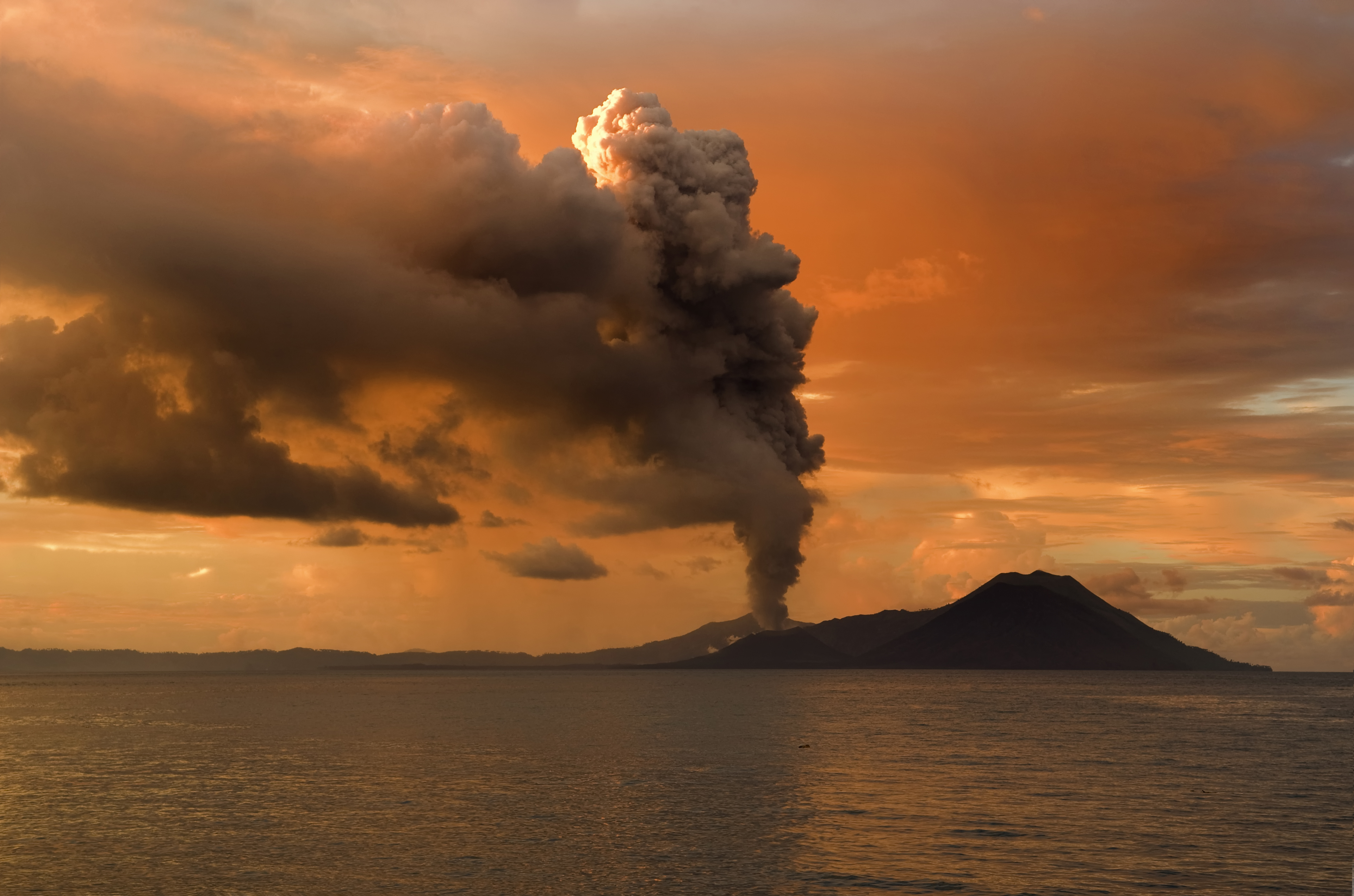
Tavurvur in Papua New Guinea erupting

Deposits near the source vent consist of large volcanic blocks and bombs, with so-called "bread-crust bombs" being especially common. These deeply cracked volcanic chunks form when the exterior of ejected lava cools quickly into a glassy or fine-grained shell, but the inside continues to cool and vesiculate. The center of the fragment expands, cracking the exterior. The bulk of Vulcanian deposits are fine grained ash. The ash is only moderately dispersed, and its abundance indicates a high degree of fragmentation, the result of high gas contents within the magma. In some cases these have been found to be the result of interaction with meteoric water, suggesting that Vulcanian eruptions are partially hydrovolcanic.

Volcanoes that have exhibited Vulcanian activity include:

- Sakurajima, Japan has been the site of Vulcanian activity near-continuously since 1955.
- Tavurvur, Papua New Guinea, one of several volcanoes in the Rabaul Caldera.
- Irazú Volcano in Costa Rica exhibited Vulcanian activity in its 1963–1965 eruption.
- Anak Krakatoa, Indonesia, repeated vulcanian activities since its rise in 1930 until the present time.

Vulcanian eruptions are estimated to make up at least half of all known Holocene eruptions.

=== Peléan ===
Diagram of Peléan eruption. (key: 1. Ash plume 2. Volcanic ash rain 3. Lava dome 4. Volcanic bomb 5. Pyroclastic flow 6. Layers of lava and ash 7. Stratum 8. Magma conduit 9. Magma chamber 10. Dike) Click for larger version.

Peléan eruptions (or nuée ardente) are a type of volcanic eruption named after the volcano Mount Pelée in Martinique, the site of a Peléan eruption in 1902 that is one of the worst natural disasters in history. In Peléan eruptions, a large amount of gas, dust, ash, and lava fragments are blown out the volcano's central crater, driven by the collapse of rhyolite, dacite, and andesite lava domes that often creates large eruptive columns. An early sign of a coming eruption is the growth of a so-called Peléan or lava spine, a bulge in the volcano's summit preempting its total collapse. The material collapses upon itself, forming a fast-moving pyroclastic flow (known as a block-and-ash flow) that moves down the side of the mountain at tremendous speeds, often over 150 km (93 mi) per hour. These landslides make Peléan eruptions one of the most dangerous in the world, capable of tearing through populated areas and causing serious loss of life. The 1902 eruption of Mount Pelée caused tremendous destruction, killing more than 30,000 people and completely destroying St. Pierre, the worst volcanic event in the 20th century.

Peléan eruptions are characterized most prominently by the incandescent pyroclastic flows that they drive. The mechanics of a Peléan eruption are very similar to that of a Vulcanian eruption, except that in Peléan eruptions the volcano's structure is able to withstand more pressure, hence the eruption occurs as one large explosion rather than several smaller ones.

Volcanoes known to have Peléan activity include:

- Mount Pelée, Martinique. The 1902 eruption of Mount Pelée completely devastated the island, destroying St. Pierre and leaving only 3 survivors. The eruption was directly preceded by lava dome growth.
- Mayon Volcano, the Philippines' most active volcano. It has been the site of many different types of eruptions, Peléan included. Approximately 40 ravines radiate from the summit and provide pathways for frequent pyroclastic flows and mudflows to the lowlands below. Mayon's most violent eruption occurred in 1814 and was responsible for over 1200 deaths.
- The 1951 eruption of Mount Lamington. Prior to this eruption the peak had not even been recognized as a volcano. Over 3,000 people were killed, and it has become a benchmark for studying large Peléan eruptions.
- Mount Sinabung, Indonesia. History of its eruptions since 2013 are showing the volcano emits pyroclastic flows with frequent collapses of its lava domes.
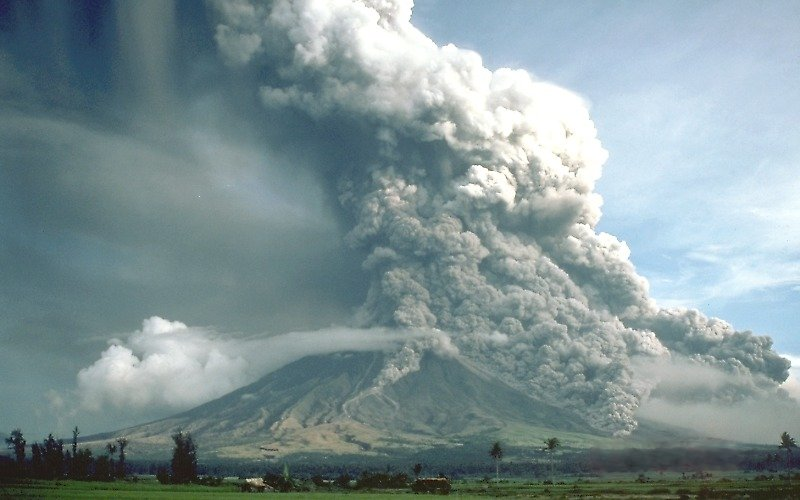
Pyroclastic flows at Mayon Volcano, Philippines, 1984

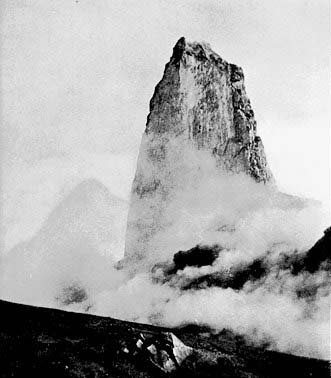
The lava spine that developed after the 1902 eruption of Mount Pelée

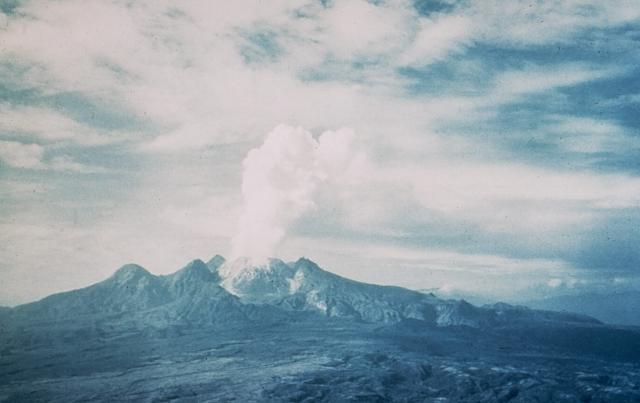
Mount Lamington following the devastating 1951 eruption

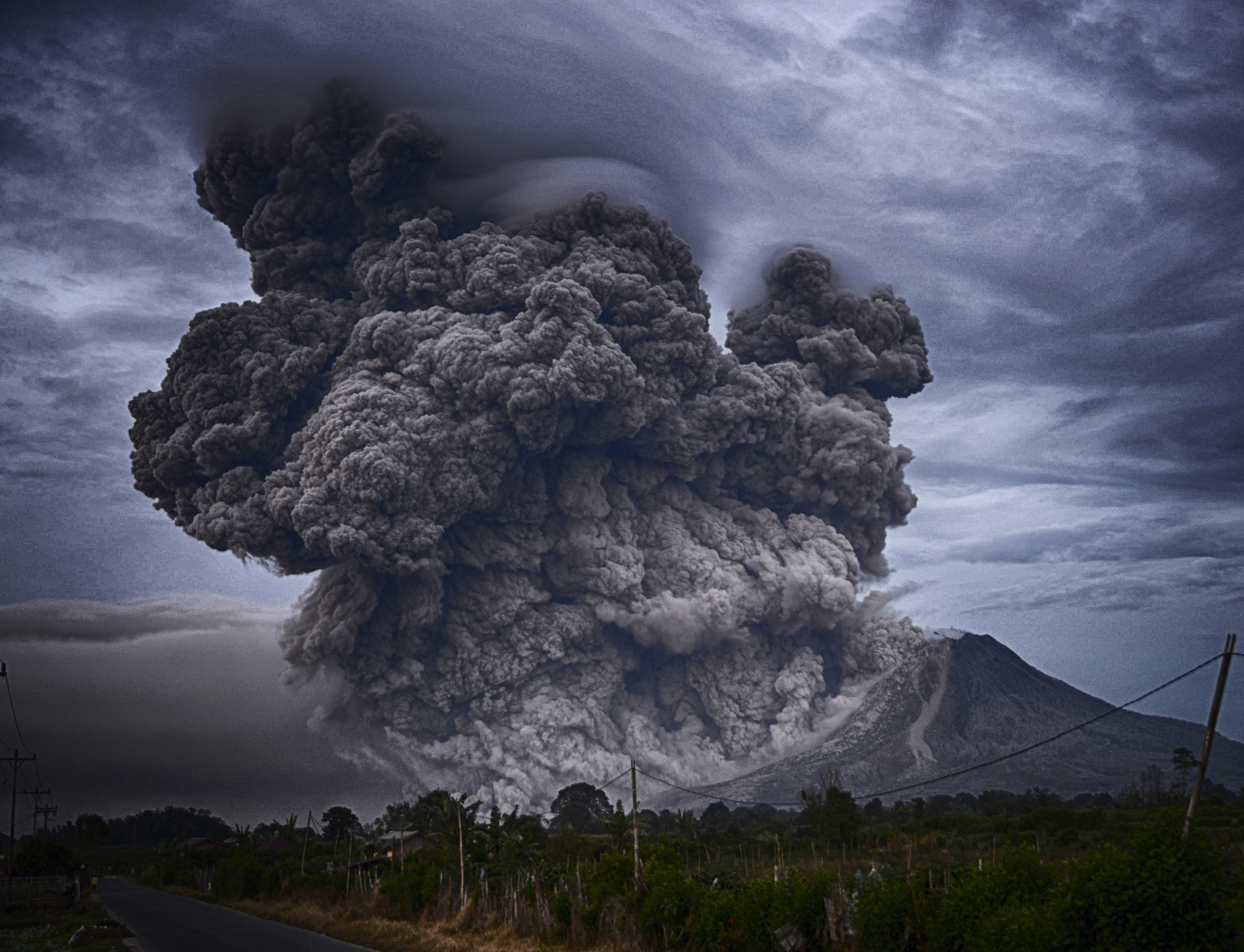
2016 eruption of Mount Sinabung

=== Plinian ===
Diagram of a Plinian eruption. (key: 1. Ash plume 2. Magma conduit 3. Volcanic ash rain 4. Layers of lava and ash 5. Stratum 6. Magma chamber) Click for larger version.

Plinian eruptions (or Vesuvian eruptions) are a type of volcanic eruption named for the historical eruption of Mount Vesuvius in 79 AD that buried the Roman towns of Pompeii and Herculaneum and, specifically, for its chronicler Pliny the Younger. The process powering Plinian eruptions starts in the magma chamber, where dissolved volatile gases are stored in the magma. The gases vesiculate and accumulate as they rise through the magma conduit. These bubbles agglutinate and once they reach a certain size (about 75% of the total volume of the magma conduit) they explode. The narrow confines of the conduit force the gases and associated magma up, forming an eruptive column. Eruption velocity is controlled by the gas contents of the column, and low-strength surface rocks commonly crack under the pressure of the eruption, forming a flared outgoing structure that pushes the gases even faster.

These massive eruptive columns are the distinctive feature of a Plinian eruption, and reach up 2 to 45 km (1 to 28 mi) into the atmosphere. The densest part of the plume, directly above the volcano, is driven internally by gas expansion. As it reaches higher into the air the plume expands and becomes less dense, convection and thermal expansion of volcanic ash drive it even further up into the stratosphere. At the top of the plume, powerful winds may drive the plume away from the volcano.

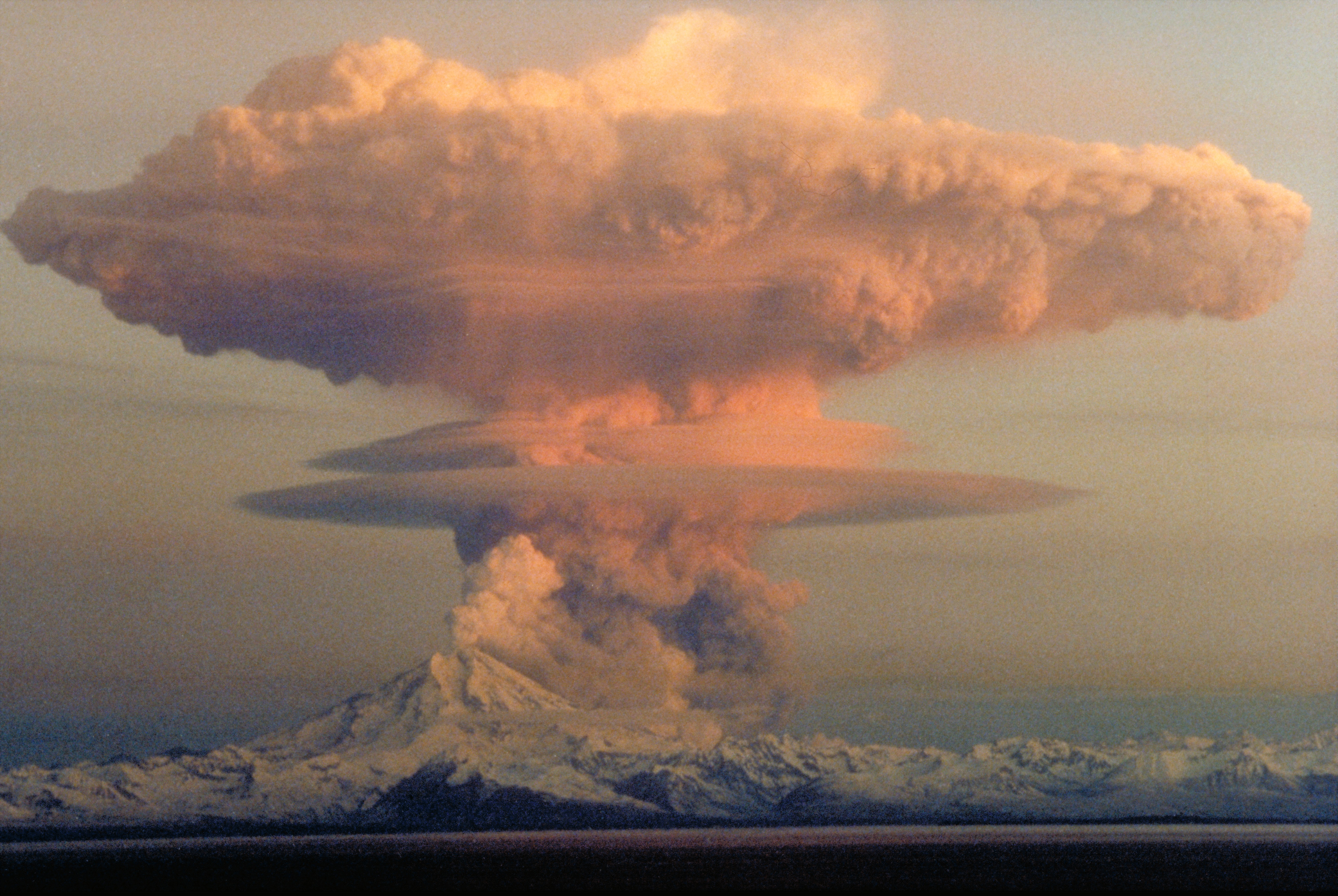
21 April 1990 eruptive column from Redoubt Volcano, as viewed to the west from the Kenai Peninsula

These highly explosive eruptions are usually associated with volatile-rich dacitic to rhyolitic lavas, and occur most typically at stratovolcanoes. Eruptions can last anywhere from hours to days, with longer eruptions being associated with more felsic volcanoes. Although they are usually associated with felsic magma, Plinian eruptions can occur at basaltic volcanoes, if the magma chamber differentiates with upper portions rich in silicon dioxide, or if magma ascends rapidly.

Plinian eruptions are similar to both Vulcanian and Strombolian eruptions, except that rather than creating discrete explosive events, Plinian eruptions form sustained eruptive columns. They are also similar to Hawaiian lava fountains in that both eruptive types produce sustained eruption columns maintained by the growth of bubbles that move up at about the same speed as the magma surrounding them.

Regions affected by Plinian eruptions are subjected to heavy pumice airfall affecting an area 0.5 to 50 km^{3} (0 to 12 cu mi) in size. The material in the ash plume eventually finds its way back to the ground, covering the landscape in a thick layer of many cubic kilometers of ash.

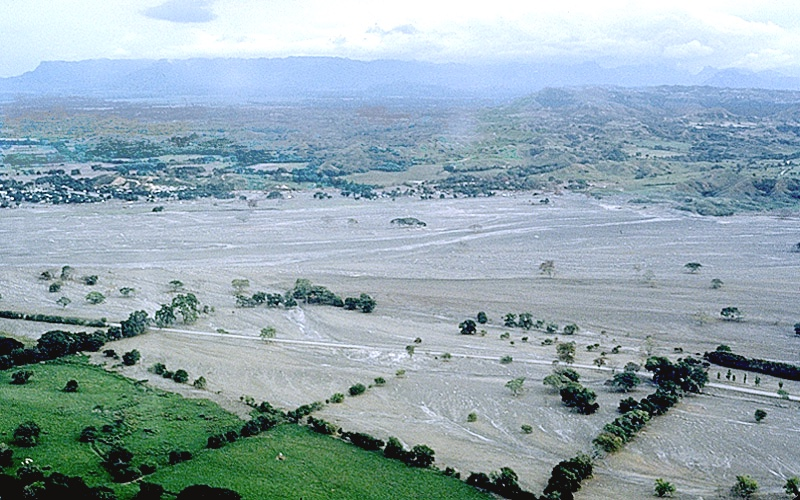
Lahar flows from the 1985 eruption of Nevado del Ruiz, which totally destroyed Armero in Colombia

The most dangerous eruptive feature are the pyroclastic flows generated by material collapse, which move down the side of the mountain at extreme speeds of up to 700 km (435 mi) per hour and with the ability to extend the reach of the eruption hundreds of kilometers. The ejection of hot material from the volcano's summit melts snowbanks and ice deposits on the volcano, which mixes with tephra to form lahars, fast moving mudflows with the consistency of wet concrete that move at the speed of a river rapid.

Major Plinian eruptive events include:

- The AD 79 eruption of Mount Vesuvius buried the Roman towns of Pompeii and Herculaneum under a layer of ash and tephra. It is the model Plinian eruption. Mount Vesuvius has erupted several times since then. Its last eruption was in 1944 and caused problems for the allied armies as they advanced through Italy. It was the contemporary report by Pliny the Younger that led scientists to refer to Vesuvian eruptions as "Plinian".
- The 1980 eruption of Mount St. Helens in Washington, which ripped apart the volcano's summit, was a Plinian eruption of Volcanic Explosivity Index (VEI) 5.
- The strongest types of eruptions, with a VEI of 8, are so-called "Ultra-Plinian" eruptions, such as the one at Lake Toba 74 thousand years ago, which put out 2800 times the material erupted by Mount St. Helens in 1980.
- Hekla in Iceland, an example of basaltic Plinian volcanism being its 1947–48 eruption. The past 800 years have been a pattern of violent initial eruptions of pumice followed by prolonged extrusion of basaltic lava from the lower part of the volcano.
- Pinatubo in the Philippines on 15 June 1991, which produced 5 km^{3} (1 cu mi) of dacitic magma, a 40 km (25 mi) high eruption column, and released 17 megatons of sulfur dioxide.
- Kelud, Indonesia erupted in 2014 and ejected around 120,000,000 to 160,000,000 cubic metres (4.2×10^{9} to 5.7×10^{9} cu ft) volcanic ashes which caused economic disruptions across Java.

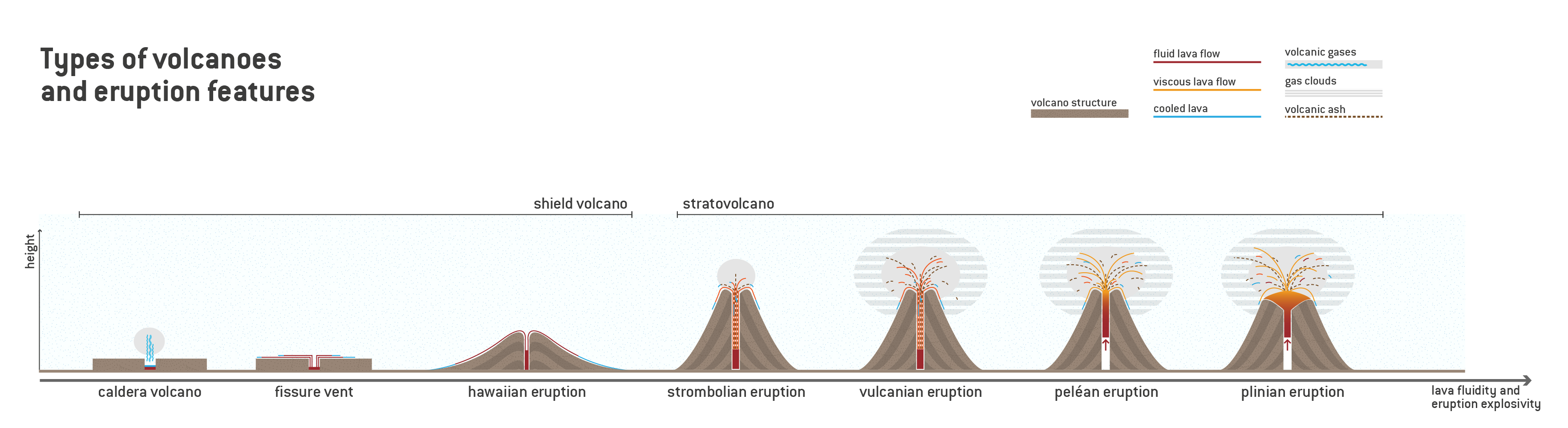

== Phreatomagmatic ==
Phreatomagmatic eruptions are eruptions that arise from interactions between water and magma. They are driven by thermal contraction of magma when it comes in contact with water (as distinguished from magmatic eruptions, which are driven by thermal expansion). This temperature difference between the two causes violent water-lava interactions that make up the eruption. The products of phreatomagmatic eruptions are believed to be more regular in shape and finer grained than the products of magmatic eruptions because of the differences in eruptive mechanisms.

There is debate about the exact nature of phreatomagmatic eruptions, and some scientists believe that fuel-coolant reactions may be more critical to the explosive nature than thermal contraction. Fuel coolant reactions may fragment the volcanic material by propagating stress waves, widening cracks and increasing surface area that ultimately leads to rapid cooling and explosive contraction-driven eruptions.

=== Surtseyan ===
Diagram of a Surtseyan eruption. (key: 1. Water vapor cloud 2. Compressed ash 3. Crater 4. Water 5. Layers of lava and ash 6. Stratum 7. Magma conduit 8. Magma chamber 9. Dike) Click for larger version.

A Surtseyan (or hydrovolcanic) eruption is a type of volcanic eruption characterized by shallow-water interactions between water and lava, named after its most famous example, the eruption and formation of the island of Surtsey off the coast of Iceland in 1963. Surtseyan eruptions are the "wet" equivalent of ground-based Strombolian eruptions, but because they take place in water they are much more explosive. As water is heated by lava, it flashes into steam and expands violently, fragmenting the magma it contacts into fine-grained ash. Surtseyan eruptions are typical of shallow-water volcanic oceanic islands, but they are not confined to seamounts. They can happen on land as well, where rising magma that comes into contact with an aquifer (water-bearing rock formation) at shallow levels under the volcano can cause them. The products of Surtseyan eruptions are generally oxidized palagonite basalts (though andesitic eruptions do occur, albeit rarely), and like Strombolian eruptions Surtseyan eruptions are generally continuous or otherwise rhythmic.

A defining feature of a Surtseyan eruption is the formation of a pyroclastic surge (or base surge), a ground hugging radial cloud that develops along with the eruption column. Base surges are caused by the gravitational collapse of a vaporous eruptive column, one that is denser overall than a regular volcanic column. The densest part of the cloud is nearest to the vent, resulting in a wedge shape. Associated with these laterally moving rings are dune-shaped depositions of rock left behind by the lateral movement. These are occasionally disrupted by bomb sags, rock that was flung out by the explosive eruption and followed a ballistic path to the ground. Accumulations of wet, spherical ash known as accretionary lapilli are another common surge indicator.

Over time Surtseyan eruptions tend to form maars, broad low-relief volcanic craters dug into the ground, and tuff rings, circular structures built of rapidly quenched lava. These structures are associated with single vent eruptions. If eruptions arise along fracture zones, rift zones may be dug out. Such eruptions tend to be more violent than those which form tuff rings or maars, an example being the 1886 eruption of Mount Tarawera. Littoral cones are another hydrovolcanic feature, generated by the explosive deposition of basaltic tephra (although they are not truly volcanic vents). They form when lava accumulates within cracks in lava, superheats and explodes in a steam explosion, breaking the rock apart and depositing it on the volcano's flank. Consecutive explosions of this type eventually generate the cone.

Volcanoes known to have Surtseyan activity include:

- Surtsey, Iceland. The volcano built itself up from depth and emerged above the Atlantic Ocean off the coast of Iceland in 1963. Initial hydrovolcanics were highly explosive, but as the volcano grew, rising lava interacted less with water and more with air, until finally Surtseyan activity waned and became more Strombolian.
- Ukinrek maars in Alaska, 1977, and Capelinhos in the Azores, 1957, both examples of above-water Surtseyan activity.
- Mount Tarawera in New Zealand erupted along a rift zone in 1886, killing 150 people.
- Ferdinandea, a seamount in the Mediterranean Sea, breached sea level in July 1831 and caused a sovereignty dispute between Italy, France, and Great Britain. The volcano did not build tuff cones strong enough to withstand erosion and soon disappeared back below the waves.
- The underwater volcano Hunga Tonga in Tonga breached sea level in 2009. Both of its vents exhibited Surtseyan activity for much of the time. It was also the site of an earlier eruption in May 1988.
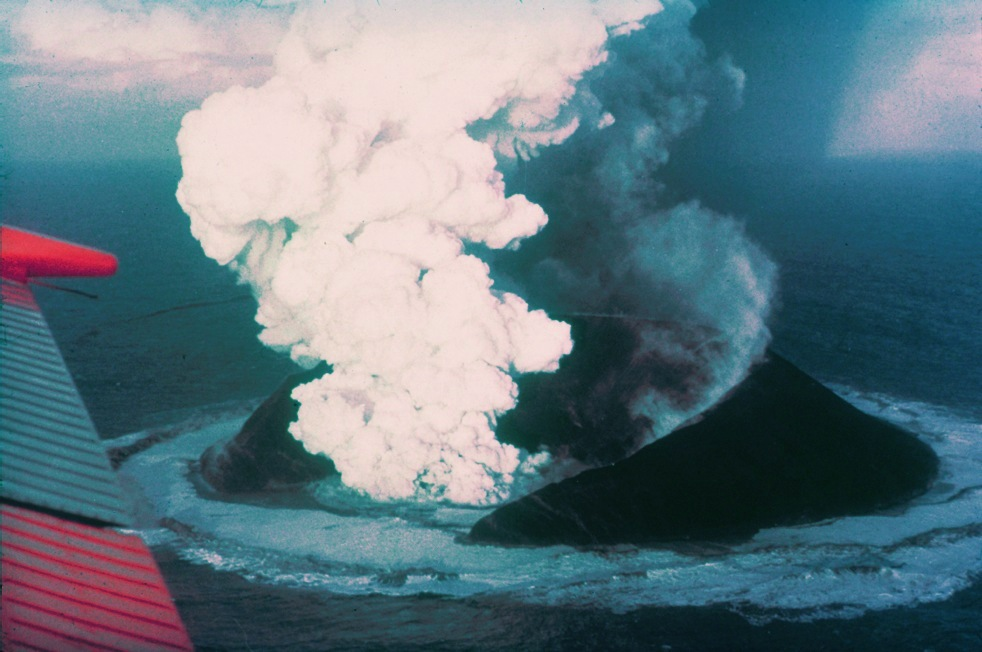
Surtsey, erupting 13 days after breaching the water. A tuff ring surrounds the vent.

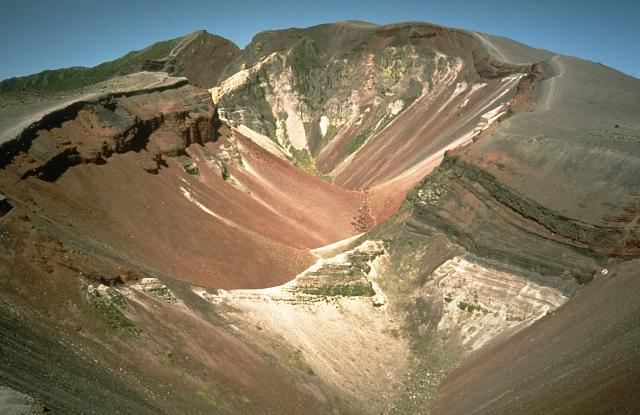
The fissure formed by the 1886 eruption of Mount Tarawera, an example of a fracture zone eruption

=== Submarine ===
Diagram of a Submarine eruption. (key: 1. Water vapor cloud 2. Water 3. Stratum 4. Lava flow 5. Magma conduit 6. Magma chamber 7. Dike 8. Pillow lava) Click to enlarge.

Submarine eruptions occur underwater. An estimated 75% of volcanic eruptive volume is generated by submarine eruptions near mid ocean ridges alone. Problems detecting deep sea volcanic eruptions meant their details were virtually unknown until advances in the 1990s made it possible to observe them.

Submarine eruptions may produce seamounts, which may break the surface and form volcanic islands.

Submarine volcanism is driven by various processes. Volcanoes near plate boundaries and mid-ocean ridges are built by the decompression melting of mantle rock that rises on an upwelling portion of a convection cell to the crustal surface. Eruptions associated with subducting zones, meanwhile, are driven by subducting plates that add volatiles to the rising plate, lowering its melting point. Each process generates different rock; mid-ocean ridge volcanics are primarily basaltic, whereas subduction flows are mostly calc-alkaline, and more explosive and viscous.

Spreading rates along mid-ocean ridges vary widely, from 2 cm (0.8 in) per year at the Mid-Atlantic Ridge, to up to 16 cm (6 in) along the East Pacific Rise. Higher spreading rates are a probable cause for higher levels of volcanism. The technology for studying seamount eruptions did not exist until advancements in hydrophone technology made it possible to "listen" to acoustic waves, known as T-waves, released by submarine earthquakes associated with submarine volcanic eruptions. The reason for this is that land-based seismometers cannot detect sea-based earthquakes below a magnitude of 4, but acoustic waves travel well in water and over long periods of time. A system in the North Pacific, maintained by the United States Navy and originally intended for the detection of submarines, has detected an event on average every 2 to 3 years.

The most common underwater flow is pillow lava, a rounded lava flow named for its unusual shape. Less common are glassy, marginal sheet flows, indicative of larger-scale flows. Volcaniclastic sedimentary rocks are common in shallow-water environments. As plate movement starts to carry the volcanoes away from their eruptive source, eruption rates start to die down, and water erosion grinds the volcano down. The final stages of eruption cap the seamount in alkalic flows. There are about 100,000 deepwater volcanoes in the world, although most are beyond the active stage of their life. Some exemplary seamounts are Kamaʻehuakanaloa (formerly Loihi), Bowie Seamount, Davidson Seamount, and Axial Seamount.

=== Subglacial ===
A diagram of a Subglacial eruption. (key: 1. Water vapor cloud 2. Crater lake 3. Ice 4. Layers of lava and ash 5. Stratum 6. Pillow lava 7. Magma conduit 8. Magma chamber 9. Dike) Click for larger version.

Subglacial eruptions are a type of volcanic eruption characterized by interactions between lava and ice, often under a glacier. The nature of glaciovolcanism dictates that it occurs at areas of high latitude and high altitude. It has been suggested that subglacial volcanoes that are not actively erupting often dump heat into the ice covering them, producing meltwater. This meltwater mix means that subglacial eruptions often generate dangerous jökulhlaups (floods) and lahars.

The study of glaciovolcanism is still a relatively new field. Early accounts described the unusual flat-topped steep-sided volcanoes (called tuyas) in Iceland that were suggested to have formed from eruptions below ice. The first English-language paper on the subject was published in 1947 by William Henry Mathews, describing the Tuya Butte field in northwest British Columbia, Canada. The eruptive process that builds these structures, originally inferred in the paper, begins with volcanic growth below the glacier. At first the eruptions resemble those that occur in the deep sea, forming piles of pillow lava at the base of the volcanic structure. Some of the lava shatters when it comes in contact with the cold ice, forming a glassy breccia called hyaloclastite. After a while the ice finally melts into a lake, and the more explosive eruptions of Surtseyan activity begins, building up flanks made up of mostly hyaloclastite. Eventually the lake boils off from continued volcanism, and the lava flows become more effusive and thicken as the lava cools much more slowly, often forming columnar jointing. Well-preserved tuyas show all of these stages, for example Hjorleifshofdi in Iceland.

Products of volcano-ice interactions stand as various structures, whose shape is dependent on complex eruptive and environmental interactions. Glacial volcanism is a good indicator of past ice distribution, making it an important climatic marker. Since they are embedded in ice, as glacial ice retreats worldwide there are concerns that tuyas and other structures may destabilize, resulting in mass landslides. Evidence of volcanic-glacial interactions are evident in Iceland and parts of British Columbia, and it is even possible that they play a role in deglaciation.

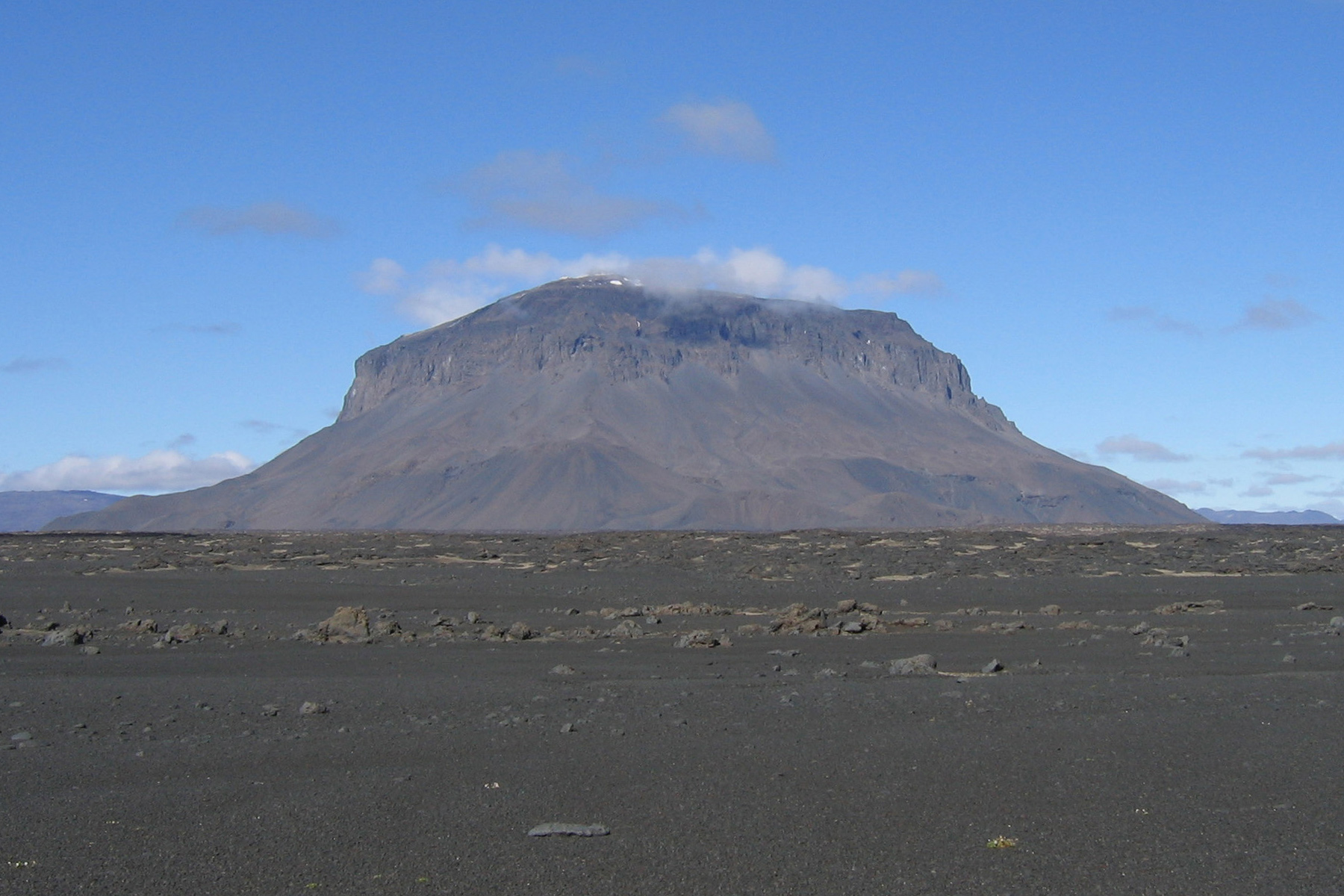
Herðubreið, a tuya in Iceland

Glaciovolcanic products have been identified in Iceland, the Canadian province of British Columbia, the U.S. states of Hawaii and Alaska, the Cascade Range of western North America, South America and even on the planet Mars. Volcanoes known to have subglacial activity include:

- Mauna Kea in tropical Hawaii. There is evidence of past subglacial eruptive activity on the volcano in the form of a subglacial deposit on its summit. The eruptions originated about 10,000 years ago, during the last ice age, when the summit of Mauna Kea was covered in ice.
- In 2008, the British Antarctic Survey reported a volcanic eruption under the Antarctica ice sheet 2,200 years ago. It is believed to be that this was the biggest eruption in Antarctica in the last 10,000 years. Volcanic ash deposits from the volcano were identified through an airborne radar survey, buried under later snowfalls in the Hudson Mountains, close to Pine Island Glacier.
- Iceland, well known for both glaciers and volcanoes, is often a site of subglacial eruptions. An example an eruption under the Vatnajökull ice cap in 1996, which occurred under an estimated 2,500 ft (762 m) of ice.
- As part of the search for life on Mars, scientists have suggested that there may be subglacial volcanoes on the red planet. Several potential sites of such volcanism have been reviewed, and compared extensively with similar features in Iceland:

Viable microbial communities have been found living in deep (−2800 m) geothermal groundwater at 349 K and pressures >300 bar. Furthermore, microbes have been postulated to exist in basaltic rocks in rinds of altered volcanic glass. All of these conditions could exist in polar regions of Mars today where subglacial volcanism has occurred.

== Phreatic ==
Diagram of a phreatic eruption. (key: 1. Water vapor cloud 2. Magma conduit 3. Layers of lava and ash 4. Stratum 5. Water table 6. Explosion 7. Magma chamber)

Phreatic eruptions (or steam-blast eruptions) are a type of eruption driven by the expansion of steam. When cold ground or surface water come into contact with hot rock or magma it superheats and explodes, fracturing the surrounding rock and thrusting out a mixture of steam, water, ash, volcanic bombs, and volcanic blocks. The distinguishing feature of phreatic explosions is that they only blast out fragments of pre-existing solid rock from the volcanic conduit; no new magma is erupted. Because they are driven by the cracking of rock strata under pressure, phreatic activity does not always result in an eruption; if the rock face is strong enough to withstand the explosive force, outright eruptions may not occur, although cracks in the rock will probably develop and weaken it, furthering future eruptions.

Often a precursor of future volcanic activity, phreatic eruptions are generally weak, although there have been exceptions. Some phreatic events may be triggered by earthquake activity, another volcanic precursor, and they may also travel along dike lines. Phreatic eruptions form base surges, lahars, avalanches, and volcanic block "rain." They may also release deadly toxic gas able to suffocate anyone in range of the eruption.

Volcanoes known to exhibit phreatic activity include:

- Mount St. Helens, which exhibited phreatic activity just prior to its catastrophic 1980 eruption (which was itself Plinian).
- Taal Volcano, Philippines, 1965 2020
- La Soufrière of Guadeloupe (Lesser Antilles), 1975–1976 activity.
- Soufrière Hills volcano on Montserrat, West Indies, 1995–2012.
- Poás Volcano, has frequent geyser like phreatic eruptions from its crater lake.
- Mount Bulusan, well known for its sudden phreatic eruptions.
- Mount Ontake, all historical eruptions of this volcano have been phreatic including the deadly 2014 eruption.
- Mount Kerinci, Indonesia, produces almost annual phreatic eruptions.

== See also ==
- List of volcanic eruptions in the 21st century
- List of Quaternary volcanic eruptions
- Prediction of volcanic activity – Research to predict volcanic activity
- Timeline of volcanism on Earth
