= Volcanic plume =

Volcanic plume or volcanic plume may refer to:

- Eruption plume, a column of hot volcanic ash and gas emitted into the atmosphere during an explosive volcanic eruption
- Mantle plume, an upwelling of abnormally hot rock within the Earth's mantle, which can cause volcanic hotspots
