= Volcanologist =

Scientist who studies volcanoes

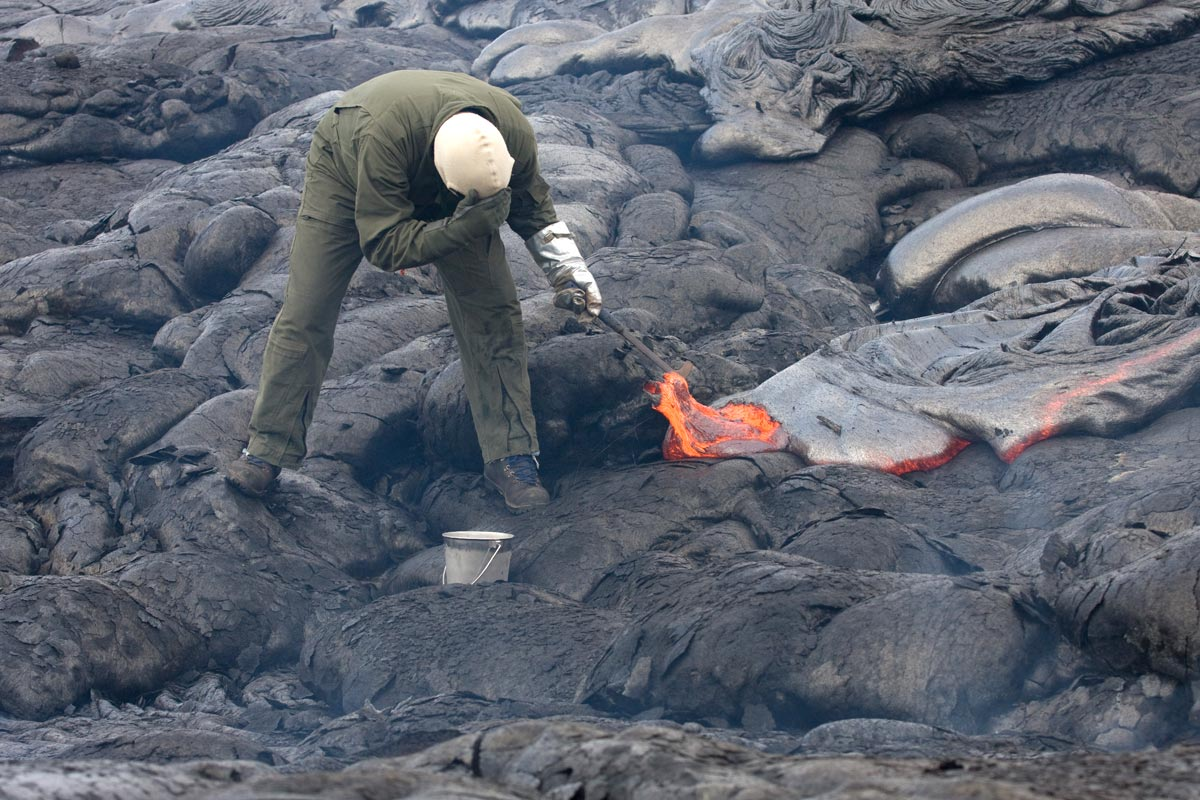
A volcanologist sampling lava using a rock hammer and a bucket of water

A volcanologist, or volcano scientist, is a geologist who focuses on understanding the formation and eruptive activity of volcanoes. Volcanologists frequently visit volcanoes, sometimes active ones, to observe and monitor volcanic eruptions, collect eruptive products including tephra (such as ash or pumice), rock and lava samples. One major focus of inquiry in recent times is the prediction of eruptions to alleviate the impact on surrounding populations and monitor natural hazards associated with volcanic activity. Geologists who research volcanic materials that make up the solid Earth are referred to as igneous petrologists.

== Etymology ==
The word volcanologist (or vulcanologist) is derived from the English volcanology (volcano + -logy), which was derived from the French volcanologie (or vulcanologie), which was further derived from the French word volcan (volcano), which was even further derived from Vulcanus, the Latin name of the Roman god of fire and metalworking. The Latin word is of Etruscan origin, but unknown meaning.

== Job overview ==
=== Job Description ===
Volcanologists research many aspects of volcanic processes to better understand planetary formation or to monitor current and future volcanic eruptions in order to protect citizens living in volcanic hazard zones. Volcanologists work at universities, museums or other national research institutes (often including volcano observatories), or in industry. Volcanologists working in academia will be usually involved in teaching geology classes if based at a university (lecturer or professor), running of laboratory experiments, data collection, and writing of scientific peer-reviewed papers for the scientific community to critique and advance knowledge and discovery. Volcanologists working for volcano observatories and museums work in close collaboration with academic researchers, but day-to-day tasks may also include the collection and curation of volcanic samples, writing of reports from monitoring stations, and public outreach relating to volcanic hazards and climate change

=== Sub-disciplines of volcanology ===
- Igneous petrologist
- Physical volcanogist - someone who typically studies the physical characteristics of volcanic ash deposits and rocks.
- Experimental petrologist - someone who simulates volcanic and magmatic processes in a laboratory (are often specialists in thermodynamics applied to Earth processes).
- Geochemist - those who study the chemical composition of volcanic rocks and gases (see also isotope geochemistry). Geochemists often use mass spectrometry and electron microprobe analysis to understand the pre-eruption history of volcanic rocks and how fast eruptions occur.
- Volcano geophysicist (or volcano seismologist)
- Planetary volcanologist - someone who studies volcanic processes on other planetary bodies.

== History ==
Volcanology has an extensive history. The earliest known recording of a volcanic eruption may be on a wall painting dated to about 7,000 BCE found at the Neolithic site at Çatal Höyük in Anatolia, Turkey. This painting has been interpreted as a depiction of an erupting volcano, with a cluster of houses below shows a twin peaked volcano in eruption, with a town at its base (though archaeologists now question this interpretation). The volcano may be either Hasan Dağ, or its smaller neighbour, Melendiz Dağ.

=== Ancient mythology ===
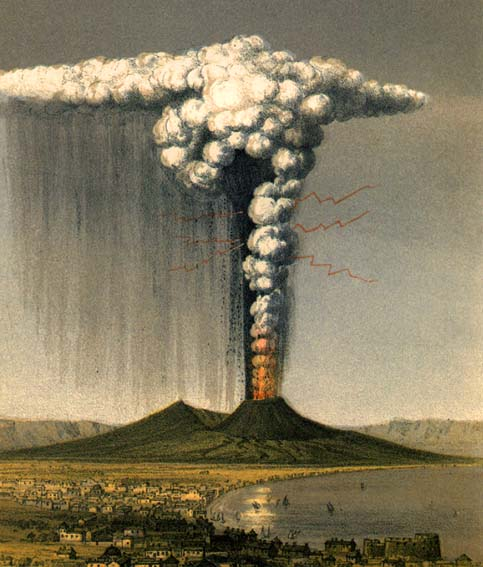
Eruption of Vesuvius in 1822. The eruption of CE 79 would have appeared very similar.

The classical world of Greece and the early Roman Empire explained volcanoes as sites of various gods. Ancient myths held that the giant Enceladus was buried beneath Etna by the goddess Athena as punishment for rebellion against the gods. Roman poet Virgil, in the Aeneid, associated the mountain's rumblings with the tormented cries of Enceladus, the flames his breath and the tremors his railing against the bars of his prison. Euripides considered that Hephaestus, the god of fire, sat below the volcano Etna, forging the weapons of Zeus. Aeschylus considered Etna as the place where Typhon, who battled Zeus in the Titanomachy, was imprisoned. Diodorus Siculus when discussing the eruption of Etna of 425 BCE, associated the event with the abduction of Persephone.

=== Greco-Roman philosophy ===
The Greek philosopher Empedocles (c. 490-430 BCE) saw the world divided into the four classical elements: earth, air, fire and water. Plato contended that channels of hot and cold waters flow through subterranean rivers. In the depths of the earth, a vast river of fire, the Pyriphlegethon, would feed all the world's volcanoes. In Meteorology, Aristotle considered Earth as a living creature with convulsins and spasms. He considered underground fire as the result of "the...friction of the wind when it plunges into narrow passages."

Wind played a key role in volcano explanations until the 16th century after Anaxagoras, in the fifth century BC, had proposed eruptions were caused by a great wind. Lucretius, a Roman philosopher, claimed Etna was completely hollow and the fires of the underground driven by a fierce wind circulating near sea level. Ovid believed that the flame was fed from "fatty foods" and eruptions stopped when the food ran out. Vitruvius contended that sulfur, alum and bitumen fed the deep fires. Observations by Pliny the Elder noted the presence of earthquakes preceded an eruption; he died in the eruption of Vesuvius in 79 CE while investigating it at Stabiae. His nephew, Pliny the Younger, gave detailed descriptions of the eruption in which his uncle died, attributing his death to the effects of toxic gases. Such eruptions have been named Plinian in honour of the two authors.

=== Middle Ages ===
Thirteenth century Dominican scholar Restoro d'Arezzo devoted two entire chapters (11.6.4.6 and 11.6.4.7) of his seminal treatise La composizione del mondo colle sue cascioni to the origin of the endogenous energy of the Earth. Restoro maintained that the interior of the Earth was very hot and insisted, following Empedocles, that the Earth had a molten center and that volcanoes erupted through the rise of molten rock to the surface.

=== Renaissance observations ===
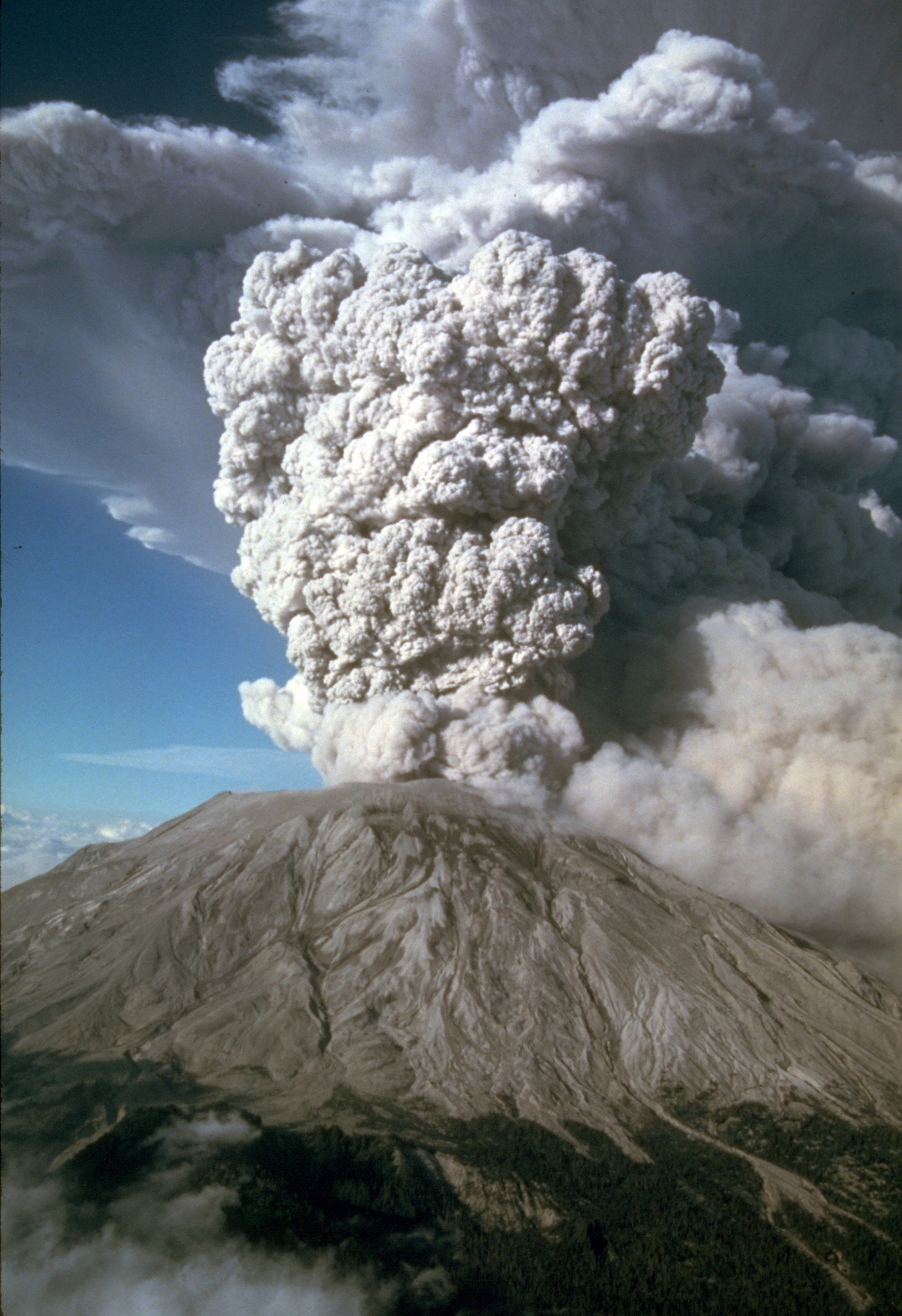
After the first eruption of Mount St. Helens on May 18, five more explosive eruptions occurred in 1980, including this event on July 22. This eruption sent pumice and ash 6 to 11 miles (10-18 kilometers) into the air, and was visible in Seattle, Washington, 100 miles (160 kilometers) to the north. The view here is from the south.

During the Renaissance, observers as Bernard Palissy, Conrad Gessner, and Johannes Kentmann (1518–1568) showed a deep intense interest in the nature, behavior, origin and history of the terrestrial globe. Many theories of volcanic action were framed during the late sixteenth mid-seventeenth centuries. Georgius Agricola argued the rays of the sun, as later proposed by Descartes had nothing to do with volcanoes. Agricola believed vapor under pressure caused eruptions of 'mointain oil' and basalt. Johannes Kepler considered volcanoes as conduits for the tears and excrement of the Earth, voiding bitumen, tar and sulfur. Descartes, pronouncing that God had created the Earth in an instant, declared he had done so in three layers; the fiery depths, a layer of water, and the air. Volcanoes, he said, were formed where the rays of the sun pierced the earth.

The volcanoes of southern Italy attracted naturalists ever since the Renaissance led to the rediscovery of Classical descriptions of them by wtiters like Lucretius and Strabo. Vesuvius, Stromboli and Vulcano provided an opportunity to study the nature of volcanic phenomena. Italian natural philosophers living within reach of these volcanoes wrote long and learned books on the subject: Giovanni Alfonso Borelli's account of the eruption of Mount Etna in 1669 became a standard source of information, as did Giulio Cesare Recupito's account of the 1631 eruption of Mount Vesuvius (1632 and later editions) and Francesco Serao's account of the eruption of Vesuvius in 1737 (1737, with editions in French and English).

The Jesuit Athanasius Kircher (1602–1680) witnessed eruptions of Mount Etna and Stromboli, then visited the crater of Vesuvius and published his view of an Earth with a central fire connected to numerous others caused by the burning of sulfur, bitumen and coal. He published his view of this in Mundus Subterraneus with volcanoes acting as a type of safety valve.

The causes of these phenomena were discussed in the large number of theories of the Earth that were published in the hundred years after 1650. The authors of these theories were not themselves observers, but combined the observations of others with Newtonian, Cartesian, Biblical or animistic science to produce a variety of all-embracing systems. Volcanic eruptions and earthquakes were generally linked in these systems to the existence of great open caverns under the Earth where inflammable vapours could accumulate until they were ignited. According to Thomas Burnet, much of the Earth itself was inflammable, with pitch, coal and brimstone all ready to burn. In William Whiston's theory the presence of underground air was necessary if ignition were to take place, while John Woodward stressed that water was essential. Athanasius Kircher maintained that the caverns and sources of the heat were deep, and reached down towards the centre of the Earth, while other writers, notably Georges Buffon, believed they were relatively superficial, and that volcanic fires were seated well up within the volcanic cone itself. A number of writers, most notably Thomas Robinson, believed that the Earth was an animal, and that its internal heat, earthquakes and eruptions were all signs of life. This animistic philosophy was waning by the end of the seventeenth century, but traces continued well into the eighteenth. Science wrestled with the ideas of the combustion of pyrite with water, that rock was solidified bitumen, and with notions of rock being formed from water (Neptunism). Of the volcanoes then known, all were near the water, hence the action of the sea upon the land was used to explain volcanism.

=== Interaction with religion and mythology ===
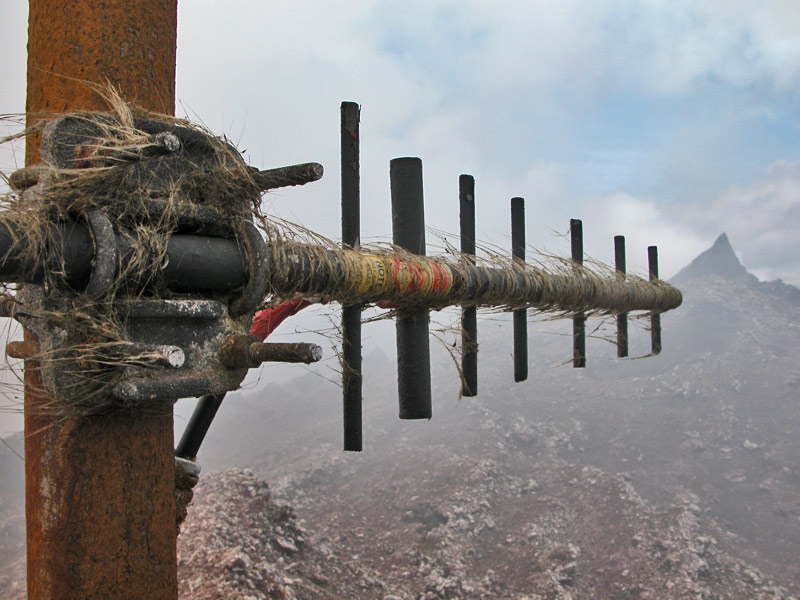
Pele's hair caught on a radio antenna mounted on the south rim of Puʻu ʻŌʻō, Hawaiʻi, July 22, 2005

Tribal legends of volcanoes abound from the Pacific Ring of Fire and the Americas, usually invoking the forces of the supernatural or the divine to explain the violent outbursts of volcanoes. Taranaki and Tongariro, according to Māori mythology, were lovers who fell in love with Pihanga, and a spiteful jealous fight ensued. Some Māori will not to this day live on the direct line between Tongariro and Taranaki for fear of the dispute flaring up again. In the Hawaiian religion, Pele (/ˈpeɪleɪ/ Pel-a; [ˈpɛlɛ]) is the goddess of volcanoes and a popular figure in Hawaiian mythology. Pele was used for various scientific terms as for Pele's hair, Pele's tears, and Limu o Pele (Pele's seaweed). A volcano on the Jovian moon Io is also named Pele.

Saint Agatha is patron saint of Catania, close to mount Etna, and an important highly venerated (till today) example of virgin martyrs of Christian antiquity. In 253 CE, one year after her violent death, the stilling of an eruption of Mt. Etna was attributed to her intercession. Catania was however nearly completely destroyed by the eruption of Mt. Etna in 1169, and over 15,000 of its inhabitants died. Nevertheless, the saint was invoked again for the 1669 Etna eruption and, for an outbreak that was endangering the town of Nicolosi in 1886. The way the saint is invoked and dealt with in Italian folk religion, in a quid pro quo manner, or bargaining approach which is sometimes used in prayerful interactions with saints, has been related (in the tradition of James Frazer) to earlier pagan beliefs and practices.

In 1660 the eruption of Vesuvius rained twinned pyroxene crystals and ash upon the nearby villages. The crystals resembled the crucifix and this was interpreted as the work of Saint Januarius. In Naples, the relics of St Januarius are paraded through town at every major eruption of Vesuvius. The register of these processions and the 1779 and 1794 diary of Father Antonio Piaggio allowed British diplomat and amateur naturalist Sir William Hamilton to provide a detailed chronology and description of Vesuvius' eruptions.

== Notable volcanologists (currently active) ==
- Haraldur Sigurdsson (1939-), Icelandic volcanologist and geochemist
- Bill McGuire (born 1954)
- Keith Rowley (born 1949; Prime Minister of Trinidad and Tobago since 2015)
- Robert Stephen John Sparks (born 1949), Chaning Wills Professor of Geology in the Department of Earth Sciences at the University of Bristol.
- Donald B. Dingwell (born 1958 in Corner Brook, Newfoundland, Canada) is a geoscientist, the director of the Department of Earth and Environmental Sciences and Ordinarius for Mineralogy and Petrology of LMU Munich
- Katharine Cashman is an American volcanologist, professor of volcanology at the University of Bristol
- Terry Plank an American geochemist, volcanologist and professor of Earth science at Columbia College, Columbia University, and the Lamont Doherty Earth Observatory
- Richard Arculus is an Australian petrologist and volcanologist, formerly a professor of the School of Earth Sciences at the Australian National University.
- Rosaly Lopes (born 8 January 1957 in Rio de Janeiro, Brazil) is a senior scientist at NASA's Jet Propulsion Laboratory specializing in planetary geology and volcanology
- Clive Oppenheimer (born 1964) is a British volcanologist, and professor of volcanology in the Department of Geography of the University of Cambridge
- Jonathan Fink (born 1951) is professor of geology at Portland State University known for studies of physical processes in volcanology
- Tamsin Mather ia a British professor of earth sciences at the Department of Earth Sciences, University of Oxford. She studies volcanic processes and their impacts on the Earth's environment and has appeared on the television and radio
- Marie Edmonds (born 14 September 1975) is a professor of volcanology and geology at the University of Cambridge whose research focuses on the physics and chemistry of volcanic eruptions and magmatism and understanding volatile cycling in the solid Earth as mediated by plate tectonics
- Jani Radebaugh American planetary scientist and professor of geology at Brigham Young University
- Lindy Elkins-Tanton, planetary scientist and professor with expertise in planet formation and evolution. She is the director of the School of Earth and Space Exploration at Arizona State University (ASU) in Tempe, Arizona, Principal Investigator of NASA's Psyche mission, and former director of the Carnegie Institution for Science's Department of Terrestrial Magnetism.
- Jenni Barclay, professor of volcanology at the University of Bristol. She works on ways to mitigate volcanic risks, the interactions between rainfall and volcanic activity and the communication of volcanic hazards in the Caribbean
- Claire Horwell, professor of geohealth in the Department of Earth Sciences and Institute of Hazard, Risk and Resilience at Durham University and the founding director of the International Volcanic Health Hazard Network (IVHHN). She studies the health hazards of natural and industrial mineral dusts

== Notable volcanologists ==
- Pliny the Elder (23–79 AD)
- Pliny the Younger (61 – c. 113 AD)
- George-Louis Leclerc, Comte de Buffon (1707–1788)
- James Hutton (1726–1797)
- Déodat Gratet de Dolomieu (1750–1801)
- George Julius Poulett Scrope (1797–1876)
- Giuseppe Mercalli (1850–1914)
- Pope Pius XI (1857–1939), Catholic pope who, in his early life as Achille Ratti, wrote a chapter on earthquakes in an authoritative book "Vulcani e fenomeni vulcanici in Italia" ("Volcanoes and volcanic phenomena in Italy") co-authored with Giuseppe Mercalli, published in 1883
- Alfred Lacroix (1863–1948)
- Frank A. Perret (1867–1943)
- Thomas Jaggar (1871–1953), founder of the Hawaiian Volcano Observatory
- Alfred Rittmann (1893–1980)
- Howel Williams (1898–1980)
- Gordon A. Macdonald (1911–1978)
- Sigurður Þórarinsson (1912–1983)
- Haroun Tazieff (1914–1998), advisor to the French Government and Jacques Cousteau
- George P. L. Walker (1926–2005), pioneering volcanologist who transformed the subject into a quantitative science
- Katia and Maurice Krafft (1942–1991 and 1946–1991, respectively), died at Mount Unzen in Japan, 1991
- Peter Francis (1944–1999)
- David A. Johnston (1949–1980), killed during the 1980 eruption of Mount St. Helens
- Harry Glicken (1958–1991), died at Mount Unzen in Japan by pyroclastic flow, 1991
- Bruce Houghton (1950-)

== See also ==
- Volcanology
- Volcanism
- Igneous Petrology
