= Limu o Pele =

Type of volcanic glass

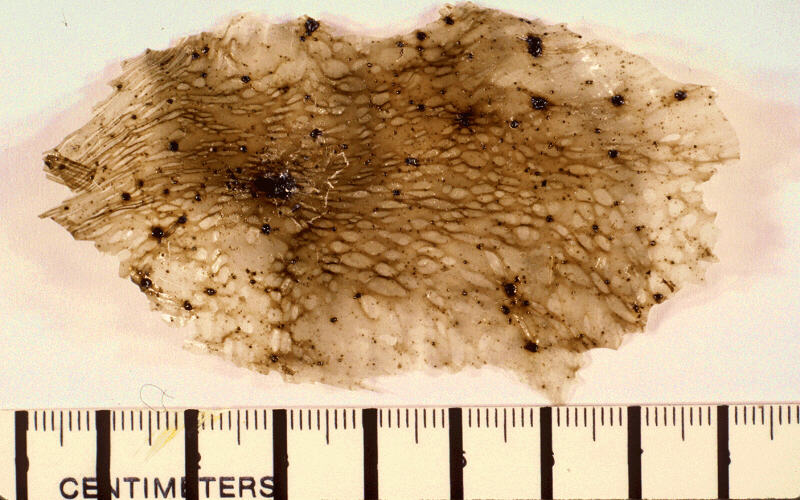
Closeup picture of a Limu o Pele volcanic sheet glass fragment.

Limu o Pele or Pele's seaweed (Hawaiian, literally "seaweed of Pele" after Pele the Hawaiian fire goddess of volcanoes) is a geological term for thin sheets and subsequently shattered flakes of brownish-green to near-colorless volcanic glass lava spatter, commonly resembling seaweed in appearance, that have been erupted from a volcano. Limu o Pele is formed when water is forced into and trapped inside lava, as when waves wash over the top of the exposed flows of the molten rock. The water boils and is instantly converted to steam, expanding to form bubbles within the lava. The lava rapidly cools and solidifies as the bubbles grow. The volcanic glass bubbles burst and are dispersed by the wind, showering flakes of glass downwind.

Limu o Pele has been found around subaerial littoral volcanic cones and also at submarine volcanoes, for example, on the summit of Kamaʻehuakanaloa (formerly Lōʻihi) seamount.

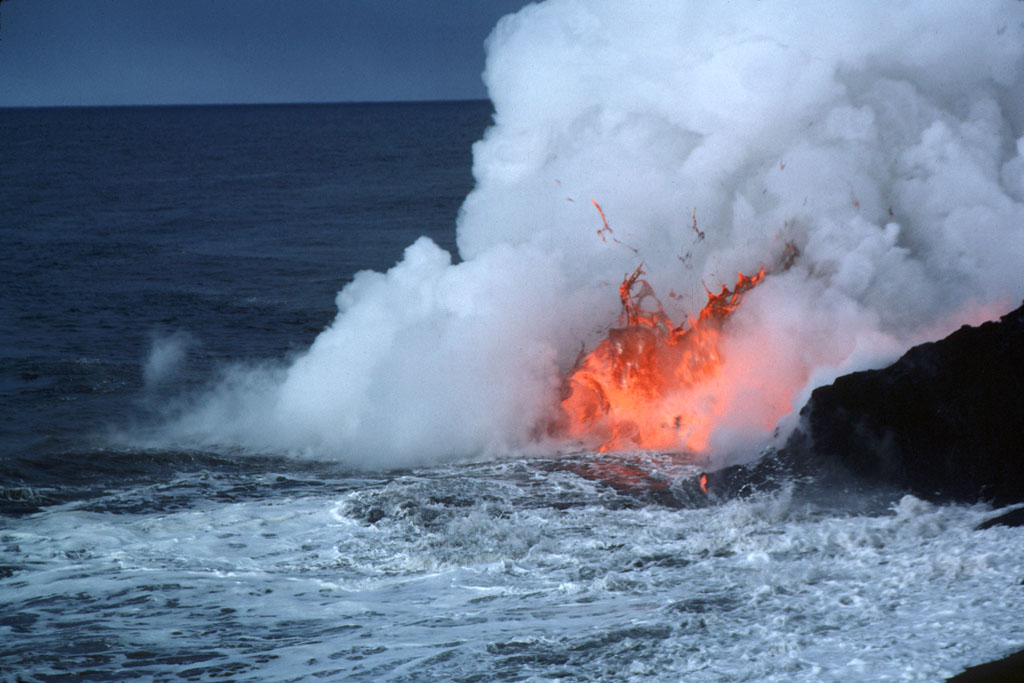
Limu o Pele forming during littoral eruption of Kilauea volcano, Hawaii

== See also ==
- Pele's hair
- Pele's tears
