= Volcanic glass =

Naturally occurring material

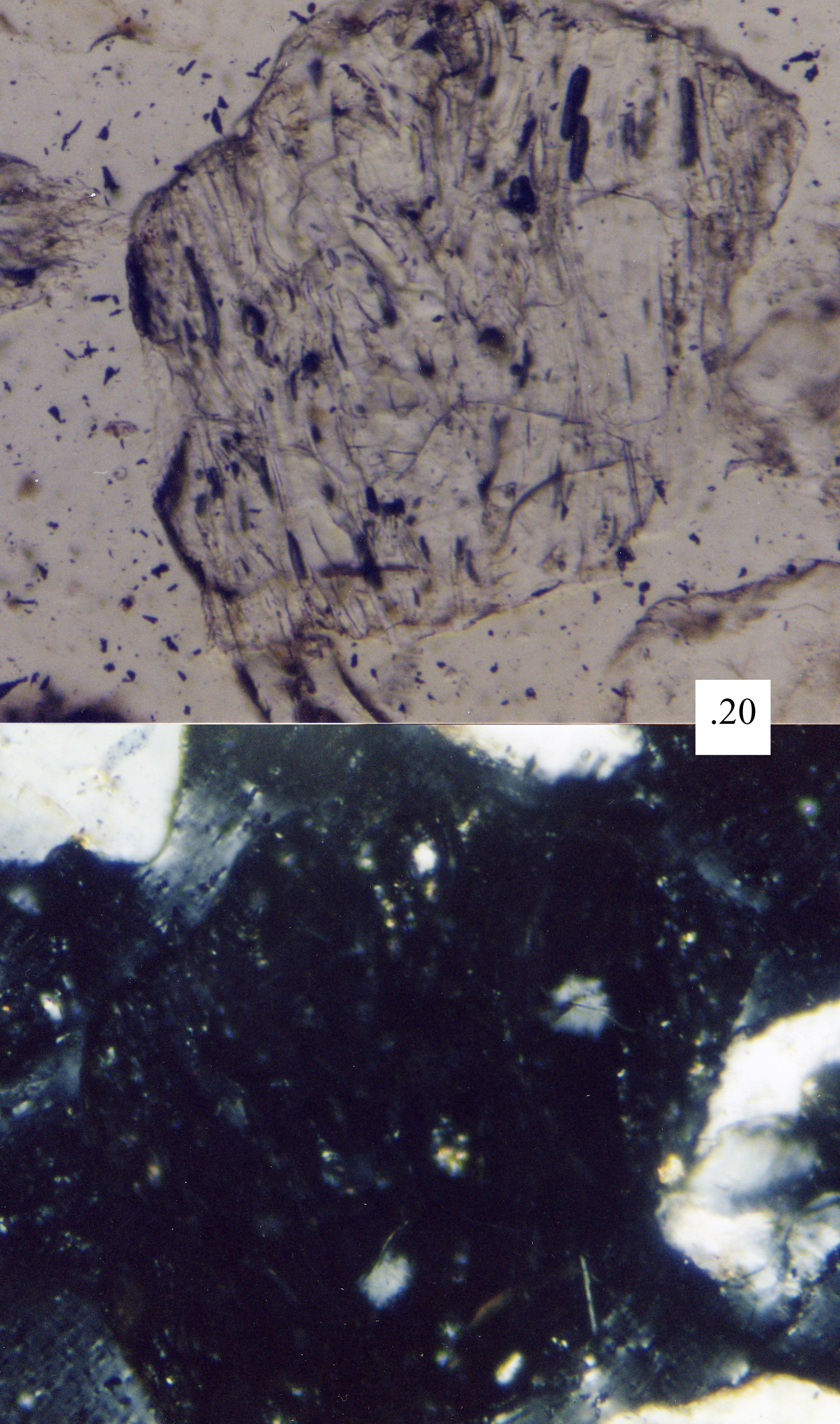
A sand grain of volcanic glass under the petrographic microscope. Its amorphous nature makes it disappear in cross-polarized light (bottom frame). The scale box is in millimeters.

Volcanic glass is the amorphous (non-crystalline) product of rapidly cooling magma. Like all types of glass, it is a state of matter intermediate between the closely packed, highly ordered array of a crystal and the highly disordered array of liquid. Volcanic glass may refer to the interstitial material, or matrix, in an aphanitic (fine-grained) volcanic rock, or to any of several types of vitreous igneous rocks.

== Origin ==
Volcanic glass is formed when magma is rapidly cooled. Magma rapidly cooled to below its normal crystallization temperature becomes a supercooled liquid, and, with further rapid cooling, this becomes an amorphous solid. The change from supercooled liquid to glass occurs at a temperature called the glass transition temperature, which depends on both cooling rate and the amount of water dissolved in the magma. Magma rich in silica and poor in dissolved water is most easily cooled rapidly enough to form volcanic glass. As a result, rhyolite magmas, which are high in silica, can produce tephra composed entirely of volcanic glass and may also form glassy lava flows. Ash-flow tuffs typically consist of countless microscopic shards of volcanic glass. Basalt, which is low in silica, forms glass only with difficulty, so that basalt tephra almost always contains at least some crystalline material (quench crystals). The glass transition temperature of basalt is about 700 °C (1,292 °F).

The mechanisms controlling formation of volcanic glass are further illustrated by the two forms of basaltic glass, tachylite and sideromelane. Tachylite is opaque to transmitted light because of the abundance of tiny oxide mineral crystals suspended in the glass. Sideromelane is partially transparent because it contains much fewer crystals. Sideromelane is abundant only in eruptions where basalt magma has been very rapidly cooled by contact with water, such as phreatomagmatic eruptions. Basaltic volcanic glass is also present in pillow lavas.

Of the cooling mechanisms responsible for forming volcanic glass, the most effective is quenching by water, followed by cooling by entrained air in an eruption column. The least effective mechanism is cooling at the bottom of a flow in contact with the ground.

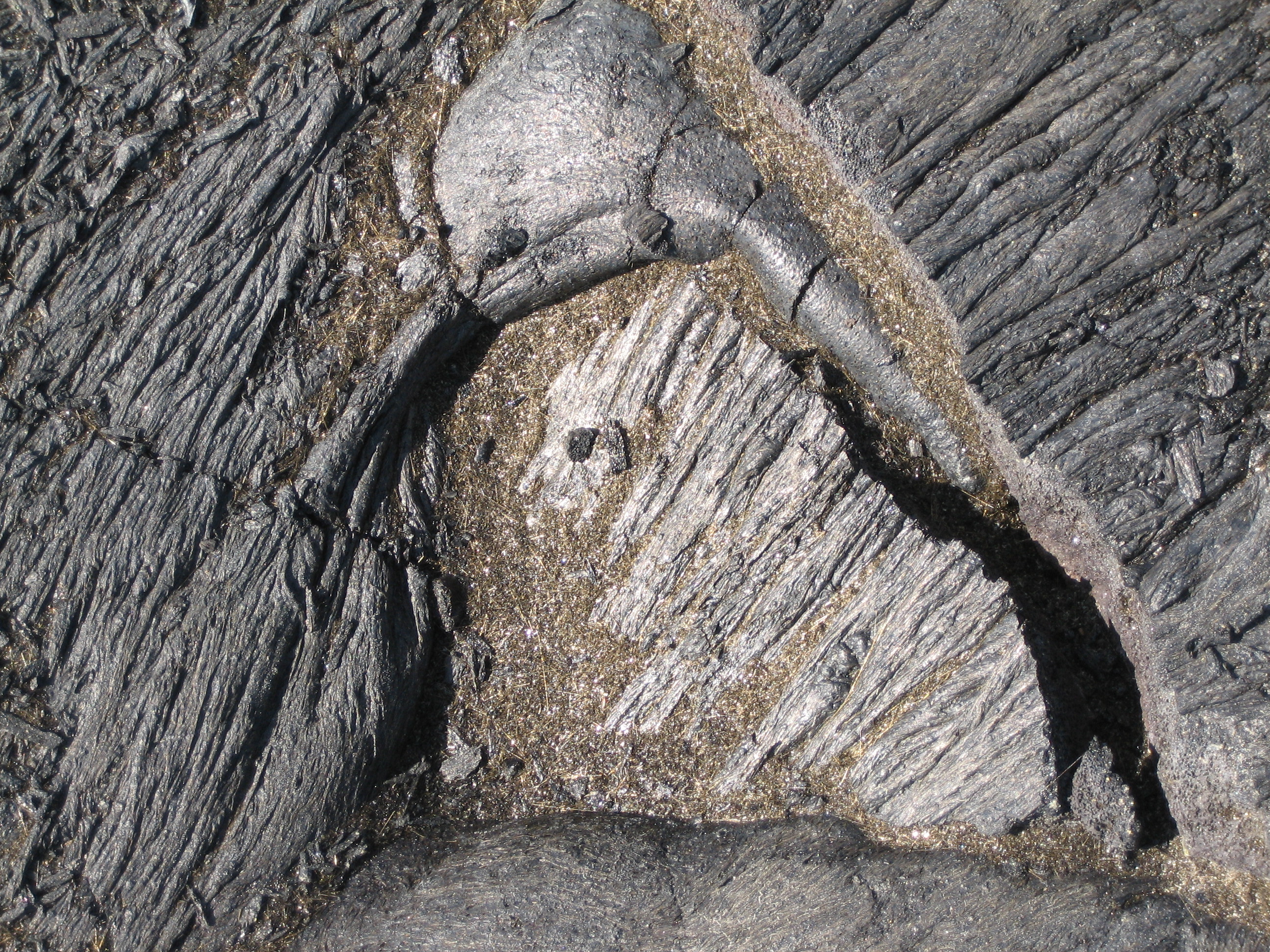
Volcanic glass (“Pele’s hair”) from Volcanoes National Park, Hawaii. Photo by Douglaspperkins, 2006. Public domain.

== Types of volcanic glass ==
- Pumice, which is considered a glass because it has no crystal structure.
- Scoria, which is the mafic to intermediate equivalent of pumice. It is typically denser and has larger vesicles.
- Apache tears, a kind of nodular obsidian.
- Tachylite (also spelled tachylyte), a basaltic glass with relatively low silica content.
- Sideromelane, a less common form of tachylyte.
- Palagonite, an alteration product of basaltic glass.
- Hyaloclastite, a hydrated tuff-like breccia of sideromelane and palagonite.
- Pele's hair, threads or fibers of volcanic glass, usually basaltic.(Show in image to the right)
- Pele's tears, tear-like drops of volcanic glass, usually basaltic.
- Limu o Pele (Pele's seaweed), thin sheets and flakes of brownish-green to near-clear volcanic glass, usually basaltic.
- Pitchstone, an acidic volcanic glass similar to obsidian, contains a higher water content.

== Alteration ==
Volcanic glass is chemically unstable and gradually breaks down over time. Because it does not have a crystal structure, water can easily react with it. This reaction removes some elements from the glass and causes new minerals to form. As a result, volcanic ash can turn into solid rock relatively quickly. In some environments, altered volcanic glass has helped form mineral deposits such as zeolite and bentonite, which have economic importance.
