= Sideromelane =

Vitreous basaltic volcanic glass

Sideromelane is a vitreous basaltic volcanic glass, usually occurring in palagonite tuff, for which it is characteristic. It is a less common form of tachylite, with which it usually occurs together; however it lacks the iron oxide crystals dispersed in the glass, and therefore appears transparent and pure, with yellow-brown color, instead of tachylite opaque black. It forms at higher temperatures and with more rapid chilling. Presence of sideromelane indicates higher temperature of the lava, and solidifying of the flow closer to the vent, probably by rapid quenching in a wet environment.

Sideromelane often forms during explosions of submarine volcanoes and subglacial volcanoes, and often occurs as fragments embedded in a palagonite matrix, forming hyaloclastite deposits. Sideromelane is a mafic rock.
