= Pele's tears =

Small pieces of solidified lava drops

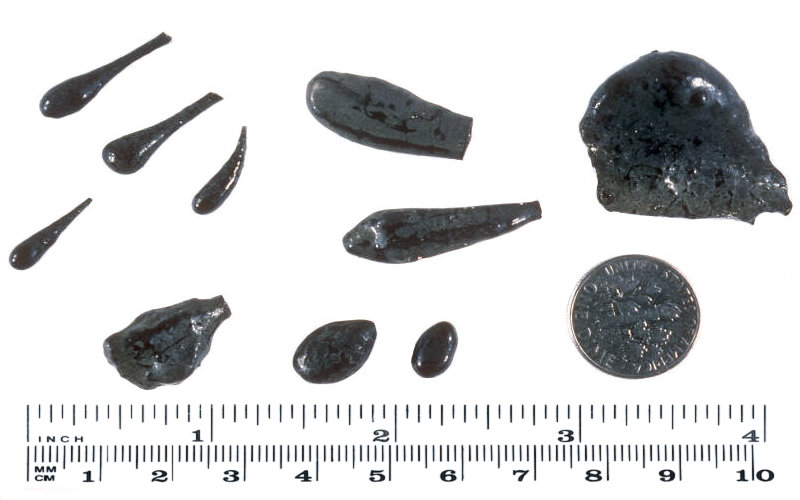
Assorted shapes of Pele's tears from Mauna Ulu. U.S. dime for scale in lower right.

Pele's tears (closest Hawaiian translation: nā waimaka o Pele) are small pieces of solidified lava drops formed when airborne particles of molten material fuse into tearlike drops of volcanic glass. Pele's tears are jet black in color and are often found on one end of a strand of Pele's hair. Pele's tears is primarily a scientific term used by volcanologists.

Pele's tears, like Pele's hair, are named after Pele, the Hawaiian goddess of volcanoes.

== Formation ==
The formation of these tears is a complex process depending on a number of different factors as a tiny droplet of lava is being erupted from a lava fountain. Whilst it is travelling through the air two things are happening: it is cooling down very rapidly (a process known as quenching) and it is being deformed. The deformation of a droplet depends on the speed at which it is erupted from the volcano, its surface tension, the viscosity (thickness) of the magma and the resistance it experiences as it travels through the air.

Pele's tears are also found entangled within fine strands of volcanic glass known as Pele's hair and it was considered that they formed together under similar conditions. Shimozura (1994) investigated this further and found that the velocity of the erupting lava was the main factor in determining whether Pele's tears or Pele's hair were formed. If the velocity of the erupting magma is high then Pele's hair is formed and if the velocity is low the formation of Pele's tears is favoured.

Under the microscope very tiny Pele's tears (less than 1 μm) can be found within the cavities of Pele's hair. This would suggest they formed prior to being trapped within the strand and supports a different mechanism for formation. It has been considered that they became trapped during transport in the eruptive plume.

== Scientific importance ==
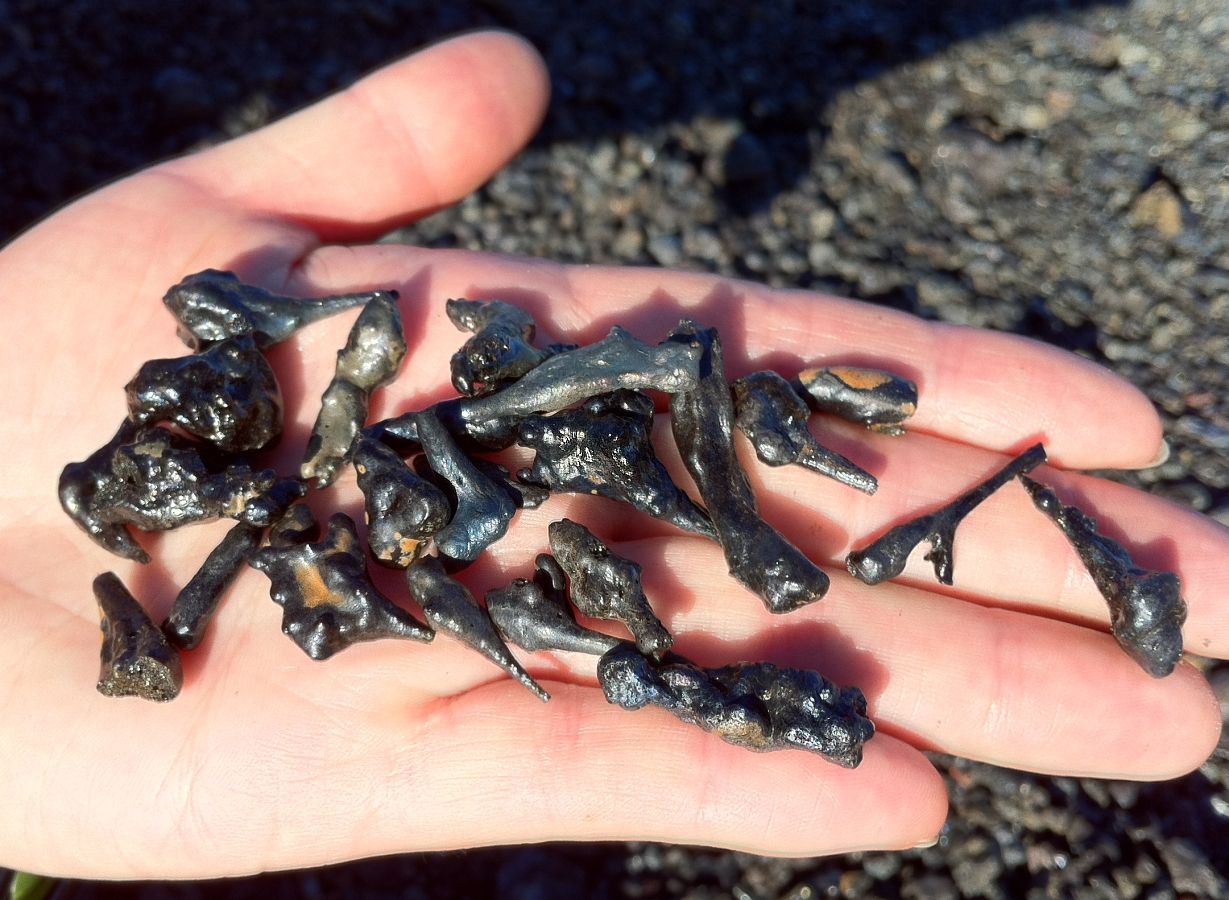
Pele's tears

Pele's tears are interesting to volcanologists because trapped within the glass droplet are bubbles of gas and particles called vesicles. When these are analyzed they can provide a great deal of information about the mechanisms of an eruption. For instance, the shape of a vesicle can provide an indication of the velocity of the eruption. When vesicles form within the lava they are spherical in shape. If the eruption is turbulent the vesicles will deform and become elongated in shape. If the velocity is low they will retain their spherical shape as in the case of Pele's tears.

The composition of a magma chamber includes lava, crystals and gases known as volatiles. At high pressures within the magma chamber, gases are dissolved in the melt and are soluble. As the magma rises, the pressure decreases and the gases come out of solution. Some of these gases escape and some become trapped in the melt. When the gases trapped within the vesicles of Pele's tears are analyzed they can provide a great deal of information about the chemical composition of the magma chamber. This information can be used to determine the explosive nature of an eruption and help to understand the complex processes occurring within volcanos. This is important in the management of natural hazards.

== See also ==
- Apache tears
- Limu o Pele
- Pele's hair
- Prince Rupert's drop
