= Apache tears =

Popular term for pebbles of obsidian

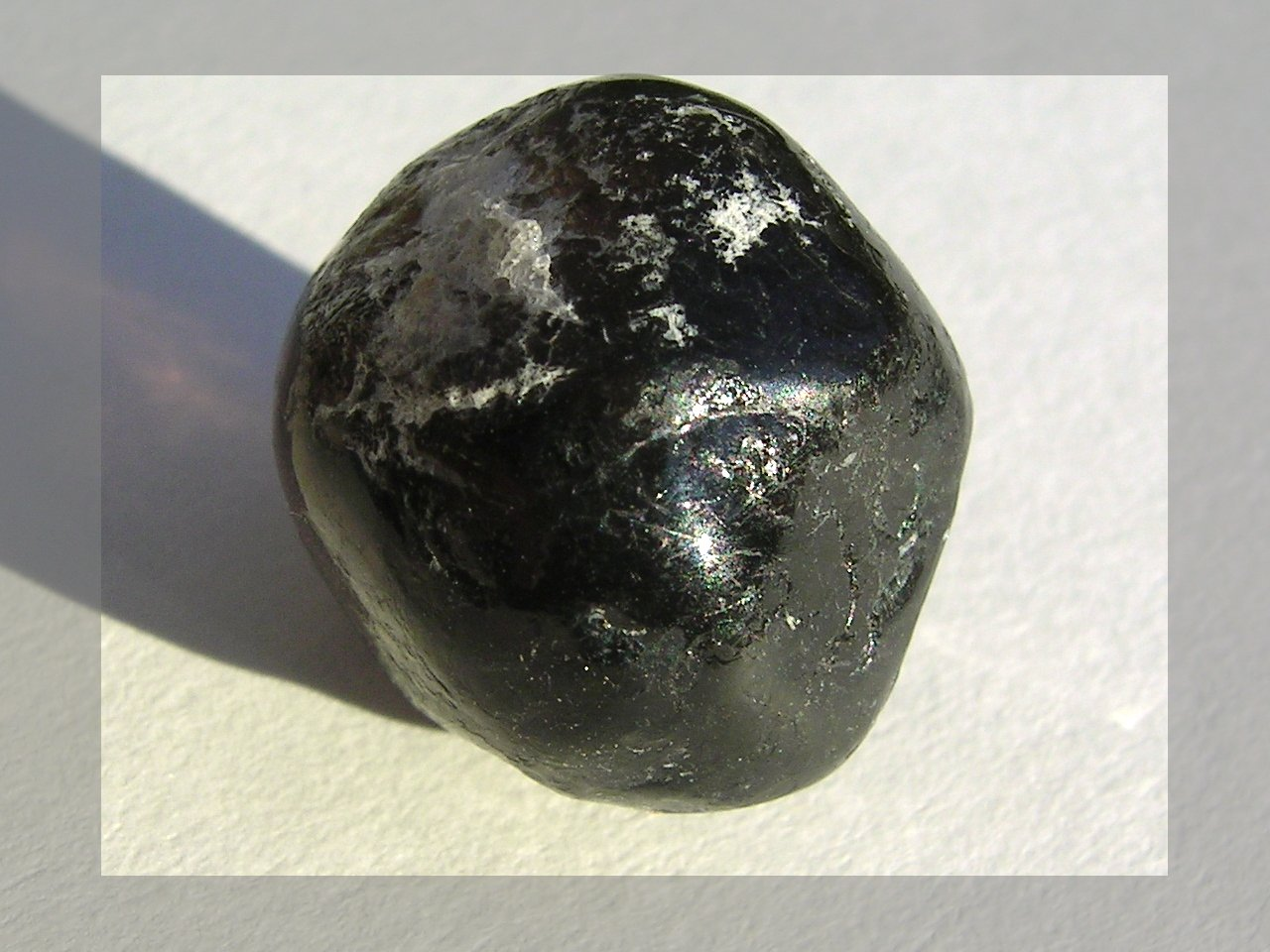
An Apache tear

Apache tears are rounded pebbles of obsidian or "obsidianites" composed of black or dark-colored natural volcanic glass, usually of rhyolitic composition and bearing conchoidal fracture. Also known by the lithologic term marekanite, this variety of obsidian occurs as subrounded to subangular bodies up to about 2 in (51 mm) in diameter, often bearing indented surfaces. Internally the pebbles sometimes contain fine bands or microlites and though in reflected light they appear black and opaque, they may be translucent in transmitted light. Apache tears fall between 5 and 5.5 in hardness on the Mohs scale.

== Geology ==
Apache tears originate from siliceous lava flows, lava domes or ash-flow tuffs, often in close association with or embedded in, gray perlite. The spherules occur as cores within perlite masses that typically exhibit texture of concentrically curved, onion-skin fractures. Formation is apparently related to differential cooling and various alkali and water contents. Excessive water present during cooling and quenching of rhyolitic lava causes obsidian to hydrate (i.e., water entering the obsidian glass converts it to perlite). Where perlite is incompletely hydrated, fresh obsidian cores remain as pebbles of marekanite, or Apache tears; this origin has been occasionally described in the geologic literature.

Apache tears are well known from tertiary volcanic terrain in numerous localities throughout the western United States, particularly Arizona, from where specimens were widely collected and sold in the lapidary and specimen trade. Several districts in western Nevada also have yielded abundant Apache tears eroding from tuff beds; such areas have been popularized in the lapidary trade through guides for rockhounds. Specimens from many of these sites have been avidly collected by rockhounds and lapidary enthusiasts, are often tumbled and may be considered semi-precious gemstones; locations are noted in the section "Gemstones of Nevada" by Rose and Ferdock.

== Culture ==
The name comes from a legend of the Apache tribe: about 75 Apaches and the US Cavalry fought on a mountain overlooking what is now Superior, Arizona, in the 1870s. Facing defeat, the outnumbered Apache warriors rode their horses off the mountain to their deaths rather than be killed. The wives and families of the warriors cried when they heard of the tragedy; their tears turned into stone upon hitting the ground.

American singer songwriter Johnny Cash wrote a song entitled "Apache Tears" for his 1964 album Bitter Tears: Ballads of the American Indian.

== See also ==
- Pele's tears
