= Peléan eruption =

Pyroclastic volcanic eruption due to a viscous siliceous magma

Peléan eruption: 1 Ash plume, 2 Volcanic ash fall, 3 Lava dome, 4 Volcanic bomb, 5 Pyroclastic flow, 6 Layers of lava and ash, 7 Stratum, 8 Magma conduit, 9 Magma chamber, 10 Dike

Peléan eruptions are a type of volcanic eruption. They can occur when viscous magma, typically of rhyolitic to andesitic type, is involved, and share some similarities with Vulcanian eruptions. The most important characteristic of a Peléan eruption is the presence of a glowing avalanche of hot volcanic ash, called a pyroclastic flow. Formation of lava domes is another characteristic. Short flows of ash or creation of pumice cones may be observed as well.

The initial phases of eruption are characterized by pyroclastic flows. The tephra deposits have lower volume and range than the corresponding Plinian and Vulcanian eruptions. The viscous magma then forms a steep-sided dome or volcanic spine in the volcano's vent. The dome may later collapse, resulting in flows of ash and hot blocks. The eruption cycle is usually completed in a few years, but in some cases may continue for decades, like in the case of Santiaguito.

The term Peléan derives from the name of Mount Pelée, a volcano on the Caribbean island of Martinique. Its eruption in 1902, with a volcanic explosivity index (VEI) of 4, was the first such event to be described.

Other examples of Peléan eruptions include:

- the 1948–1951 eruption of Hibok-Hibok; (VEI-3)
- the 1951 eruption of Mount Lamington, which remains the most detailed observation of this kind; (VEI-4)
- the 1968 eruption of Mayon Volcano (VEI-3)
- The 2021 eruption of La Soufrière (VEI-4)

== See also ==
- Plinian eruption, related to the explosive eruptions of the Mount Vesuvius
