= Pele's hair =

Clump of volcanic glass strands

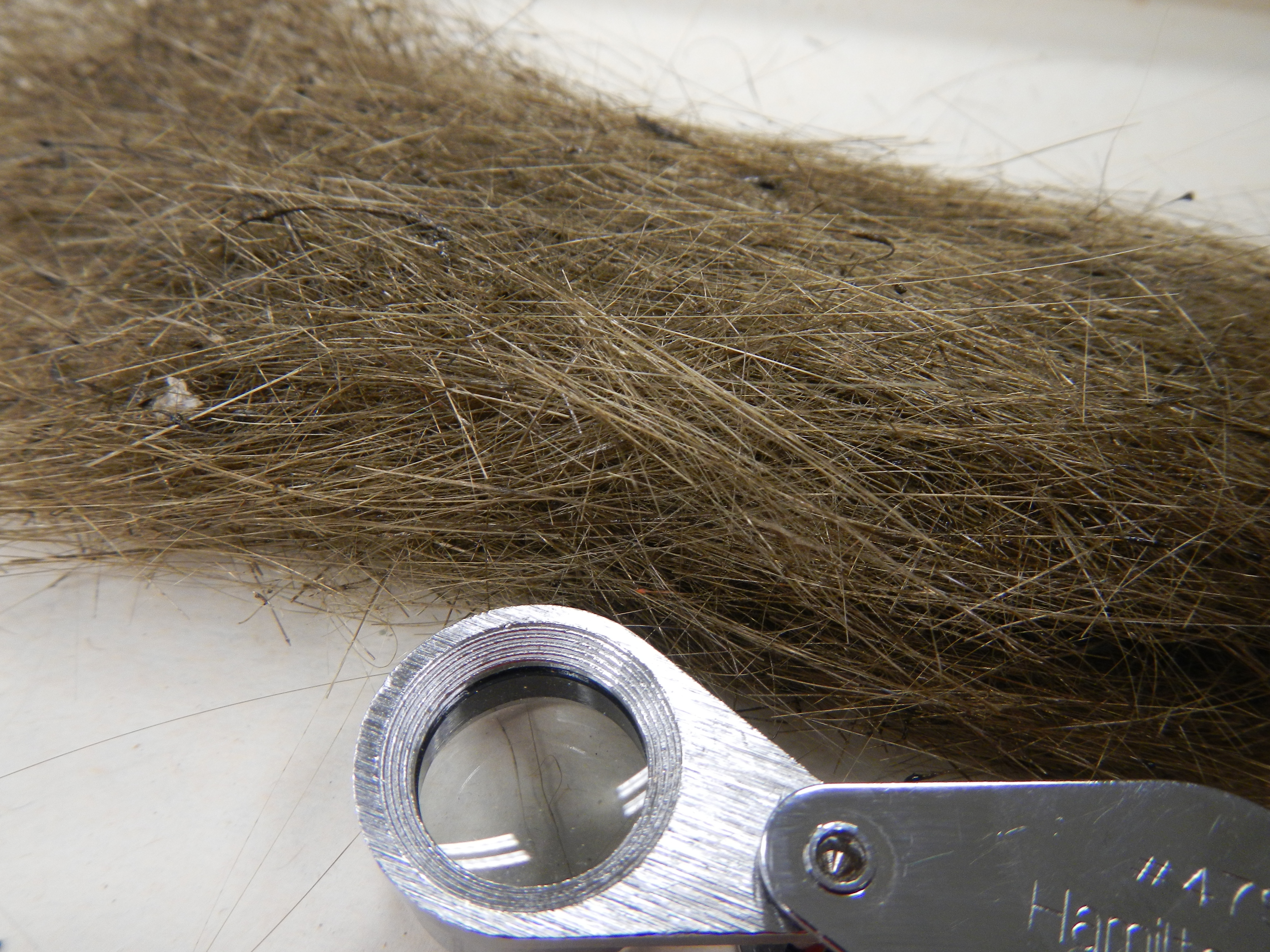
Pele's hair, with a hand lens as scale

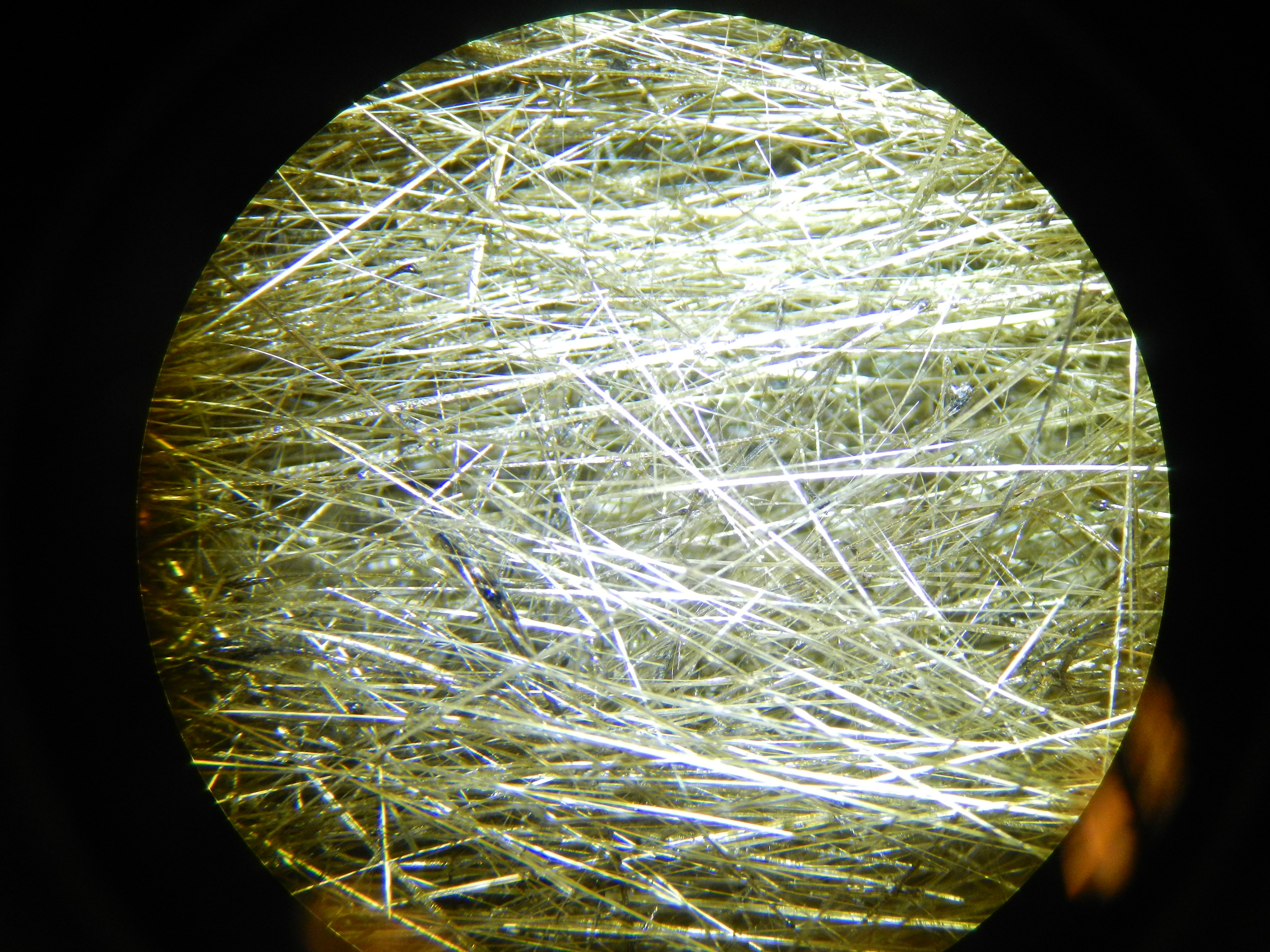
Strands of Pele's hair viewed under microscope

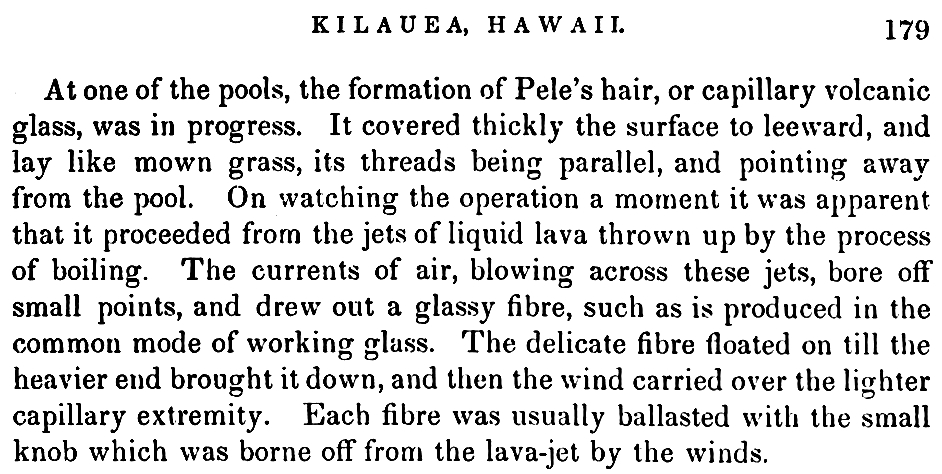
First description by J. Dana, 1849

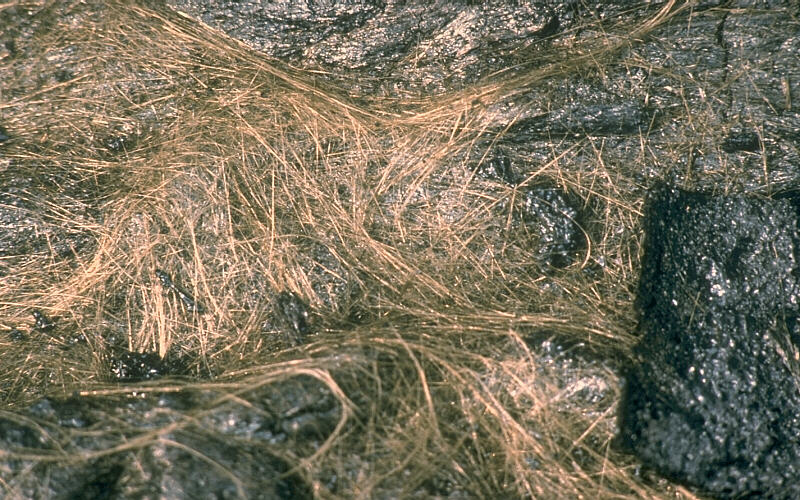
Pele's hair on a pahoehoe flow at Kīlauea Volcano, Hawaiʻi, March 27, 1984

Pele's hair is the name given to clumps of basalt fibers formed from volcanic glass when lava is stretched into thin strands during cooling, usually from lava fountains, lava cascades, or fierce lava flows. They are named after Pele, the Hawaiian goddess of volcanoes.

== Formation ==
The strands are created when molten lava is ejected into the air and form tiny droplets, which elongate perfectly straight. It usually forms in lava fountains, lava cascades, and vigorous lava flows.

== Features ==
Pele's hair has a golden yellow color and looks like human hair or dry straw. In sunlight, it has a shimmering gold color. Length varies considerably, but is typically 5 to 15 cm, and can be up to 2 m. Hair diameter ranges from about 1 to 300 μm (0.001 to 0.3 mm).

Pele's hair is very brittle and very sharp, and small broken pieces can enter the skin.

== Occurrence ==
Mentions of this type of lava can be found in 18th century Hawaiian newspapers, where it is called "Lauoho o Pele," "Lauoho Pele," and "Lauoho ehuehu a Pele."

Wind often carries the light fibers high into the air and to places several kilometers away from the vent. Strands of Pele's hair commonly gather on high places like treetops, radio antennas, and electric poles.

Pele's hair has been produced by volcanoes around the world, for example in Nicaragua (Masaya), Italy (Etna), Ethiopia (Erta’ Ale), and Iceland, where it is known as nornahár [ˈnɔ(r)tnaˌhauːr̥] ('witches' hair'). It is usually found in gaps in the ground, mostly near vents, skylights, ocean entry, or in corners where Pele's hair can accumulate.

Pele's hair may occur along with Pele's tears, small pieces of solidified lava drops. Both provide information to volcanologists about the eruption, such as the temperatures and the magma's path to the surface. Plagioclase starts to crystallize from the magma of Pele's hair at around 1,160 °C (about 2120 °F). Also, the shape of the tears can provide an indication of the velocity of the eruption, and the bubbles of gas and particles trapped within the tears can provide information about the composition of the magma chamber.

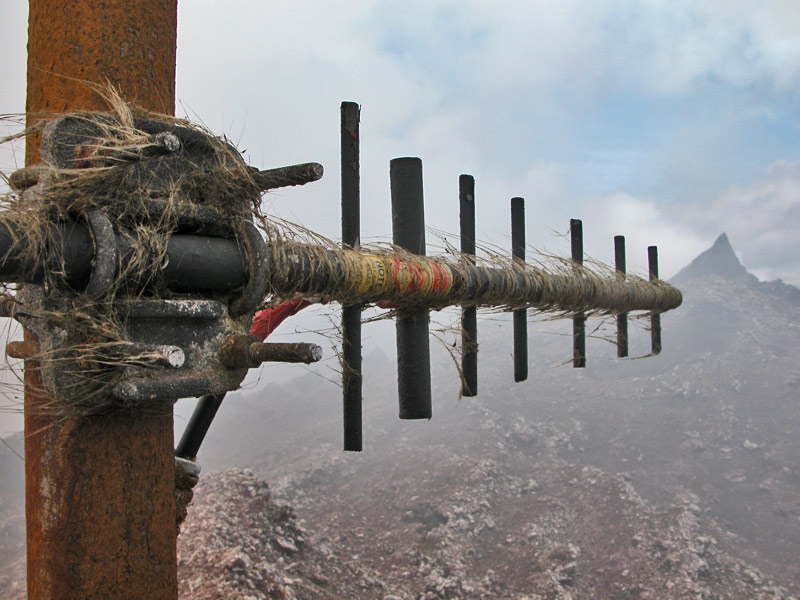
Pele's hair caught on a radio antenna mounted on the south rim of Puʻu ʻŌʻō, Hawaiʻi, July 22, 2005

== See also ==
- Basalt fiber
- Glass wool
- Mineral wool
- Limu o Pele (Pele's seaweed)
- Pele's Curse
- Pele's tears
