= Eruption column =

Cloud of hot ash and volcanic gases emitted during an explosive volcanic eruption

Satellite animation of the initial eruption column and shockwave from Hunga Tonga–Hunga Haʻapai on 15 January 2022

An eruption column or eruption plume is a cloud of super-heated ash and tephra suspended in gases emitted during an explosive volcanic eruption. The volcanic materials form a vertical column or plume that may rise many kilometers into the air above the vent of the volcano. In the most explosive eruptions, the eruption column may rise over 40 km (25 mi), penetrating the stratosphere. Injection of aerosols into the stratosphere by volcanoes is a major cause of short-term climate change.

A common occurrence in explosive eruptions is column collapse when the eruption column is or becomes too dense to be lifted high into the sky by air convection, and instead falls down the slopes of the volcano to form pyroclastic flows or surges (although the latter is less dense). On some occasions, if the material is not dense enough to fall, it may create pyrocumulonimbus clouds.

== Formation ==
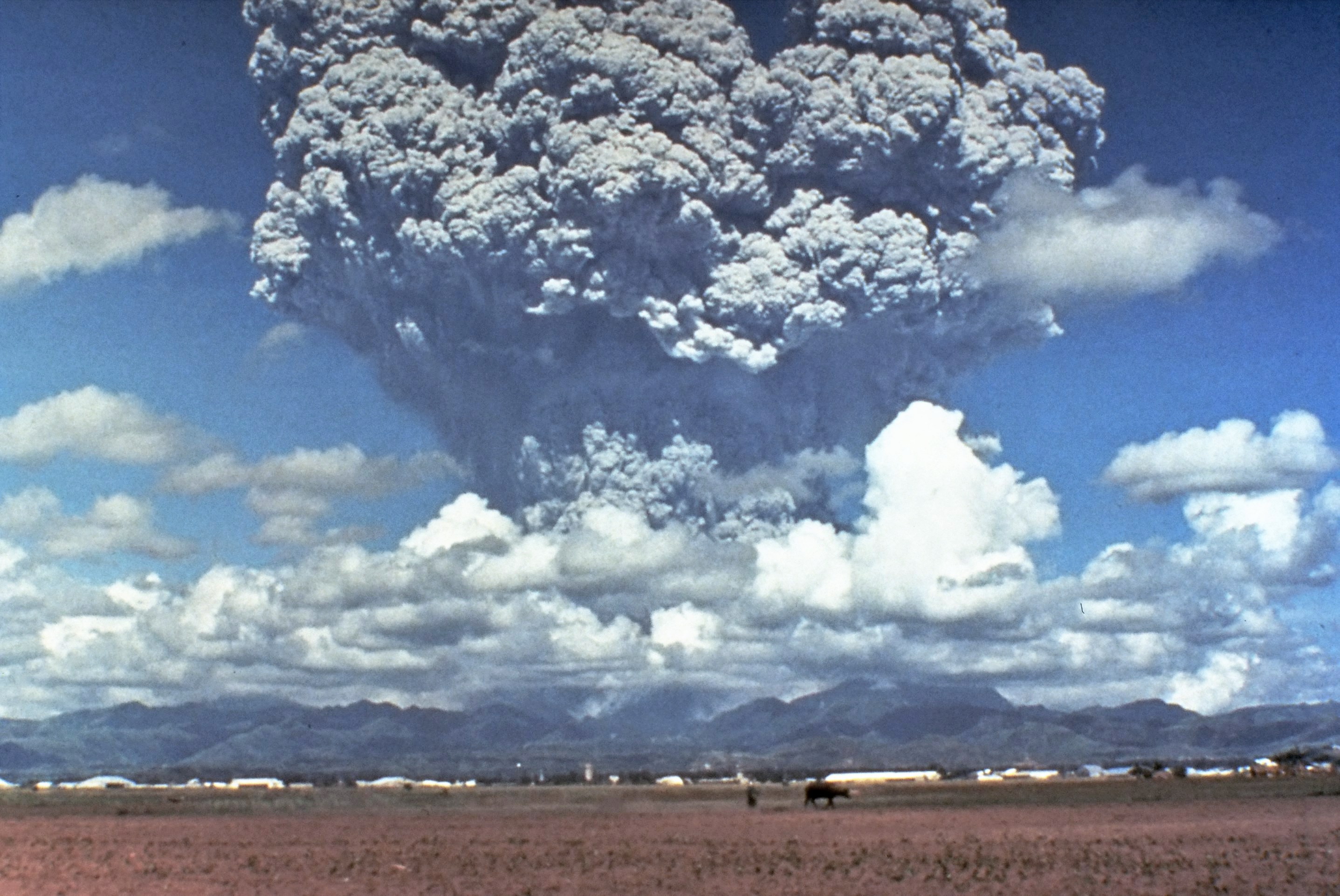
Eruption column over Mount Pinatubo in the Philippines, June 12, 1991

Eruption columns form in explosive volcanic activity, when the high concentration of volatile materials in the rising magma causes it to be disrupted into fine volcanic ash and coarser tephra. The ash and tephra are ejected at speeds of several hundred metres per second, and can rise rapidly to heights of several kilometres, lifted by enormous convection currents.

Eruption columns may be transient, if formed by a discrete explosion, or sustained, if produced by a continuous eruption or closely spaced discrete explosions.

== Structure ==
The solid and liquid materials in an eruption column are lifted by processes that vary as the material ascends:

- At the base of the column, material is violently forced upward out of the crater by the pressure of rapidly expanding gases, mainly steam. The gases expand because the pressure of rock above it rapidly reduces as it approaches the surface. This region is called the gas thrust region and typically reaches to only one or two kilometers above the vent.
- The convective thrust region covers most of the height of the column. The gas thrust region is very turbulent and surrounding air becomes mixed into it and heated. The air expands, reducing its density and rising. The rising air carries all the solid and liquid material from the eruption entrained in it upwards.
- As the column rises into less dense surrounding air, it will eventually reach an altitude where the hot, rising air is of the same density as the surrounding cold air. In this neutral buoyancy region, the erupted material will then no longer rise through convection, but solely through any upward momentum which it has. This is called the umbrella region, and is usually marked by the column spreading out sideways. The eruptive material and the surrounding cold air has the same density at the base of the umbrella region, and the top is marked by the maximum height which momentum carries the material upward. Because the speeds are very low or negligible in this region it is often distorted by stratospheric winds.

== Column heights ==
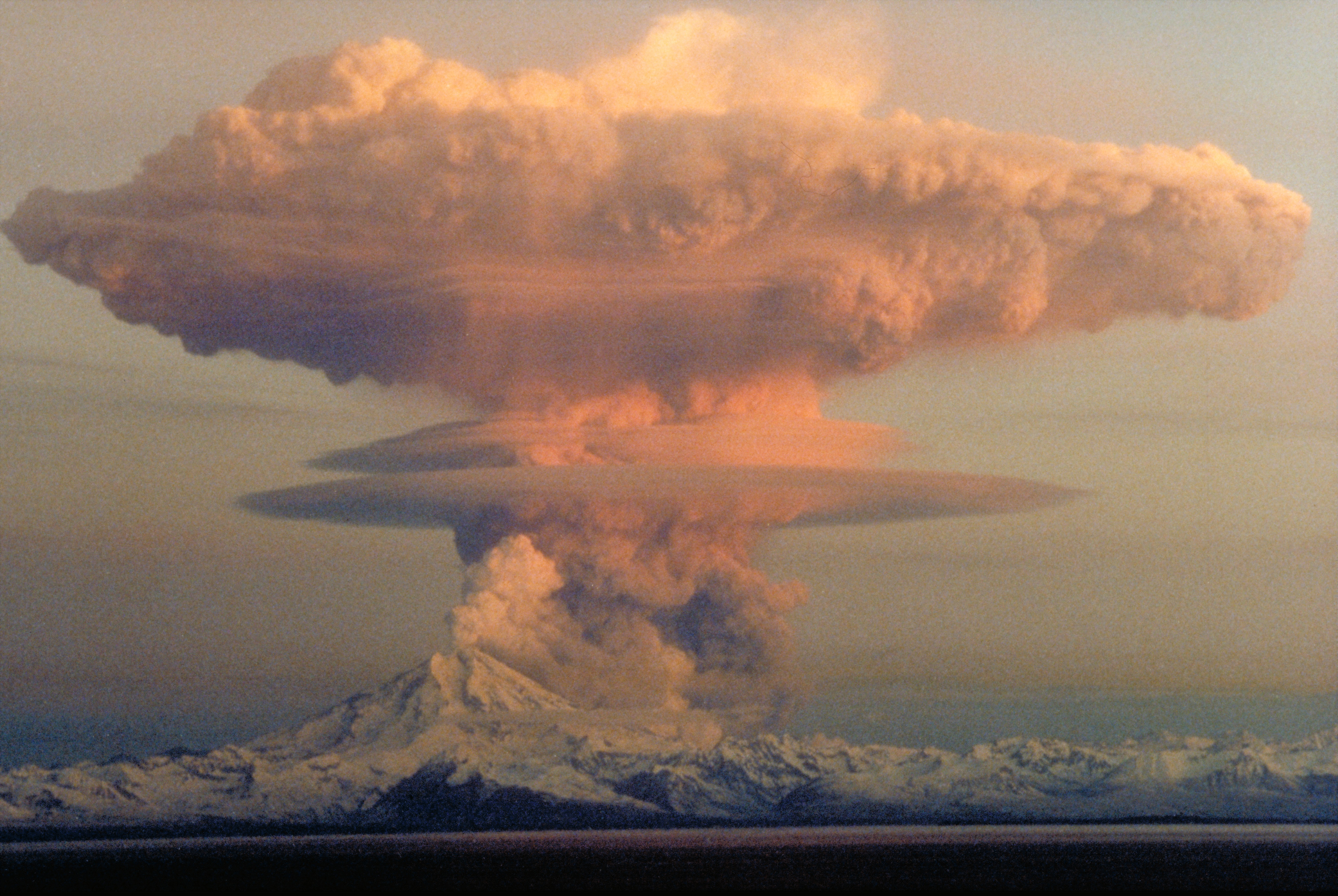
Eruption column rising over Redoubt Volcano, Alaska, on 21 April 1990, which reached a height of about 9 km (5.6 mi)

The column will stop rising once it attains an altitude where it is more dense than the surrounding air. Several factors control the height that an eruption column can reach.

Intrinsic factors include the diameter of the erupting vent, the gas content of the magma, and the velocity at which it is ejected. Extrinsic factors can be important, with winds sometimes limiting the height of the column, and the local thermal temperature gradient also playing a role. The atmospheric temperature in the troposphere normally decreases by about 6-7 K/km, but small changes in this gradient can have a large effect on the final column height. Theoretically, the maximum achievable column height is thought to be about 55 km (34 mi). In practice, column heights ranging from about 2–45 km (1.2–28.0 mi) are seen.

Eruption columns with heights of over 20–40 km (12–25 mi) break through the tropopause and inject particulates into the stratosphere. Ashes and aerosols in the troposphere are quickly removed by precipitation, but material injected into the stratosphere is much more slowly dispersed, in the absence of weather systems. Substantial amounts of stratospheric injection can have global effects: after Mount Pinatubo erupted in 1991, global temperatures dropped by about 0.5 °C (0.90 °F). The largest eruptions are thought to cause temperature drops down to several degrees, and are potentially the cause of some of the known mass extinctions.

Eruption column heights are a useful way of measuring eruption intensity since for a given atmospheric temperature, the column height is proportional to the fourth root of the mass eruption rate. Consequently, given similar conditions, to double the column height requires an eruption ejecting 16 times as much material per second. The column height of eruptions which have not been observed can be estimated by mapping the maximum distance that pyroclasts of different sizes are carried from the vent—the higher the column the further ejected material of a particular mass (and therefore size) can be carried.

The approximate maximum height of an eruption column is given by the equation.

H = k(MΔT)^{1/4}

Where:

k is a constant that depends on various properties, such as atmospheric conditions.
M is the mass eruption rate.
ΔT is the difference in temperature between the erupting magma and the surrounding atmosphere.

== Hazards ==
=== Column collapse ===
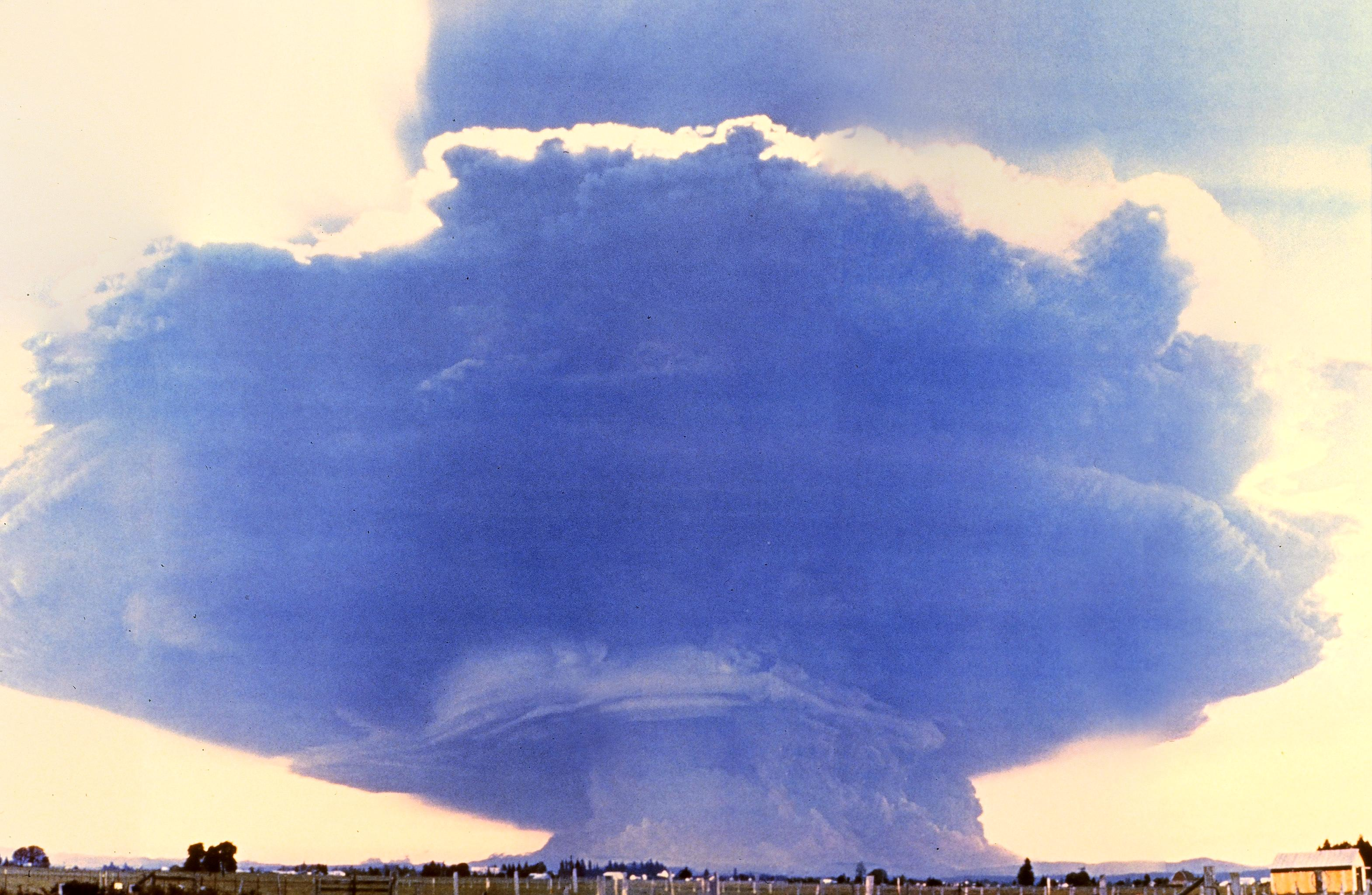
The eruption column produced by the 1980 eruption of Mount St. Helens as seen from the village of Toledo, Washington, which is 56 km (35 mi) away. The cloud was roughly 64 km (40 mi) wide and 24 km; 79,000 ft (15 mi) high.

Eruption columns may become so laden with dense material that they are too heavy to be supported by convection currents. This can suddenly happen if, for example, the rate at which magma is erupted increases to a point where insufficient air is entrained to support it, or if the magma density suddenly increases as denser magma from lower regions in a stratified magma chamber is tapped.

If it does happen, then material reaching the bottom of the convective thrust region can no longer be adequately supported by convection and will fall under gravity, forming a pyroclastic flow or surge which can travel down the slopes of a volcano at speeds of over 100–200 km/h (62–124 mph). Column collapse is one of the most common and dangerous volcanic hazards in column-creating eruptions.

=== Aircraft ===
Several eruptions have seriously endangered aircraft which have encountered or passed by the eruption column. In two separate incidents in 1982, airliners flew into the upper reaches of an eruption column blasted off by Mount Galunggung, and the ash severely damaged both aircraft. Particular hazards were the ingestion of ash stopping the engines, the sandblasting of the cockpit windows rendering them largely opaque and the contamination of fuel through the ingestion of ash through pressurisation ducts. The damage to engines is a particular problem since temperatures inside a gas turbine are sufficiently high that volcanic ash is melted in the combustion chamber, and forms a glass coating on components farther downstream of it, for example on turbine blades.

In the case of British Airways Flight 9, the aircraft lost power on all four engines, and in the other, nineteen days later, three of the four engines failed on a Singapore Airlines 747. In both cases, engines were successfully restarted, but the aircraft were forced to make emergency landings in Jakarta.

Similar damage to aircraft occurred due to an eruption column over Redoubt volcano in Alaska in 1989. Following the eruption of Mount Pinatubo in 1991, aircraft were diverted to avoid the eruption column, but nonetheless, fine ash dispersed over a wide area in Southeast Asia caused damage to 16 aircraft, some as far as 1,000 km (620 mi) from the volcano.

Eruption columns are not usually visible on weather radar and may be obscured by ordinary clouds or night. Because of the risks posed to aviation by eruption columns, there is a network of nine Volcanic Ash Advisory Centers around the world which continuously monitors for eruption columns using data from satellites, ground reports, pilot reports and meteorological models.

== See also ==
- Colloid
- Cryovolcano
- Enceladus – a volcanically active moon of planet Saturn
- Mount Pelée
- Pele (volcano)
- Peléan eruption
- Plinian eruption
