= Hudson Volcano =

Mountain in Chile

- Cerro Hudson
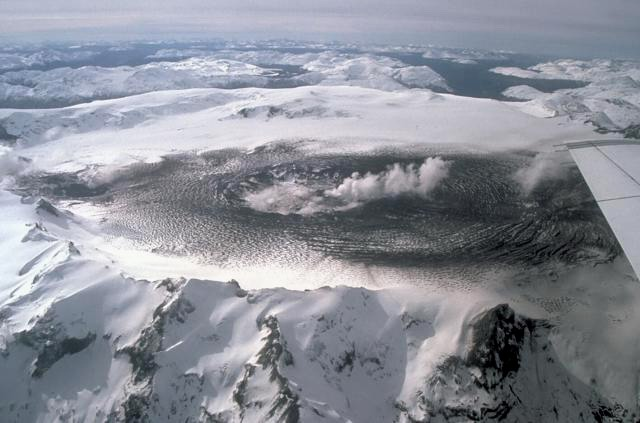
- Aerial photo from 1991

Highest point
- Elevation: 1,905 m (6,250 ft)
- Coordinates: 45.92°S 72.95°W

Naming
- Etymology: Named after Francisco Hudson

Geography
- Location within Chile
- Location: Chile
- Parent range: Andes

Geology
- Mountain type: Caldera
- Volcanic zone: Southern Volcanic Zone
- Last eruption: 2011

Hudson Volcano (Spanish: Volcán Hudson, Cerro Hudson, or Monte Hudson) is the most active volcano in the southern part of the Southern Volcanic Zone of the Andes Mountains in Chile, having erupted most recently in 2011. It was formed by the subduction of the oceanic Nazca Plate under the continental South American Plate. South of Hudson is a smaller volcano, followed by a long gap without active volcanoes, then the Austral Volcanic Zone. Hudson has the form of a 10-kilometre-wide (6-mile) caldera filled with ice; the Huemules Glacier emerges from the northwestern side of the caldera. The volcano has erupted rocks ranging from basalt to rhyolite, but large parts of the caldera are formed by non-volcanic rocks.

The volcano erupted numerous times in the late Pleistocene (Note: The epoch between 2,58 million and 11,700 years ago) and Holocene, (Note: The epoch beginning 11,700 years ago) forming widespread tephra deposits both in the proximity of Hudson and in the wider region. Four large eruptions took place in 17,300–17,440 BP ("H0 eruption"), 7,750 BP ("H1 eruption"), 4,200 BP ("H2 eruption") and in 1991 AD ("H3 eruption"); the second is among the most intense volcanic eruptions in South America during the Holocene. A smaller eruption occurred in 1971. The 7,750 BP and 1991 eruptions had a substantial impact on the human population of Patagonia and (for the 7,750 BP eruption) Tierra del Fuego: The 7,750 BP eruption devastated the local ecosystem and may have caused substantial shifts in human settlement and lifestyle. During the 1991 eruption, volcanic ash covered a large area in Chile and neighbouring Argentina, causing high mortality in farm animals, aggravating an existing economic crisis, and reaching as far as Antarctica.

== Geography and geomorphology ==
Hudson Volcano lies in the Andes of southern Chile, northwest of Lago Buenos Aires. The name "Hudson" refers to Francisco Hudson, a Chilean Navy captain and hydrographer. Another name of the volcano is Cerro de los Ventisqueros. (Note: One source claims that it is technically the correct name of the volcano, giving the name "Hudson" to a different mountain.) Politically, Hudson Volcano is in the Aysen Province of Chile's Aysen Region. Most of the volcano is in the municipality of Aysen; the eastern and southern parts are in the municipalities of Coihaique and Rio Ibáñez, respectively. Owing to its remoteness and the dense vegetation at its foot, the volcano is poorly studied; it was recognized as a volcano only (Note: While it is often stated that the 1971 eruption led to its recognition as a volcano, an unpublished report about the caldera was written in 1970.) in 1970. The closest cities are Puerto Aysen 58 kilometres (36 mi) north-northeast and Coihaique 75 kilometres (47 mi) northeast; the Carretera Austral highway passes 30 kilometres (19 mi) from the volcano. The volcano can be accessed either from the sea along the Huemules River valley or by land via the valley of the Blanco River from Lago Elizalde-Lago Claro. Small populations, mostly farmers, live in the surrounding valleys.

The Andean Volcanic Belt includes four volcanic zones separated by gaps without recent volcanoes. From north to south they are the Northern Volcanic Zone, the Central Volcanic Zone, the Southern Volcanic Zone (SVZ) and the Austral Volcanic Zone (AVZ). Hudson is the second-southernmost volcano of the SVZ, after Rio Murta; erroneously, it is often referred to as the southernmost. Farther south there is the 350-kilometre-long (220 mi) Patagonian Volcanic Gap in the Andean Volcanic Belt, which separates Hudson from the Austral Volcanic Zone and its first volcano, Lautaro. The next volcanoes to the north are Mate Grande 35 kilometres (22 mi) and Macá and Cay 95 kilometres (59 mi) from Hudson, then Mentolat and the Puyuhuapi volcanic field.

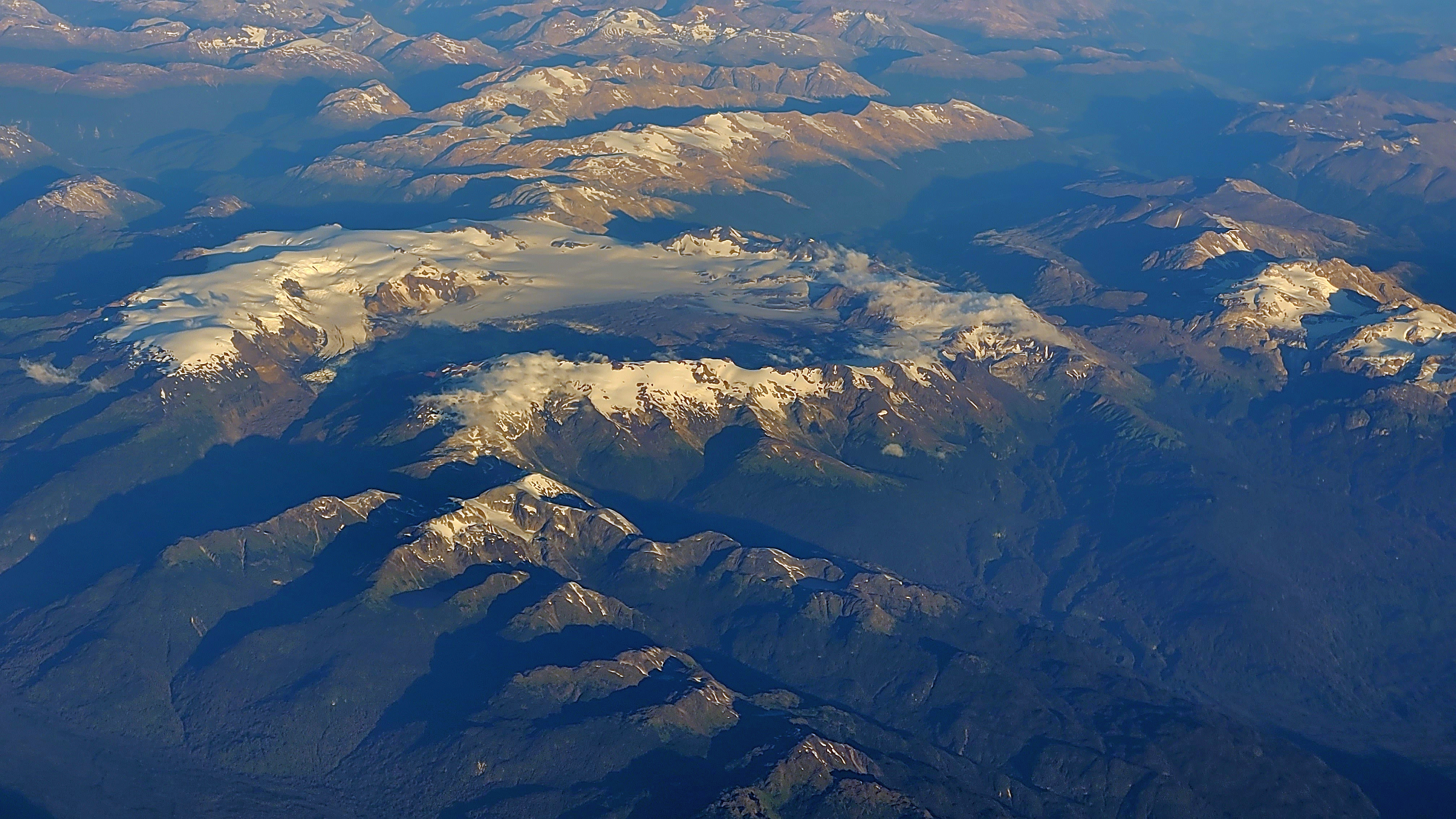
Hudson Caldera from a plane, looking southeast. February 2025

The volcano is a 10-kilometre-wide (6 mi) ice-filled caldera (Note: It appears to consist of two or three nested calderas.) that rises 1,000 to 1,200 metres (3,300 to 3,900 ft) above the surrounding terrain. Only the western and southern margins are well-defined. The highest point reaches 1,905 metres (6,250 ft) elevation. The edifice consists partly of volcanic rocks and partly of uplifted basement, and has an eroded appearance, with steep valleys cutting as much as 1 kilometre (0.6 mi) into the outer reaches of the volcano. The total volume of the volcano is about 147 cubic kilometres (35 cu mi), larger than other SVZ volcanoes, and it covers an area of about 300 square kilometres (120 sq mi). Cinder and spatter cones reach heights of 200 to 300 metres (660 to 980 ft) and are sources of lava flows outside of the caldera, especially in the Sorpresa Sur valley. There are two cones northeast of the caldera and one in the far southwest. The landscape of the Andes around Hudson is formed by numerous mountains (including the Cerros Hudson 12 kilometres (7.5 mi) south of the volcano) with deep, glacially carved valleys. Thick volcanic soils occur in the area.

The caldera is filled with about 2.5 cubic kilometres (0.6 cu mi) of 40-metre-thick (130 ft) ice, forming an ice surface at about 1,505 to 1,520 metres (4,940 to 4,990 ft) elevation. Ice flows out of the northwestern margin of the caldera and forms the Ventisquero de los Huemules Glacier. The Huemules Glacier is the largest glacier of Hudson Volcano, being 11 kilometres (6.8 mi) long, and the headwater of the Huemules River. The glacier is covered by tephra and its surface is at too low an altitude for the tephra to be buried under snow; thus from the air the glacier looks like a lava flow. A small crater lake is at its beginning and occupies a crater of the 1991 eruption. Most of the ice in the caldera was destroyed by the 1971 eruption, but by 1979 it had built up again. During the 1991 eruption, cones surrounded by crevasses and small lakes formed in the ice. The recovery of the ice after the 1991 eruption was slower, and by 2002 Huemules was retreating. During eruptions, pyroclastic material and lava can melt the ice. Other glaciers emanating from the ice cap are the Desplayado, Bayo, Ibáñez, El Frio, Sorpresa Sur and Sorpresa Norte glaciers. They were up to 3 kilometres (1.9 mi) long in 1974 but have retreated since then. Together with the Queulat Ice Cap, the Hudson glaciers make up a large part of the regional glacier inventory, and have left well-preserved moraines. The path of some of the glaciers may be influenced by local tectonic lineaments. Numerous rivers originate on Hudson; clockwise from north to south they include the Rio Desplayado to the north, the Rio Bayo to the east, the Rio Ibáñez, the Rio Sorpresa Sur, Rio Sorpresa Norte all to the southeast, and the Huemules River to the northwest. Numerous hot springs occur in the valleys, and produce creeks whose waters have peculiar smells and tastes. Volcanic activity might be responsible for fluctuations in the discharge of the Huemules River.

== Geology ==
Schematic of a subduction zone

Off the western coast of South America, the Nazca Plate is subducted beneath the South America Plate at a rate—at Hudson's latitude—of about 9 centimetres per year (3.5 in/year). This subduction is responsible for volcanism in the SVZ and the rest of the Andean Volcanic Belt except for the AVZ, where the Antarctic Plate subducts.

West of Hudson and the Taitao Peninsula, the Chile Ridge enters the Peru–Chile Trench, forming the Chile Triple Junction. The subduction of the ridge has produced a slab window in the downgoing slab, causing volcanism to cease in the Miocene (Note: The epoch between 23.03 and 5.333 million years ago) and a gap to open up between the SVZ and the AVZ. The collision began 14 million years ago; since then, the triple junction and the volcanic gap are migrating north. Several fracture zones cut through the downgoing plate, one of which (either the Taitao or the Darwin fracture zone) may project under Hudson. South of the volcano, the Tres Montes Fracture Zone forms the northern boundary of the slab window. The subducted plate is still young and hot. The position of Hudson just east of the triple junction may be responsible for the unusually high activity of the volcano. Older volcanism in the region includes back-arc volcanoes in Patagonia and adakitic rocks in the Taitao Peninsula that were emplaced during the last 4 million years.

Hudson rises from the Patagonian Batholith, a 1,000-kilometre-long (600 mi) formation made up of intrusive rocks (diorite, gabbro, granite, granodiorite and tonalite) that were variously emplaced during the Cretaceous (Note: The epoch between about 145 and 66 million years ago)-Miocene. The crust under the volcano is about 30 kilometres (19 mi) thick. The volcanism in the SVZ is heavily influenced by faults, including the Liquine-Ofqui Fault Zone (LOFZ) which runs parallel to the volcanic belt. In the Hudson area, the LOFZ is formed by two branches connected through perpendicular faults and lies 30 kilometres (19 mi) west of the volcano. The LOFZ moves at a rate of about 1 to 2 centimetres per year (0.4 to 0.8 in/year) in the area. Recently active faults around the volcano can be recognized in the vegetation.

=== Composition and magma plumbing system ===
Hudson has erupted a wide range of volcanic rocks. The cones outside the caldera have produced basaltic andesite and andesite. The Hudson rocks are a potassium-rich calc-alkaline rock suite straddling the alkaline-subalkaline line. Rocks contain only a few phenocrysts, including andesine, apatite, clinopyroxene, ilmenite, oligoclase, olivine, orthopyroxene, plagioclase and titanomagnetite. The composition of Hudson rocks diverges from that of other SVZ volcanoes, with higher concentrations of iron oxide, sodium oxide, titanium oxide and incompatible elements.

The cone lavas include mid-ocean ridge basalt and ocean island basalt components as well as crust- or sediment-derived components, while the caldera magmas formed through fractional crystallization, (Note: Including amphibole) possibly along with the assimilation of crustal material. The three major Holocene eruptions produced uniform magmas with temperatures of 943 to 972 °C (1,729 to 1,782 °F), a few percent water by weight and a trachyandesitic to trachydacitic composition. The H2 eruption led to a change of magma chemistry to more mafic compositions, followed by a reversal during the last 1,000 years.

Magma genesis processes can be complex in slab window areas, as melts derived from the asthenosphere that ascended through the window can take part. Magmas ascending into Hudson halt about 6 to 24 kilometres (4 to 15 mi) underground and undergo a first phase of differentiation. Later the magma ascends into shallower reservoirs and is then stored at a few kilometres depth before the large Holocene eruptions. During historical eruptions, the vents opened up in the southwestern sector of the caldera. Some magmas can bypass the magma chamber and directly ascend to the surface through faults, forming the volcanic cones surrounding Hudson.

== Climate and vegetation ==
The climate at Hudson is oceanic, with mean annual temperatures of 8 to 10 °C (46 to 50 °F). Precipitation at the coast reaches 3,000 millimetres (10 ft) per year, increasing to 10,000 millimetres (30 ft) in the Andes and declining to 800 millimetres (31 in) in the eastern valleys. Precipitation is brought by westerly winds and enhanced on the western slopes of the Andes by orographic precipitation, while the eastern slopes are within the rainshadow. Winds usually blow from the north or northwest and are strong; easterly winds are rare.

The region is covered by temperate rainforests formed by conifers, broadleaf trees and beeches (Nothofagus pumilio). Magellanic moorlands with cushion plants occur in the coastal areas. To the east there is a transition to the Patagonian steppe with grasses, herbs and scrubs. Since the 19th century, the vegetation has been altered by human intervention. South of Hudson is the Northern Patagonian Ice Field. Ice coverage has declined at a rate of 0.5 square kilometres per year (0.19 mi^{2}/a) since 2000.

== Eruption history ==
Hudson has been active for more than one million years. The northeastern sector of the volcano is older than the southeastern, which has yielded ages of 120,000–100,000 years, but the incomplete stratigraphy of the edifice, which is largely covered with ice, precludes establishing a proper history of its growth. There are few tephras from the Pleistocene–Holocene transition time close to the volcano, but several have been found in marine cores west of Hudson.

During the Last Glacial Maximum, Hudson was at the centre of a large ice sheet that covered the entire region with ice more than 1 kilometre (0.62 mi) thick. Tephra from its eruptions fell on the ice and was carried away by glaciers, ending up in their moraines. The deglaciation that began 17,900 years ago may have enhanced volcanic activity; the largest eruptions of Hudson, Llaima and Villarrica took place at that time. The melting of the ice would have depressurized the buried magma systems, thus enhancing volcanic activity immediately after deglaciation. After deglaciation was complete, the volumes of the intense Hudson eruptions decreased. On the other hand, glaciation has removed most of the volcanic record of Patagonia pre-dating 14,500 years ago.

=== Holocene ===
Numerous explosive eruptions took place during the Holocene, including three intense eruptions among the largest of Holocene South America. There is a regularity, with intense explosive eruptions occurring about every 3,870 years, but their volumes have decreased over time and erupted rocks have become less mafic. Smaller Plinian eruptions occur about every 500 to 1000 years. Having erupted 55 times during the past 22,000 years, Hudson Volcano is the most active volcano in Patagonia and of the southernmost SVZ, (Note: Formerly it was thought that it had been largely inactive during the past 10,000 years.) producing more than 45 cubic kilometres (11 cu mi) of tephra after the ice ages.

The Hudson caldera probably formed during the Holocene and grew incrementally. Pre-caldera outcrops are rare and consist of breccias formed by hyaloclastite, lahars (Note: A lahar is a volcanic mudflow.), mafic lavas and pyroclastic rocks; they occur mostly on the northeastern and southern sides of the caldera. Outside of the caldera, especially to the south, are widespread pyroclastic fall deposits formed by banded pumice. Lahar deposits contain blocks of lava embedded within a fine-grained substrate. An ignimbrite probably associated with the formation of the caldera occurs all around Hudson. A Holocene lava flow extends along the Huemules valley and is 1 to 5 metres (3 to 16 ft) thick. The flow may be either 1,000 or 13,000 (Note: By argon-argon dating) years old; it was possibly the product of multiple eruptions. The volcanic cones outside of the caldera are weathered and covered by vegetation; they are of Holocene age. Other geologic processes such as glacial erosion have modified the appearance of the Hudson volcano.

Pyroclastic fall and tephra deposits from Hudson and other volcanoes have been identified in marine cores in the Pacific Ocean, sediments in lakes and peat bogs, in soils, and potentially in Antarctic ice cores. Such tephra layers can be used to compare the timing of events across wide regions. Tephra particles from Hudson have varying shapes and colours, but similar compositions. The closest tephra record to Hudson is the Laguna Miranda record 50 kilometres (30 mi) away, which shows on average one tephra layer every 225 years although it only records eruptions that distributed ash in the direction of the lake. Several Hudson tephra layers from Juncal Alto 92 kilometres (57 mi) have been named T1 through T9, and another set from lakes in the Chonos Archipelago and Taitao Peninsula is named HW1 through HW7.

Selected tephra layers from Hudson
Date BP, (Note: Conversion of CE to BP by adding 1950, and from AD by subtracting the AD from 1950) sources unless given otherwise, margins of error omitted	Taitao marine core tephra	Chonos Archipelago lacustrine tephra	Juncal Alto tephra layers	Notes
19,860	TL12			
19,660	TL11			
19,600	TL10			
19,450	TL9			
18,900	TL8			
18,750	TL7			
17,350	TL6			
16,100/14,560/14,533	TL5	HW1		Estimated volume of 0.05 cubic kilometres (0.012 cu mi)
14,110/13,890/13,798	TL4	HW2		Estimated volume of 0.05 cubic kilometres (0.012 cu mi)
12,000/11,060/11,428	TL3	HW3		Estimated volume of 0.05 cubic kilometres (0.012 cu mi)
10,750	TL2			Tentatively assigned to Hudson
6,910/7,765			T1	Estimated volume of 1 cubic kilometre (0.24 cu mi)
6,700/7,540		HW4	T2	H1 eruption
5,840/7,221			T3	Estimated volume of 0.1 cubic kilometres (0.024 cu mi)
4,200/4,717			T4	Estimated volume of 1 cubic kilometre (0.24 cu mi)
3,840		HW5	T5	H2 eruption
2,740/2,558/2,470		HW6		Also found southeast of the volcano and possibly East Antarctica. Its estimated volume is 0.05 cubic kilometres (0.012 cu mi) but it was probably not intense.
2,070/2,054			T6	Estimated volume of 0.5 cubic kilometres (0.12 cu mi). Also found in the Talos Dome, Antarctica
1,920/1,560	TL1	HW7		Estimated volume of 0.05 cubic kilometres (0.012 cu mi). The attribution of a tephra layer in the Talos Dome of Antarctica is questionable.
1,090/1,072			T7	Estimated volume of 0.1 cubic kilometres (0.024 cu mi)
210/252			T8	Estimated volume of 0.1 cubic kilometres (0.024 cu mi)
−21 (1971 AD)			T9	

An uncertain eruption may have occurred in 8,010 BC. The 1,000 years ago date of the Huemules lava flow may correlate it to a mafic eruption 1,000 years ago, which also deposited tephra east and northeast from the volcano. Tephra layers from 1035 AD and 9,216 BC in the Siple Dome of Antarctica have been attributed to Hudson, but for the older eruption there is no evidence in South America of an appropriately sized event. The Las Guanacas cave 100 kilometres (62 mi) southeast of Hudson preserves ash from Hudson more than 10,000 years old. On the Taitao Peninsula, tephra layers have been attributed to two eruptions in 11,910 and 9,960 years before present. These are isolated occurrences, indicating that they are not the products of very intense eruptions that would be expected to leave widespread deposits. Westward spread of Hudson tephras was more common in the earliest Holocene, when the westerlies of the Southern Hemisphere were located north of Hudson.

== Significant eruptions and recent activity ==
=== H0 eruption: 17,300–17,440 BP ===
The H0 eruption took place between 17,440–17,300 BP during late glacial times. It is the largest known eruption of Hudson, yielding more than 20 cubic kilometres (4.8 cu mi) (Note: Which may be an overestimate.) of tephra, and may have initiated the growth of the caldera. The eruption occurred during deglaciation and was probably caused by the unloading of the magmatic system, when the overlying ice melted. The eruption occurred in several stages that yielded distinct rock compositions, and like the 1991 AD eruption it included two distinct chemistries. Basalt and trachyandesite were the dominant components.

The tephra was emplaced northeastward. Its thickness exceeded 50 centimetres (20 in) up to present-day Coihaique and the border with Argentina. Tephra from the H0 eruption has been found in Lago Churasco, Lago Élida, Lago Mellizas, Lago Quijada, Lago Toro, Lago Shaman and Lago Unco northeast of Hudson. After the eruption had ended, winds redeposited the tephras over distances of 400 kilometres (250 mi).

=== H1 eruption: 7,750 BP ===
The largest Holocene eruption of Hudson – and the largest in the southern Andes – took place in 7,750 (Note: Older date estimates are 8260 or 6700 BP.) BP, and is known as the H1 eruption. It produced about 18 cubic kilometres (4.3 cu mi) of trachydacitic or trachyandesitic rocks, thus reaching a volcanic explosivity index of 6. A mass wasting deposit in the Aysen Fjord and the ignimbrite surrounding Hudson probably came from this eruption. The tephra deposits have three layers; an intermediary aggregate lapilli formed through phreatomagmatic activity from a tall eruption column, and two overlying and underlying layers of pumiceous lapilli. Water, presumably from glaciers and permafrost on the volcano, drove the phreatomagmatic activity. Water interaction was more intense during H1 than during the H2 and H3 eruptions, which may imply that the caldera collapse occurred during this eruption, causing effective magma-ice interaction.

Ash from the H1 eruption fell south-southeast from the volcano, extending over all of southern Patagonia and part of Magallanes. It has been recovered from wind-transported sediments, lakes like Lago Cardiel and Laguna Potrok Aike, peat bogs including at Puerto del Hambre and Punta Arenas, and archaeological sites. More distant sites include Isla de los Estados and Siple Dome in West Antarctica. The Patagonian-Tierra del Fuego Tephra II originated in this eruption. The wide dispersal of the ash was either due to the eruption column exceeding 55 kilometres (34 mi) height or to strong winds. Similar to the 1991 eruption, the H1 eruption would have buried food and water resources and caused various health ailments. This would have caused a collapse of the terrestrial ecosystems in Patagonia, possibly causing a lasting shift of guanaco populations.

Changes in human populations at Cueva de las Manos and the extinction of human mitochondrial DNA lineages have been attributed to H1, and some sites may have been abandoned completely. Around the Beagle Channel, people may have changed their settlement patterns due to the eruption and sea level rise. More controversially, the eruption may have caused a cessation of the southern Patagonian obsidian trade, and a shift towards the use of coastal resources by people in Patagonia.

==== Impact on Tierra del Fuego ====
The green-brown tephra deposits in Tierra del Fuego were produced by this eruption. On Tierra del Fuego, the H1 tephra covers an area exceeding 40,000 square kilometres (15,000 sq mi). Thicknesses reach 4 to 20 centimetres (2 to 8 in), thicker than deposits closer to the volcano.

The H1 eruption had a severe impact on the environment of Tierra del Fuego, with the vegetation being buried by ash fall. The impact on human populations in Tierra del Fuego would have been severe, possibly causing the total extinction of hunter-gatherers on Tierra del Fuego or even of all human life on the island. Vertebrates were decimated and large mammals wiped out. After the eruption, activities at the Túnel 1 archaeological site changed from a terrestrial lifestyle to one that relied on coastal food sources which were less vulnerable to volcanic impacts. A hypothesis claim that the island may have been resettled over a millennium later by people arriving using bark canoes. These immigrants would then have reintroduced mammals such as guanacos on the island.

=== H2 eruption: 4,200 BP ===
The H2 eruption occurred about 4,200 years (Note: Older estimates of its age are 3600 or 3920 BP.) ago. Pumices form three or four distinct layers, which consist mostly of trachydacite and/or trachyrhyolite. The eruption had a volume either similar to or smaller than that of the H1 eruption, but larger than the H3, reaching a volcanic explosivity index of six. It or neoglacial climate change may have caused changes in the vegetation close to the volcano.

Ash layers have been found at various sites close to the volcano, with cryptotephra reaching the Falklands. The occurrence at Lago Quijada is the reference section for the H2 eruption. Unlike the H1 and H3 eruptions, the H2 ash was dispersed mainly to the east and at larger distances to the southeast, forming a wider deposit. It has been identified in archaeological sites such as Los Toldos, Cerro Tres Tetas and La María; evidence at Los Toldos and other sites indicates that humans left the area after the H2 eruption and migrated along the Andes.

=== H3 eruption: 1991 AD ===
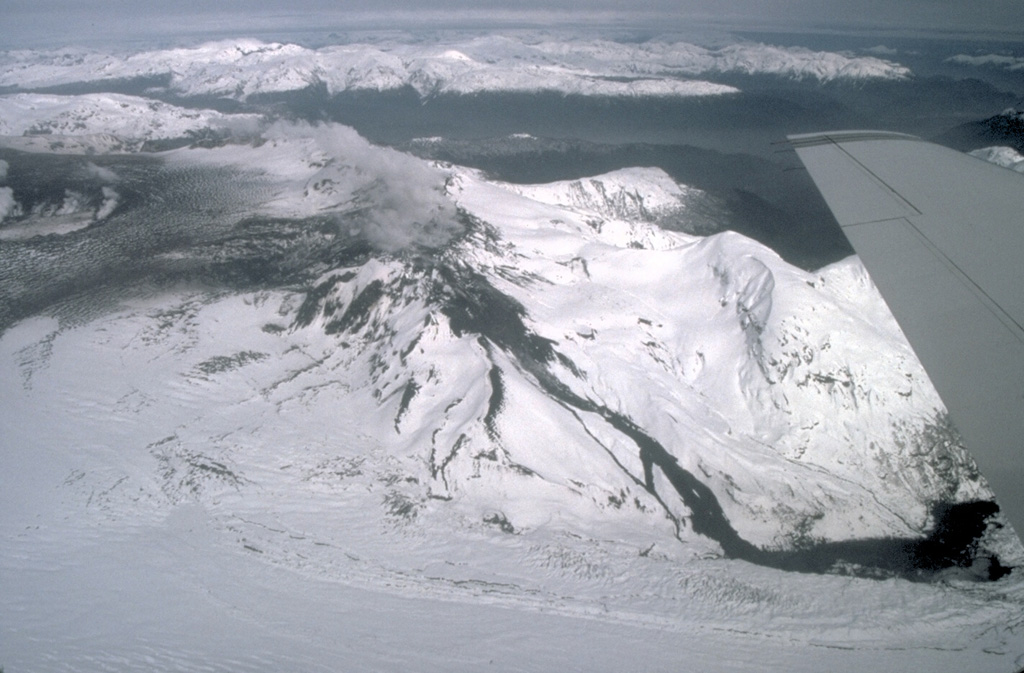
Cerro Hudson after the 1991 eruption

The 1991 Plinian eruption is known as the H3 eruption. After a few hours of seismic activity, a phreatomagmatic eruption commenced on August 8 at 18:20 in the northwestern sector of the caldera. The phreatomagmatic phase formed a 4-kilometre-long (2.5 mi) fissure and a 400-metre-wide (1,300 ft) crater. On August 12, a Plinian eruption formed an 800-metre-wide (2,600 ft) crater in the southwestern sector. The eruption continued for the following three days. Seismic and fumarolic activity continued for the next months, and small eruptions may have occurred in October.

The initial phreatomagmatic eruption was basaltic. The chemistry of the erupted rocks changed during the course of the eruption from trachyandesite to trachydacite, perhaps due to fractional crystallization of phenocrysts or amphibole and magma mixing. Initially, basaltic magma rose in the edifice and entered a trachyandesitic reservoir at 2 to 3 kilometres (1.2 to 1.9 mi) depth, until the stresses opened up another pathway along local-scale fractures. This formed the northwestern vent and associated lava flows. Later, the roof of the reservoir failed, allowing the trachyandesitic magma to ascend to the surface and form the southwestern vent. The eruption may have been triggered by tectonic stress changes caused by the 1960 Valdivia earthquake.

The eruption is the second-largest historic volcanic eruption in Chile, only behind the 1932 Quizapu eruption. With a volcanic explosivity index of 5, it is one of the largest volcanic eruptions of the 20th century. It formed a 12-kilometre-high (7.5 mi) eruption column and pyroclastic flows within the caldera. A 4-kilometre-long (2.5 mi) lava flow was emplaced on the caldera ice and flowed down the Huemules River. Part of the ice cap melted. A lahar with a volume of about 0.04 to 0.045 cubic kilometres (0.0096 to 0.0108 cu mi) ran for 40 kilometres (25 mi) down the Huemules River to the Pacific Ocean. Ash deposited by the volcano was eroded by rivers and redeposited in their deltas, enlarging them. Wind-driven erosion of the ash in the semiarid region produced continued ash fall, which was sometimes mistaken for renewed activity, and 1.5-metre-thick (4.9 ft) wind-blown dust accumulations formed in some areas. This eruption was observed by Chilean volcanologists, who tracked the course of events and its products.

More than 4 cubic kilometres (1 cu mi) of tephra fell along two axes: A narrow northern one and a much wider and longer east-southeast trending axis from the volcano in southern Patagonia and the South Atlantic Ocean. The northern ash was produced by the phreatomagmatic phase and the southeastern one by the Plinian phase. Ash fell over an area of about 150,000 square kilometres (58,000 sq mi) in Chile and Argentina, reaching as far as the Falkland Islands and South Georgia. The ash fall buried vegetation and roads, caused house roofs to collapse and contaminated water supplies. Animals saw their pastures buried and food contaminated by ash, their wools weighed down, and people reported problems with breathing and eyesight owing to the irritating ash. Ailments (Note: Not fluorosis, as is commonly reported.) caused by the ash and preceding harsh winter killed about half of all grazing animals in the directly affected areas such as Argentina's Santa Cruz Province, where damage exceeded 10,000,000 dollars. Along with other climatic and economic crises, the Hudson eruption led to a severe depopulation in the region and an economic crisis in the Chilean territory around Hudson, which had to be alleviated through state aid.

==== Intercontinental spread of ash ====
Winds transported the plume towards Antarctica and in the westerlies surrounding the polar vortex, circling the continent in a month and reaching Chile again after a week. Ash from the eruption was found in snow at the South Pole, arriving there in December, in ice cores of East Antarctica, and in various sites of the northern Antarctic Peninsula, where it arrived in August. Aircraft noted the ash cloud as far as Melbourne in Australia. Particles from Hudson have been found in ice at Mount Everest, Himalaya.

The 1991 eruption of Hudson took place in the same year as the 1991 eruption of Mount Pinatubo. The Pinatubo aerosols had already spread worldwide when Hudson erupted and had a much larger mass than the Hudson aerosols, meaning that the Pinatubo eruption had a much stronger effect on the atmosphere than the Hudson one. Unlike the Pinatubo eruption, Hudson mostly produced volcanic ash which fell out more quickly. However, the Hudson cloud led to substantial ozone loss over Antarctica and had comparable effects (Note: Some weather anomalies in the northern hemisphere might be linked to Hudson too.) in the southern hemisphere to the Pinatubo eruption.

=== Other historical activity ===
There are reports of historical eruptions in the late 19th century, but only an 1891 eruption can be attributed to Hudson. There are single reports of eruptions in 1930 and 1965. A crater in the centre-western sector of the caldera may have been active around 1973. A lahar in that year killed a number of animals and two shepherds; it may either be non-volcanic or due to a subglacial eruption. Other lahars may have occurred in 1972 and 1979.

On the morning of 12 August 1971, tremors heralded the onset of a new eruption. It lasted for three days and reached a volcanic explosivity index of 3 to 4, smaller than the 1991 eruption. An eruption column rose 5 to 12 kilometres (3 to 7 mi) above the volcano and deposited tephra to the east into the South Atlantic Ocean. Ashfall buried pastures and left deposits in lakes of the Chonos Archipelago. A lahar descended the Huemules River, killing at least five people and damaging houses and farms. The lahar dragged blocks of ice along, swept the valley clear of trees and produced a pumice raft in the sea off the mouth of the Huemules River. No pyroclastic flows formed during this eruption, while subglacial lava flows may or may not have formed.

During the 1990s, episodes of volcanic gas release killed animals in the Huemules valley. They do not appear to be linked to (visible) volcanic activity.

The last eruption was in October 2011, and was preceded by increasing hydrothermal and seismic activity, the latter lasting for a few days. The eruption began on October 26 and ended on November 1. Three vents formed in the southern sector of the caldera. Ash columns rose to almost 1 kilometre (0.6 mi) altitude. Lahars ran along several valleys surrounding the volcano, probably caused by ice interacting with the hydrothermal system of the volcano. Chilean authorities evacuated about 140 people from the region due to the threat from ash fall and lahars.

Between 1991 and 2008, uplift took place at the volcano. Initially at a pace of 5 centimetres per year (2 in/year), after 2004 it decreased to a rate of 2 centimetres per year (0.8 in/year). The uplift was probably caused by the entry of new magma in Hudson's plumbing system. Presently, shallow seismicity takes place under Hudson and south of it, between 0 to 10 kilometres (0 to 6 mi) underground, and is probably related to volcanic activity.

== Hazards ==
The 1991 eruption has drawn attention to hazards stemming from Hudson and other Patagonian volcanoes. About 84,000 people live within 50 kilometres (31 mi) of Hudson. Despite the low population density in the regions of Argentina downwind of Hudson, ash fall could cause serious impacts on farming and animal husbandry.

Most eruptions led to tephra fallout around the volcano, with more intense eruptions producing pyroclastic flows outside of the caldera. Mudflows caused by melting of ice or erosion of tephra and pyroclastic deposits have occurred in the Huemules and Ibáñez valleys.

After the 1991 eruption of Hudson, the Argentine SEGEMAR initiated a monitoring programme for Argentine volcanoes. The Chilean SERNAGEOMIN published a volcano hazard map in 2014, which shows areas threatened by lahars, lava flows, pyroclastic fall, pyroclastic flows, tephra fallout and volcanic bombs. According to the map, the highest hazards exist in the Huemules and Sorpresas valleys, in the caldera and its immediate surroundings. Other high-risk areas are the northern, southwestern and southeastern slopes of the volcano. Medium hazards occur in the rest of the valleys around Hudson Volcano, with low hazard areas in the more distant valleys east of the volcano. As of 2023, the municipal planning of the municipalities on the Chilean side close to the volcano largely ignores volcanic hazards.

== Bibliography ==
- Bitschene, Peter René (1995). La erupcion del volcan Hudson (Andes Patagonicos) en agosto 1991. Universidad Nacional de la Patagonia San Juan Bosco. OCLC 883455940.
