= Quitralco Fjord =

Fjord in Aysén Region, Chile

Coordinates: 45°43′27.39″S 73°25′21.81″W

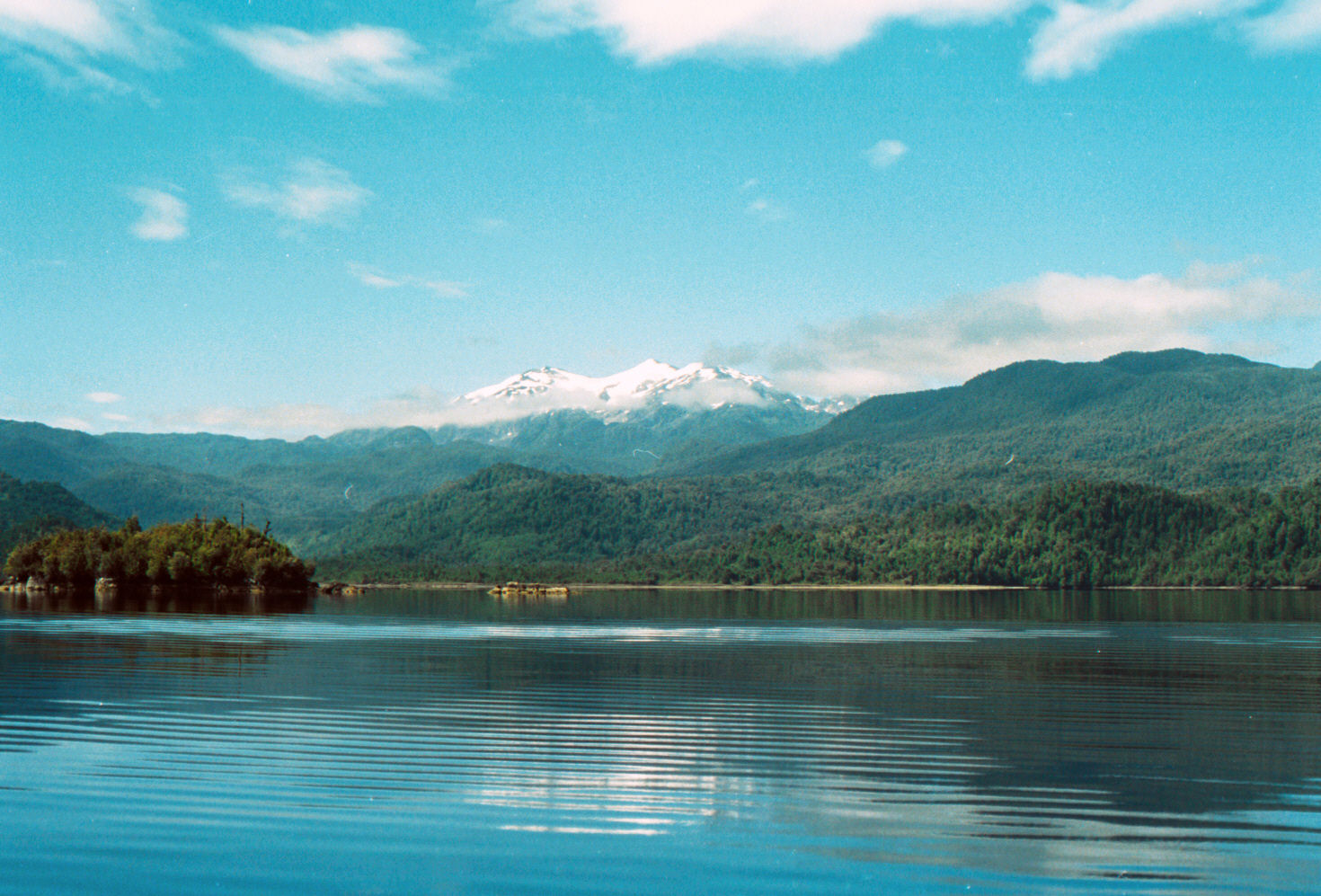
View of Quitralco Fjord from the Quitralco hotsprings.

Quitralco Fjord (Spanish: Estero Quitralco or Fiordo Quitralco) is a fjord in Aysén Region, Chile. The fjord from Moraleda Channel in the southwest to the Liquiñe-Ofqui Fault in the northwest. Indeed, at the head of the fjord there is an underwater fault scarp of Liquiñe-Ofqui Fault. Mate Grande Volcano lies a few kilometers to the northeast of the fjord's head and Mount Hudson Volcano is visible from the fjord. There are hot springs along the fjord. Most of the near-shore vegetation is made op of ferns and bushes. Trees that grow around the fjord include Nothofagus dombeyi (coigüe) and Drimys winteri (canelo).
