= Volcanic ash =

Natural material created during volcanic eruptions

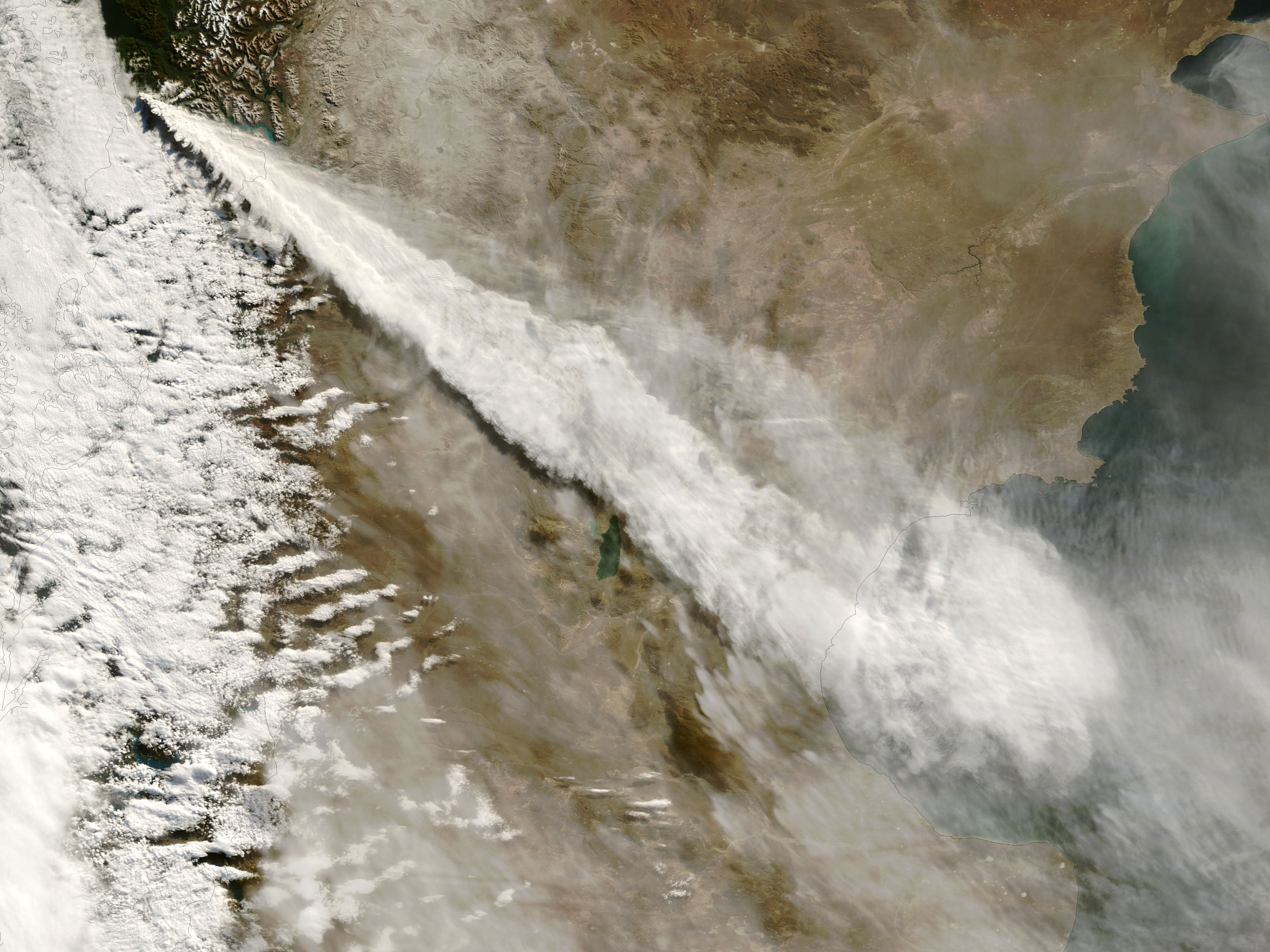
Ash cloud from the 2008 eruption of Chaitén volcano, Chile, stretching across Patagonia from the Pacific to the Atlantic Ocean

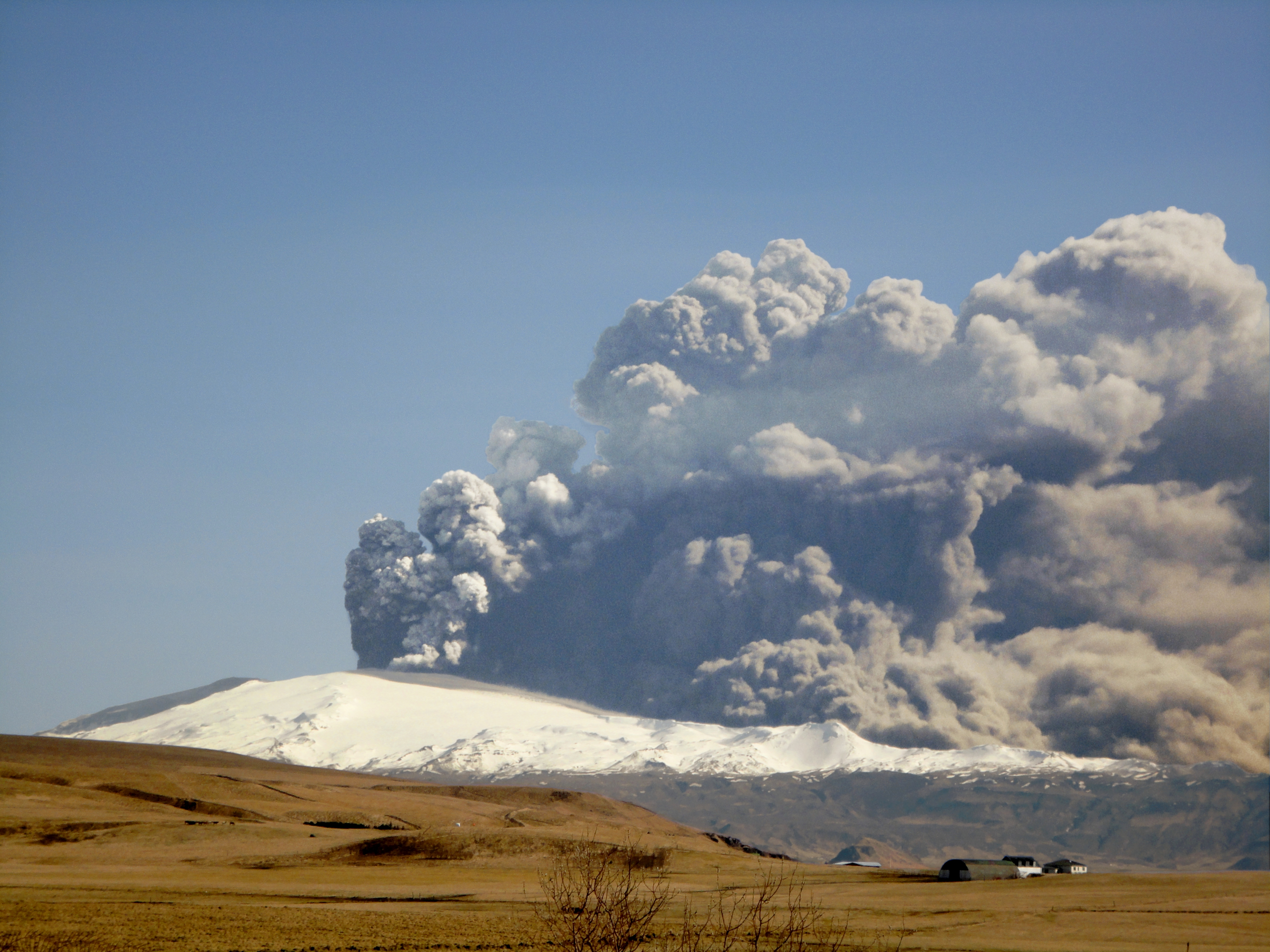
Ash plume rising from Eyjafjallajökull on April 17, 2010

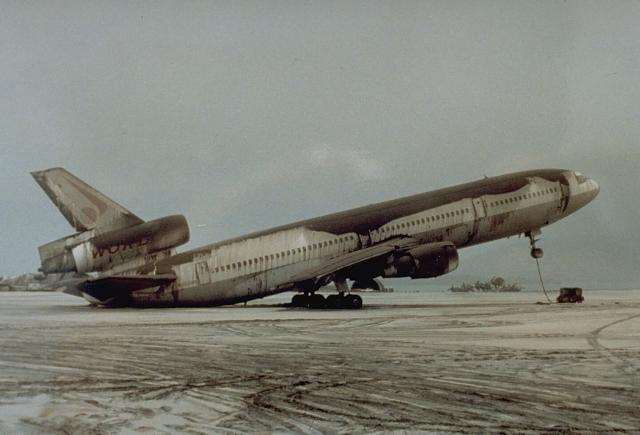
Volcanic ash deposits on a parked McDonnell Douglas DC-10-30 during the 1991 eruption of Mount Pinatubo. While falling ash behaves in a similar manner to snow, the sheer weight of deposits can cause serious damage to buildings and vehicles. In this case, volcanic ash deposits shifted the airliner's center of gravity, leading to it resting on its tail.

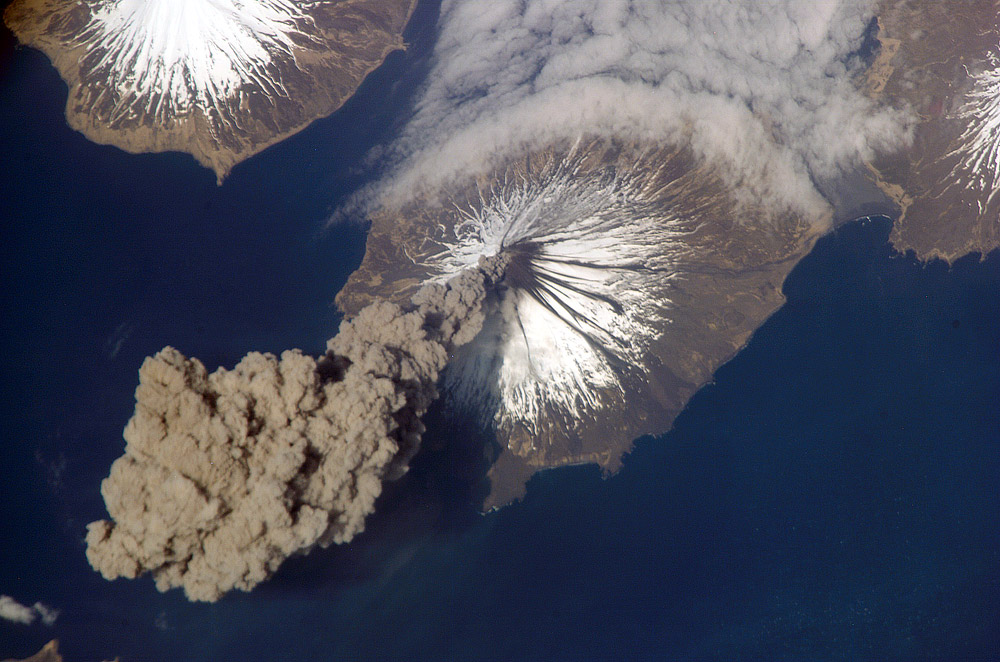
Ash plume from Mt Cleveland, a stratovolcano in the Aleutian Islands

Volcanic ash consists of fragments of rock, mineral crystals, and volcanic glass, produced during volcanic eruptions and measuring less than 2 mm (0.079 in) in diameter. The term volcanic ash is also often loosely used to refer to all explosive eruption products (correctly referred to as tephra), including particles larger than 2 mm. Volcanic ash is formed during explosive volcanic eruptions when dissolved gases in magma expand and escape violently into the atmosphere. The force of the gases shatters the magma and propels it into the atmosphere where it solidifies into fragments of volcanic rock and glass. Ash is also produced when magma comes into contact with water during phreatomagmatic eruptions, causing the water to explosively flash to steam leading to shattering of magma. Once in the air, ash is transported by wind up to thousands of kilometres away.

Due to its wide dispersal, ash can have a number of impacts on society including: animal and human health problems, disruption to aviation, disruption to critical infrastructure (e.g., electric power supply systems, telecommunications, water and waste-water networks, transportation), primary industries (e.g., agriculture), and damage to buildings and other structures.

== Formation ==
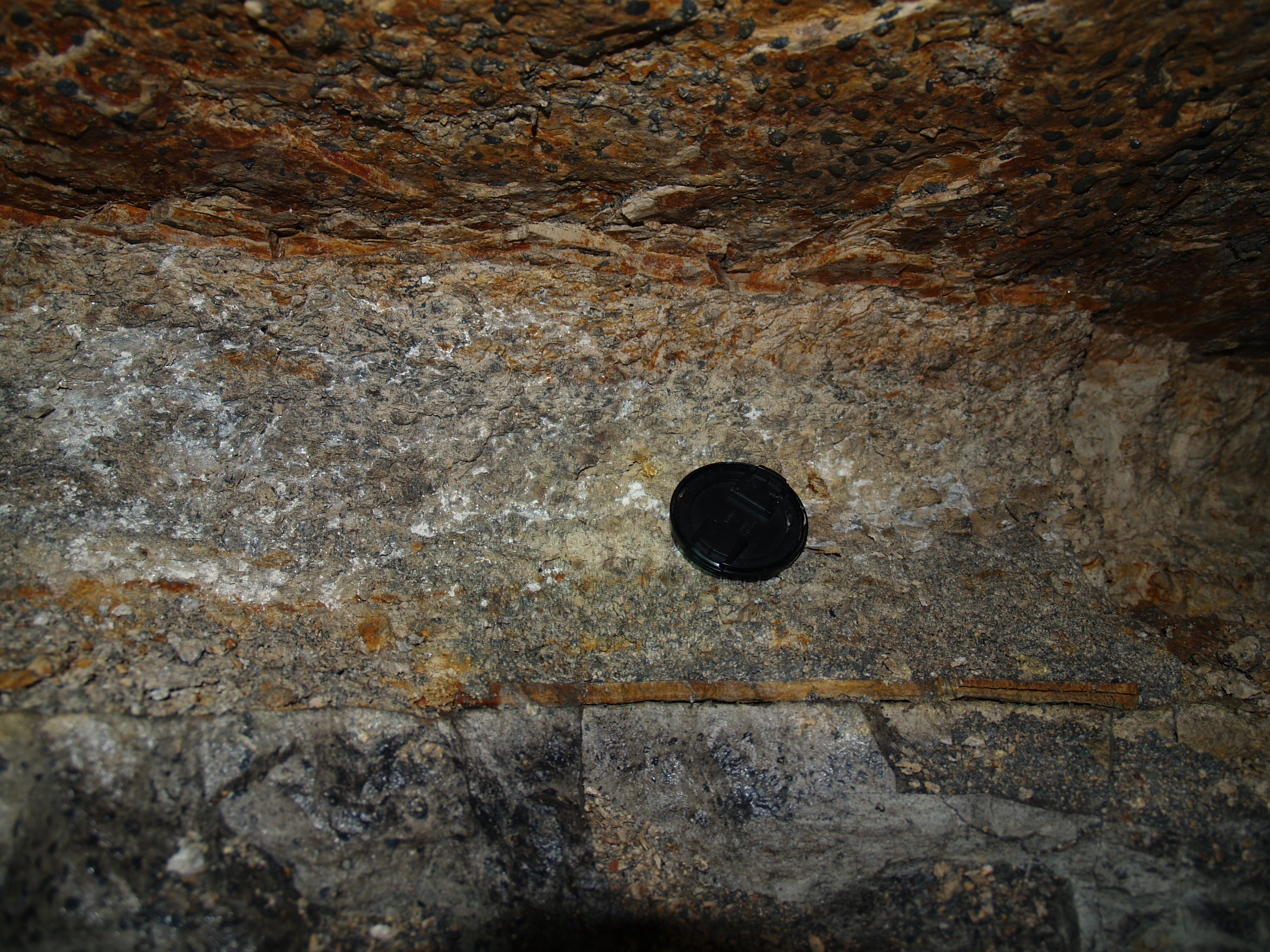
454 million-year-old volcanic ash between layers of limestone in the catacombs of Peter the Great's Naval Fortress in Estonia near Laagri. This is a remnant of one of the oldest large eruptions preserved. The diameter of the black camera lens cover is 58 mm (2.3 in).

Volcanic ash is formed during explosive volcanic eruptions and phreatomagmatic eruptions, and may also be formed during transport in pyroclastic density currents.

Explosive eruptions occur when magma decompresses as it rises, allowing dissolved volatiles (mainly water and carbon dioxide) to exsolve into gas bubbles. As more bubbles nucleate a foam is produced, which decreases the density of the magma, accelerating it up the conduit. Fragmentation occurs when bubbles occupy ~70–80 vol% of the erupting mixture. When fragmentation occurs, violently expanding bubbles tear the magma apart into fragments which are ejected into the atmosphere where they solidify into ash particles. Fragmentation is a very efficient process of ash formation and is capable of generating very fine ash even without the addition of water.

Volcanic ash is also produced during phreatomagmatic eruptions. During these eruptions fragmentation occurs when magma comes into contact with bodies of water (such as the sea, lakes and marshes) groundwater, snow or ice. As the magma, which is significantly hotter than the boiling point of water, comes into contact with water an insulating vapour film forms (Leidenfrost effect). Eventually this vapour film will collapse leading to direct coupling of the cold water and hot magma. This increases the heat transfer which leads to the rapid expansion of water and fragmentation of the magma into small particles which are subsequently ejected from the volcanic vent. Fragmentation causes an increase in contact area between magma and water creating a feedback mechanism, leading to further fragmentation and production of fine ash particles.

Pyroclastic density currents can also produce ash particles. These are typically produced by lava dome collapse or collapse of the eruption column. Within pyroclastic density currents particle abrasion occurs as particles violently collide, resulting in a reduction in grain size and production of fine grained ash particles. In addition, ash can be produced during secondary fragmentation of pumice fragments, due to the conservation of heat within the flow. These processes produce large quantities of very fine grained ash which is removed from pyroclastic density currents in co-ignimbrite ash plumes.

Physical and chemical characteristics of volcanic ash are primarily controlled by the style of volcanic eruption. Volcanoes display a range of eruption styles which are controlled by magma chemistry, crystal content, temperature and dissolved gases of the erupting magma and can be classified using the volcanic explosivity index (VEI). Effusive eruptions (VEI 1) of basaltic composition produce <10^{5} m^{3} of ejecta, whereas extremely explosive eruptions (VEI 5+) of rhyolitic and dacitic composition can inject large quantities (>10^{9} m^{3}) of ejecta into the atmosphere.

== Properties ==
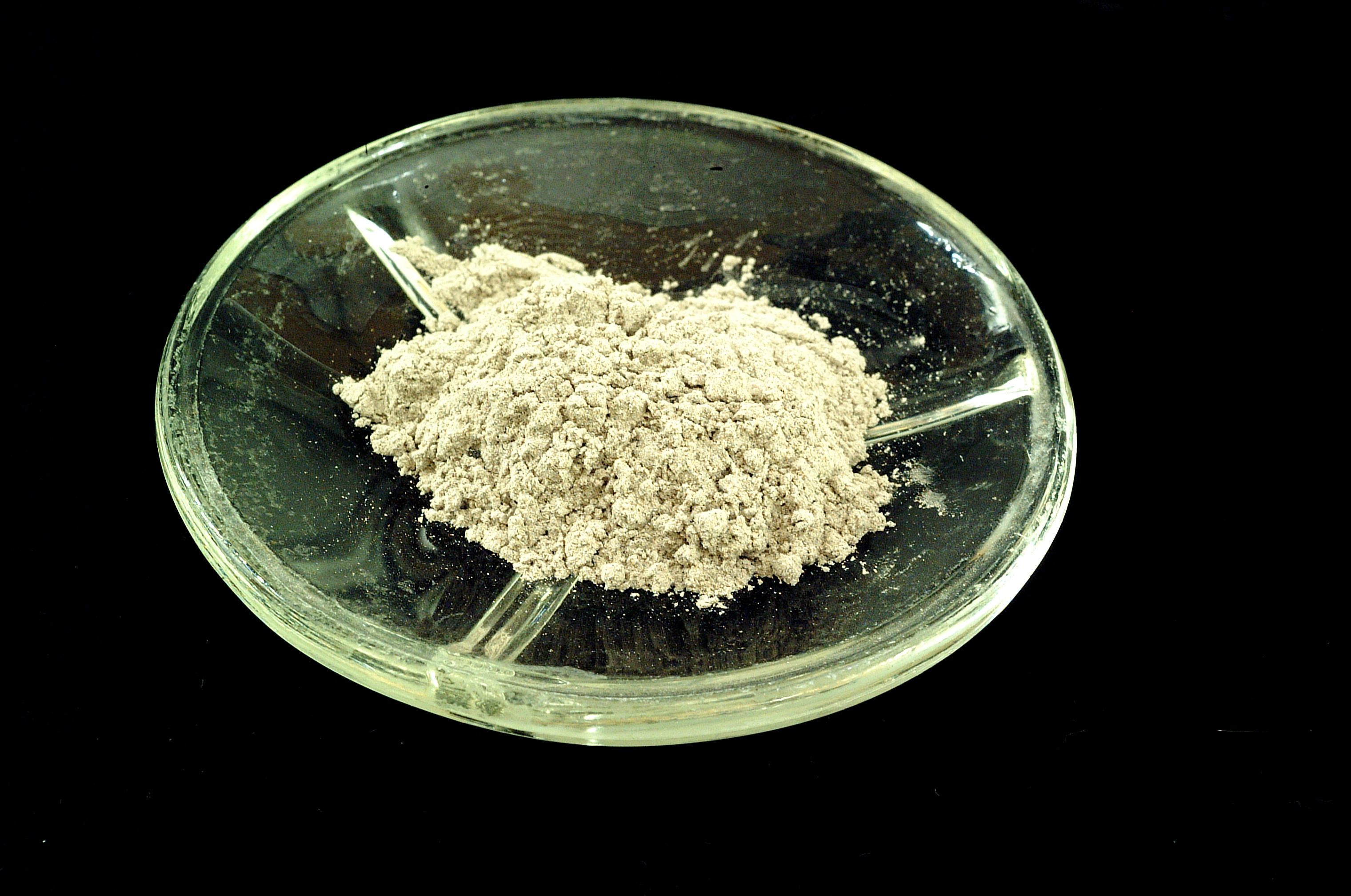
Volcanic ash from the 1980 eruption of Mount St. Helens

=== Chemical ===
The types of minerals present in volcanic ash are dependent on the chemistry of the magma from which it erupted. Considering that the most abundant elements found in silicate magma are silicon and oxygen, the various types of magma (and therefore ash) produced during volcanic eruptions are most commonly explained in terms of their silica content. Low energy eruptions of basalt produce a characteristically dark coloured ash containing ~45–55% silica that is generally rich in iron (Fe) and magnesium (Mg). The most explosive rhyolite eruptions produce a felsic ash that is high in silica (>69%) while other types of ash with an intermediate composition (e.g., andesite or dacite) have a silica content between 55 and 69%.

The principal gases released during volcanic activity are water, carbon dioxide, hydrogen, sulfur dioxide, hydrogen sulfide, carbon monoxide and hydrogen chloride. The sulfur and halogen gases and metals are removed from the atmosphere by processes of chemical reaction, dry and wet deposition, and by adsorption onto the surface of volcanic ash.

It has long been recognised that a range of sulfate and halide (primarily chloride and fluoride) compounds are readily mobilised from fresh volcanic ash. It is considered most likely that these salts are formed as a consequence of rapid acid dissolution of ash particles within eruption plumes, which is thought to supply the cations involved in the deposition of sulfate and halide salts.

While some 55 ionic species have been reported in fresh ash leachates, the most abundant species usually found are the cations Na^{+}, K^{+}, Ca^{2+} and Mg^{2+} and the anions Cl^{−}, F^{−} and SO_{4}^{2−}. Molar ratios between ions present in leachates suggest that in many cases these elements are present as simple salts such as NaCl and CaSO_{4}. In a sequential leaching experiment on ash from the 1980 eruption of Mount St. Helens, chloride salts were found to be the most readily soluble, followed by sulfate salts Fluoride compounds are in general only sparingly soluble (e.g., CaF_{2}, MgF_{2}), with the exception of fluoride salts of alkali metals and compounds such as calcium hexafluorosilicate (CaSiF_{6}). The pH of fresh ash leachates is highly variable, depending on the presence of an acidic gas condensate (primarily as a consequence of the gases SO_{2}, HCl and HF in the eruption plume) on the ash surface.

The crystalline-solid structure of the salts act more as an insulator than a conductor. However, once the salts are dissolved into a solution by a source of moisture (e.g., fog, mist, light rain, etc.), the ash may become corrosive and electrically conductive. A recent study has shown that the electrical conductivity of volcanic ash increases with (1) increasing moisture content, (2) increasing soluble salt content, and (3) increasing compaction (bulk density). The ability of volcanic ash to conduct electric current has significant implications for electric power supply systems.

=== Physical ===
==== Components ====
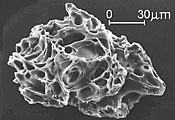
A scanning electron micrograph image of a particle of volcanic ash from Mount St. Helens

Volcanic ash particles erupted during magmatic eruptions are made up of various fractions of vitric (glassy, non-crystalline), crystalline or lithic (non-magmatic) particles. Ash produced during low viscosity magmatic eruptions (e.g., Hawaiian and Strombolian basaltic eruptions) produce a range of different pyroclasts dependent on the eruptive process. For example, ash collected from Hawaiian lava fountains consists of sideromelane (light brown basaltic glass) pyroclasts which contain microlites (small quench crystals, not to be confused with the rare mineral microlite) and phenocrysts. Slightly more viscous eruptions of basalt (e.g., Strombolian) form a variety of pyroclasts from irregular sideromelane droplets to blocky tachylite (black to dark brown microcrystalline pyroclasts). In contrast, most high-silica ash (e.g. rhyolite) consists of pulverised products of pumice (vitric shards), individual phenocrysts (crystal fraction) and some lithic fragments (xenoliths).

Ash generated during phreatic eruptions primarily consists of hydrothermally altered lithic and mineral fragments, commonly in a clay matrix. Particle surfaces are often coated with aggregates of zeolite crystals or clay and only relict textures remain to identify pyroclast types.

==== Morphology ====
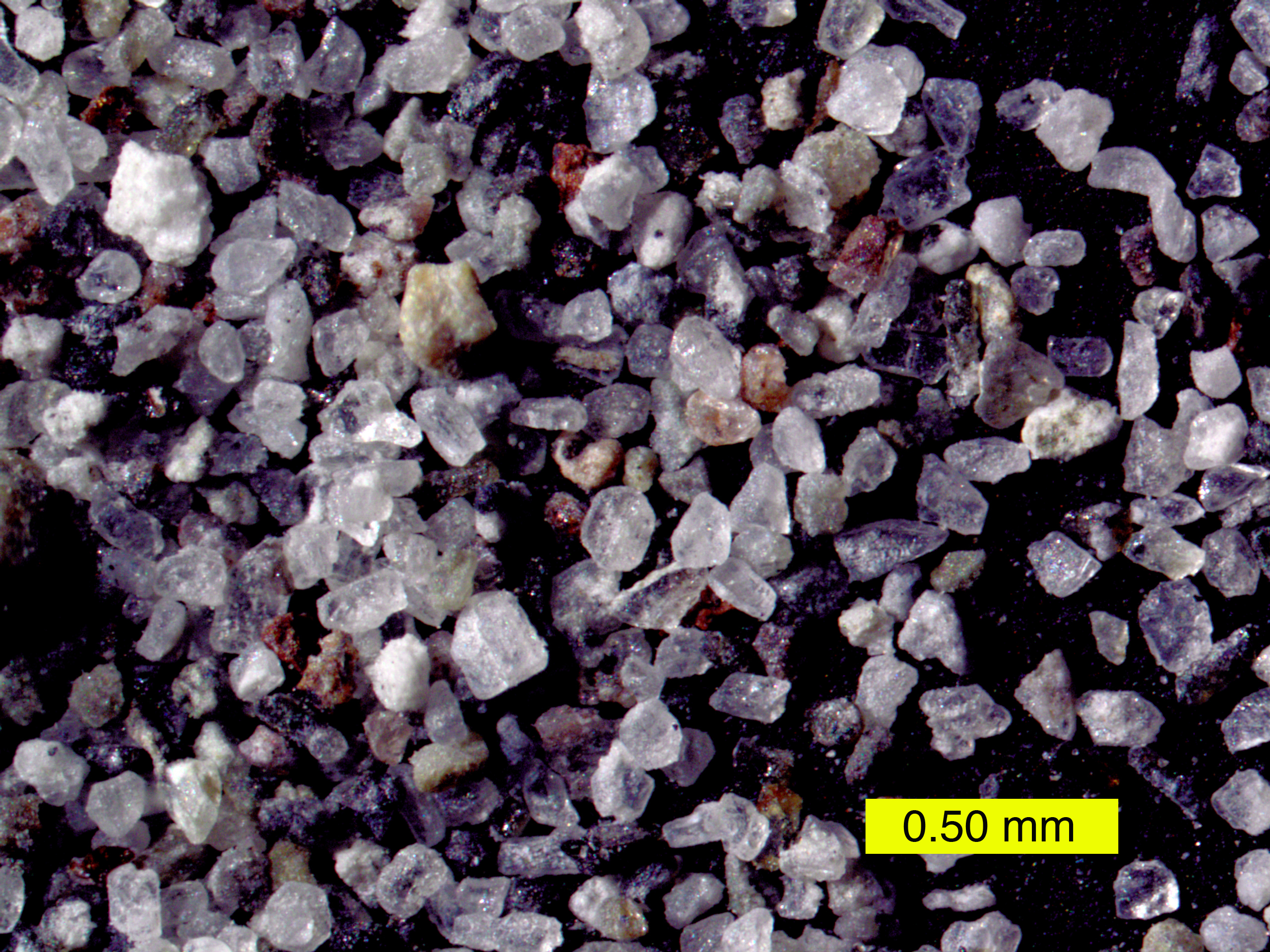
Light microscope image of ash from the 1980 eruption of Mount St. Helens, Washington

The morphology (shape) of volcanic ash is controlled by a plethora of different eruption and kinematic processes. Eruptions of low-viscosity magmas (e.g., basalt) typically form droplet shaped particles. This droplet shape is, in part, controlled by surface tension, acceleration of the droplets after they leave the vent, and air friction. Shapes range from perfect spheres to a variety of twisted, elongate droplets with smooth, fluidal surfaces.

The morphology of ash from eruptions of high-viscosity magmas (e.g., rhyolite, dacite, and some andesites) is mostly dependent on the shape of vesicles in the rising magma before disintegration. Vesicles are formed by the expansion of magmatic gas before the magma has solidified. Ash particles can have varying degrees of vesicularity and vesicular particles can have extremely high surface area to volume ratios. Concavities, troughs, and tubes observed on grain surfaces are the result of broken vesicle walls. Vitric ash particles from high-viscosity magma eruptions are typically angular, vesicular pumiceous fragments or thin vesicle-wall fragments while lithic fragments in volcanic ash are typically equant, or angular to subrounded. Lithic morphology in ash is generally controlled by the mechanical properties of the wall rock broken up by spalling or explosive expansion of gases in the magma as it reaches the surface.

The morphology of ash particles from phreatomagmatic eruptions is controlled by stresses within the chilled magma which result in fragmentation of the glass to form small blocky or pyramidal glass ash particles. Vesicle shape and density play only a minor role in the determination of grain shape in phreatomagmatic eruptions. In this sort of eruption, the rising magma is quickly cooled on contact with ground or surface water. Stresses within the "quenched" magma cause fragmentation into five dominant pyroclast shape-types: (1) blocky and equant; (2) vesicular and irregular with smooth surfaces; (3) moss-like and convoluted; (4) spherical or drop-like; and (5) plate-like.

==== Density ====
The density of individual particles varies with different eruptions. The density of volcanic ash varies between 700 and 1200 kg/m^{3} for pumice, 2350–2450 kg/m^{3} for glass shards, 2700–3300 kg/m^{3} for crystals, and 2600–3200 kg/m^{3} for lithic particles. Since coarser and denser particles are deposited close to source, fine glass and pumice shards are relatively enriched in ash fall deposits at distal locations. The high density and hardness (~5 on the Mohs Hardness Scale) together with a high degree of angularity, make some types of volcanic ash (particularly those with a high silica content) very abrasive.

==== Grain size ====
Volcanic ash grain size distributions from four volcanic eruptions

Volcanic ash consists of particles (pyroclasts) with diameters less than 2 mm (particles larger than 2 mm are classified as lapilli), and can be as fine as 1 μm. The overall grain size distribution of ash can vary greatly with different magma compositions. Few attempts have been made to correlate the grain size characteristics of a deposit with those of the event which produced it, though some predictions can be made. Rhyolitic magmas generally produce finer grained material compared to basaltic magmas, due to the higher viscosity and therefore explosivity. The proportions of fine ash are higher for silicic explosive eruptions, probably because vesicle size in the pre-eruptive magma is smaller than those in mafic magmas. There is good evidence that pyroclastic flows produce high proportions of fine ash by communition and it is likely that this process also occurs inside volcanic conduits and would be most efficient when the magma fragmentation surface is well below the summit crater.

== Dispersal ==
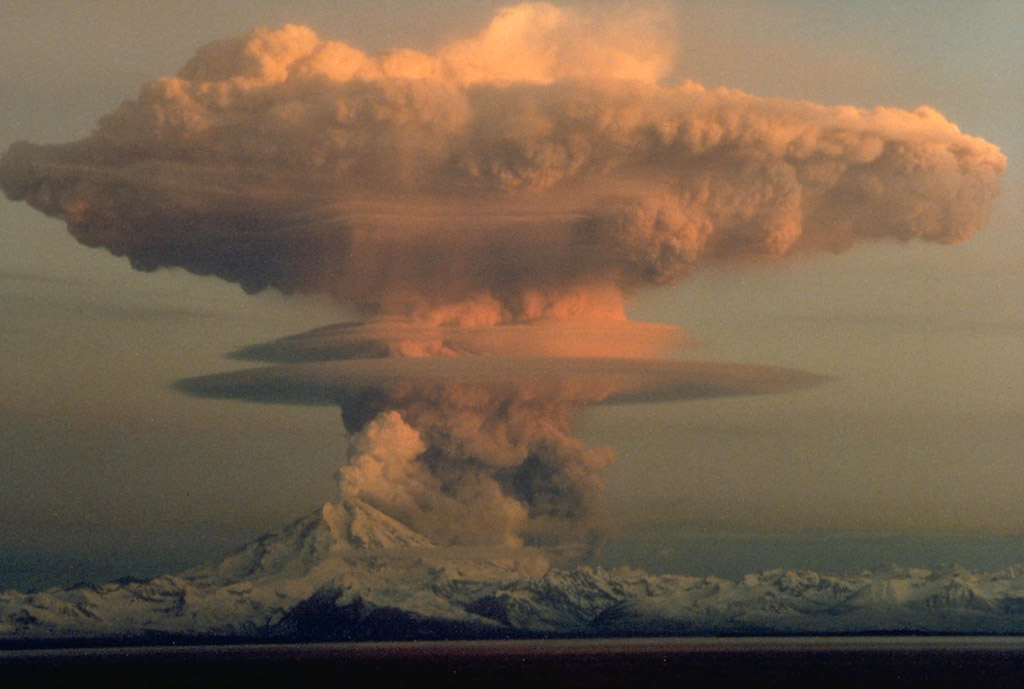
Ash plume rising from Mount Redoubt after an eruption on April 21, 1990

Ash particles are incorporated into eruption columns as they are ejected from the vent at high velocity. The initial momentum from the eruption propels the column upwards. As air is drawn into the column, the bulk density decreases and it starts to rise buoyantly into the atmosphere. At a point where the bulk density of the column is the same as the surrounding atmosphere, the column will cease rising and start moving laterally. Lateral dispersion is controlled by prevailing winds and the ash may be deposited hundreds to thousands of kilometres from the volcano, depending on eruption column height, particle size of the ash and climatic conditions (especially wind direction and strength and humidity).

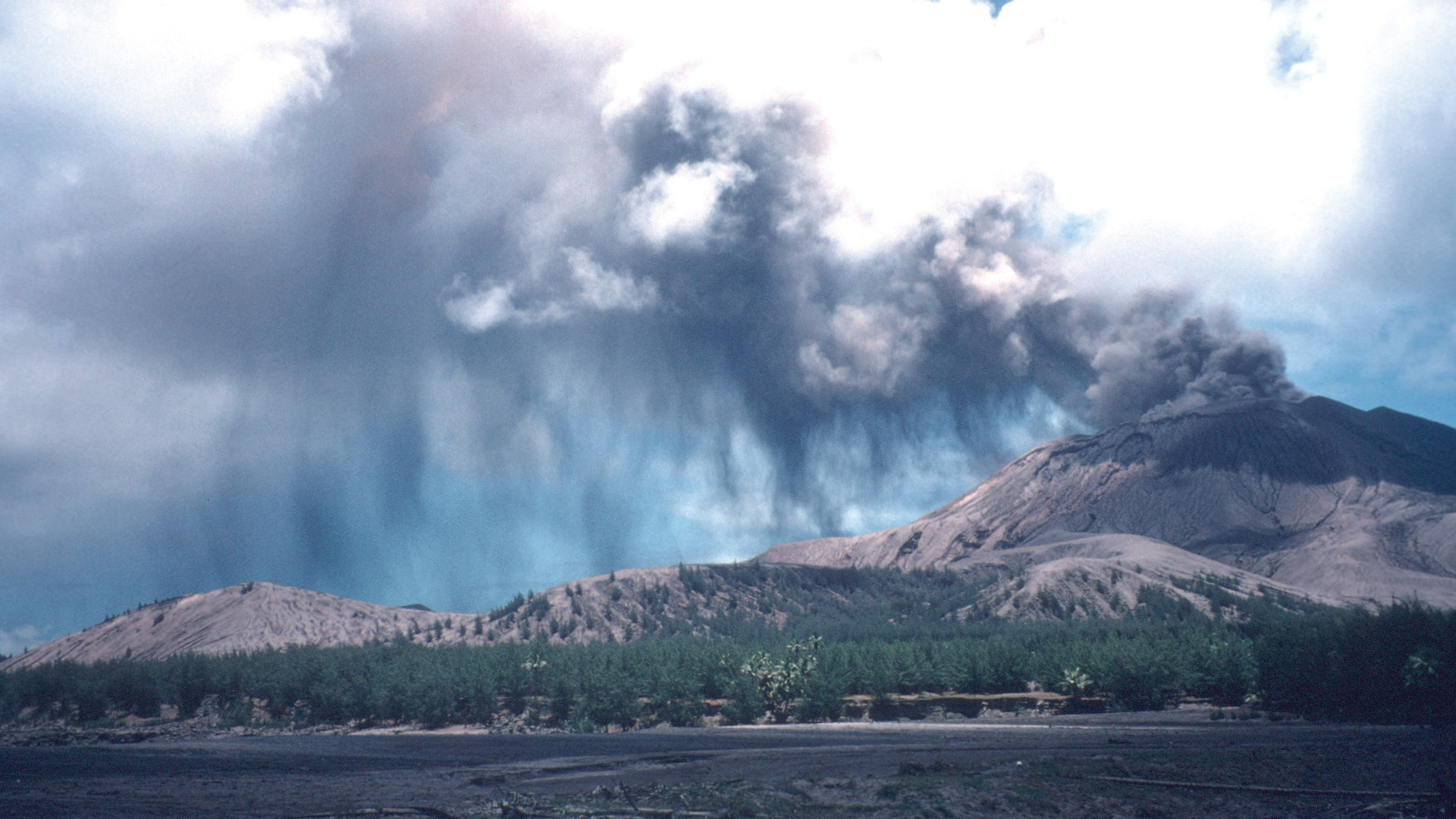
Ash plume and ash fallout at Mount Pagan, May 1994

Ash fallout occurs immediately after the eruption and is controlled by particle density. Initially, coarse particles fall out close to source. This is followed by fallout of accretionary lapilli, which is the result of particle agglomeration within the column. Ash fallout is less concentrated during the final stages as the column moves downwind. This results in an ash fall deposit which generally decreases in thickness and grain size exponentially with increasing distance from the volcano. Fine ash particles may remain in the atmosphere for days to weeks and be dispersed by high-altitude winds. These particles can impact the aviation industry (refer to impacts section) and, combined with gas particles, can affect global climate.

Volcanic ash plumes can form above pyroclastic density currents. These are called co-ignimbrite plumes. As pyroclastic density currents travel away from the volcano, smaller particles are removed from the flow by elutriation and form a less dense zone overlying the main flow. This zone then entrains the surrounding air and a buoyant co-ignimbrite plume is formed. These plumes tend to have higher concentrations of fine ash particles compared to magmatic eruption plumes due to the abrasion within the pyroclastic density current.

== Impacts ==
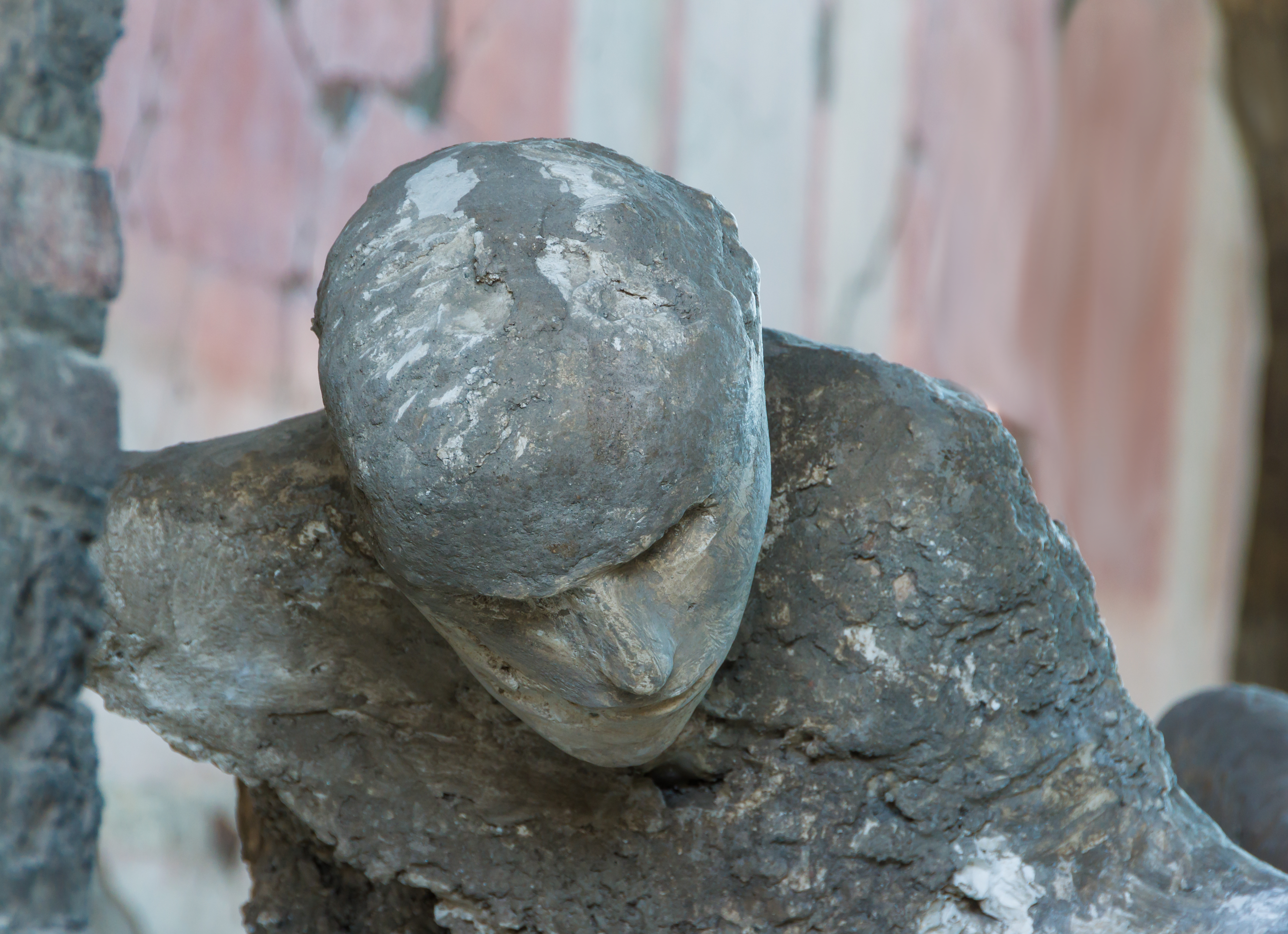
Cast of a victim of the 79 AD Mount Vesuvius eruptions, Pompeii, Italy

Population growth has caused the progressive encroachment of urban development into higher risk areas, closer to volcanic centres, increasing the human exposure to volcanic ash fall events.

Direct health effects of volcanic ash on humans are usually short-term and mild for persons in normal health, though prolonged exposure potentially poses some risk of silicosis in unprotected workers. Of greater concern is the impact of volcanic ash on the infrastructure critical to supporting modern societies, particularly in urban areas, where high population densities create high demand for services. Several recent eruptions have illustrated the vulnerability of urban areas that received only a few millimetres or centimetres of volcanic ash. This has been sufficient to cause disruption of transportation, electricity, water, sewage and storm water systems. Costs have been incurred from business disruption, replacement of damaged parts and insured losses. Ash fall impacts on critical infrastructure can also cause multiple knock-on effects, which may disrupt many different sectors and services.

Volcanic ash fall is physically, socially, and economically disruptive. Volcanic ash can affect both proximal areas and areas many hundreds of kilometres from the source, and causes disruptions and losses in a wide variety of different infrastructure sectors. Impacts are dependent on: ash fall thickness; the grain size and chemistry of the ash; whether the ash is wet or dry; the duration of the ash fall; and any preparedness, management and prevention (mitigation) measures employed to reduce effects from the ash fall. Different sectors of infrastructure and society are affected in different ways and are vulnerable to a range of impacts or consequences. These are discussed in the following sections.

=== Human and animal health ===
Ash particles of less than 10 μm diameter suspended in the air are known to be inhalable, and people exposed to ash falls have experienced respiratory discomfort, breathing difficulty, eye and skin irritation, and nose and throat symptoms. Most of these effects are short-term and are not considered to pose a significant health risk to those without pre-existing respiratory conditions. The health effects of volcanic ash depend on the grain size, mineralogical composition and chemical coatings on the surface of the ash particles. Additional factors related to potential respiratory symptoms are the frequency and duration of exposure, the concentration of ash in the air and the respirable ash fraction; the proportion of ash with less than 10 μm diameter, known as PM_{10}. The social context may also be important.

Chronic health effects from volcanic ash fall are possible, as exposure to free crystalline silica is known to cause silicosis. Minerals associated with this include quartz, cristobalite and tridymite, which may all be present in volcanic ash. These minerals are described as ‘free’ silica as the SiO_{2} is not attached to another element to create a new mineral. However, magmas containing less than 58% SiO_{2} are thought to be unlikely to contain crystalline silica.

The exposure levels to free crystalline silica in the ash are commonly used to characterise the risk of silicosis in occupational studies (for people who work in mining, construction and other industries,) because it is classified as a human carcinogen by the International Agency for Research on Cancer. Guideline values have been created for exposure, but with unclear rationale; UK guidelines for particulates in air (PM10) are 50 μg/m^{3} and USA guidelines for exposure to crystalline silica are 50 μg/m^{3}. It is thought that the guidelines on exposure levels could be exceeded for short periods of time without significant health effects on the general population.

There have been no documented cases of silicosis developed from exposure to volcanic ash. However, long-term studies necessary to evaluate these effects are lacking.

==== Ingesting ash ====
For surface water sources such as lakes and reservoirs, the volume available for dilution of ionic species leached from ash is generally large. The most abundant components of ash leachates (Ca, Na, Mg, K, Cl, F and SO_{4}) occur naturally at significant concentrations in most surface waters and therefore are not affected greatly by inputs from volcanic ashfall, and are also of low concern in drinking water, with the exception of fluorine. The elements iron, manganese and aluminium are commonly enriched over background levels by volcanic ashfall. These elements may impart a metallic taste to water, and may produce red, brown or black staining of whiteware, but are not considered a health risk. Volcanic ashfalls are not known to have caused problems in water supplies for toxic trace elements such as mercury (Hg) and lead (Pb) which occur at very low levels in ash leachates.

Ingesting ash may be harmful to livestock, causing abrasion of the teeth, and in cases of high fluorine content, fluorine poisoning (toxic at levels of >100 μg/g) for grazing animals. It is known from the 1783 eruption of Laki in Iceland that fluorine poisoning occurred in humans and livestock as a result of the chemistry of the ash and gas, which contained high levels of hydrogen fluoride. Following the 1995/96 Mount Ruapehu eruptions in New Zealand, two thousand ewes and lambs died after being affected by fluorosis while grazing on land with only 1–3 mm of ash fall. Symptoms of fluorosis among cattle exposed to ash include brown-yellow to green-black mottles in the teeth, and hypersensibility to pressure in the legs and back. Ash ingestion may also cause gastrointestinal blockages. Sheep that ingested ash from the 1991 Mount Hudson volcanic eruption in Chile, suffered from diarrhoea and weakness.

==== Other effects on livestock ====
Ash accumulating in the back wool of sheep may add significant weight, leading to fatigue and sheep that can not stand up. Rainfall may result in a significant burden as it adds weight to ash. Pieces of wool may fall away and any remaining wool on sheep may be worthless as poor nutrition associated with volcanic eruptions impacts the quality of the fibre. As the usual pastures and plants become covered in volcanic ash during eruption some livestock may resort to eat whatever is available including toxic plants. There are reports of goats and sheep in Chile and Argentina having natural abortions in connection to volcanic eruptions.

=== Infrastructure ===
==== Electricity ====
Electrical insulator flashover caused by volcanic ash contamination

Volcanic ash can disrupt electric power supply systems at all levels of power generation, transformation, transmission, and distribution. There are four main impacts arising from ash-contamination of apparatus used in the power delivery process:

- Wet deposits of ash on high voltage insulators can initiate a leakage current (small amount of current flow across the insulator surface) which, if sufficient current is achieved, can cause ‘flashover’ (the unintended electrical discharge around or over the surface of an insulating material).

If the resulting short-circuit current is high enough to trip the circuit breaker then disruption of service will occur. Ash-induced flashover across transformer insulation (bushings) can burn, etch or crack the insulation irreparably and can result in the disruption of the power supply.

- Volcanic ash can erode, pit, and scour metallic apparatus, particularly moving parts such as water and wind turbines and cooling fans on transformers or thermal power plants.
- The high bulk density of some ash deposits can cause line breakage and damage to steel towers and wooden poles due to ash loading. This is most hazardous when the ash and/or the lines and structures are wet (e.g., by rainfall) and there has been ≥10 mm of ashfall. Fine-grained ash (e.g., <0.5 mm diameter) adheres to lines and structures most readily. Volcanic ash may also load overhanging vegetation, causing it to fall onto lines. Snow and ice accumulation on lines and overhanging vegetation further increases the risk of breakage and or collapse of lines and other hardware.
- Controlled outages of vulnerable connection points (e.g., substations) or circuits until ash fall has subsided or for de-energised cleaning of equipment.

==== Drinking water supplies ====
Water turbine from the Agoyan hydroelectric plant eroded by volcanic ash laden water

Groundwater-fed systems are resilient to impacts from ashfall, although airborne ash can interfere with the operation of well-head pumps. Electricity outages caused by ashfall can also disrupt electrically powered pumps if there is no backup generation.

The physical impacts of ashfall can affect the operation of water treatment plants. Ash can block intake structures, cause severe abrasion damage to pump impellers and overload pump motors. Ash can enter filtration systems such as open sand filters both by direct fallout and via intake waters. In most cases, increased maintenance will be required to manage the effects of an ashfall, but there will not be service interruptions.

The final step of drinking water treatment is disinfection to ensure that final drinking water is free from infectious microorganisms. As suspended particles (turbidity) can provide a growth substrate for microorganisms and can protect them from disinfection treatment, it is extremely important that the water treatment process achieves a good level of removal of suspended particles. Chlorination may have to be increased to ensure adequate disinfection.

Many households, and some small communities, rely on rainwater for their drinking water supplies. Roof-fed systems are highly vulnerable to contamination by ashfall, as they have a large surface area relative to the storage tank volume. In these cases, leaching of chemical contaminants from the ashfall can become a health risk and drinking of water is not recommended. Prior to an ashfall, downpipes should be disconnected so that water in the tank is protected. A further problem is that the surface coating of fresh volcanic ash can be acidic. Unlike most surface waters, rainwater generally has a very low alkalinity (acid-neutralising capacity) and thus ashfall may acidify tank waters. This may lead to problems with plumbosolvency, whereby the water is more aggressive towards materials that it comes into contact with. This can be a particular problem if there are lead-head nails or lead flashing used on the roof, and for copper pipes and other metallic plumbing fittings.

During ashfall events, large demands are commonly placed on water resources for cleanup and shortages can result. Shortages compromise key services such as firefighting and can lead to a lack of water for hygiene, sanitation and drinking. Municipal authorities need to monitor and manage this water demand carefully, and may need to advise the public to utilise cleanup methods that do not use water (e.g., cleaning with brooms rather than hoses).

==== Wastewater treatment ====
Wastewater networks may sustain damage similar to water supply networks. It is very difficult to exclude ash from the sewerage system. Systems with combined storm water/sewer lines are most at risk. Ash will enter sewer lines where there is inflow/infiltration by stormwater through illegal connections (e.g., from roof downpipes), cross connections, around manhole covers or through holes and cracks in sewer pipes.

Ash-laden sewage entering a treatment plant is likely to cause failure of mechanical prescreening equipment such as step screens or rotating screens. Ash that penetrates further into the system will settle and reduce the capacity of biological reactors as well as increasing the volume of sludge and changing its composition.

==== Aircraft ====
The principal damage sustained by aircraft flying into a volcanic ash cloud is abrasion to forward-facing surfaces, such as the windshield and leading edges of the wings, and accumulation of ash into surface openings, including engines. Abrasion of windshields and landing lights will reduce visibility forcing pilots to rely on their instruments. However, some instruments may provide incorrect readings as sensors (e.g., pitot tubes) can become blocked with ash. Ingestion of ash into engines causes abrasion damage to compressor fan blades. The ash erodes sharp blades in the compressor, reducing its efficiency. The ash melts in the combustion chamber to form molten glass. The ash then solidifies on turbine blades, blocking air flow and causing the engine to stall.

The composition of most ash is such that its melting temperature is within the operating temperature (>1000 °C) of modern large jet engines. The degree of impact depends upon the concentration of ash in the plume, the length of time the aircraft spends within the plume and the actions taken by the pilots. Critically, melting of ash, particularly volcanic glass, can result in accumulation of resolidified ash on turbine nozzle guide vanes, resulting in compressor stall and complete loss of engine thrust. The standard procedure of the engine control system when it detects a possible stall is to increase power which would exacerbate the problem. It is recommended that pilots reduce engine power and quickly exit the cloud by performing a descending 180° turn. Volcanic gases, which are present within ash clouds, can also cause damage to engines and acrylic windshields, and can persist in the stratosphere as an almost invisible aerosol for prolonged periods of time.

===== Occurrence =====
There are many instances of damage to jet aircraft as a result of an ash encounter. On 24 June 1982, British Airways Flight 9 flew through the ash cloud from the eruption of Mount Galunggung, Indonesia resulting in the failure of all four engines. The plane descended 24,000 feet (7,300 m) in 16 minutes before the engines restarted, allowing the aircraft to make an emergency landing. On 15 December 1989, KLM Flight 867 also lost power to all four engines after flying into an ash cloud from Mount Redoubt, Alaska. After dropping 14,700 feet (4,500 m) in four minutes, the engines were started just 1–2 minutes before impact. Total damage was US$80 million and it took 3 months' work to repair the plane. In the 1990s, a further US$100 million of damage was sustained by commercial aircraft (some in the air, others on the ground) as a consequence of the 1991 eruption of Mount Pinatubo in the Philippines.

In April 2010, airspace all over Europe was affected, with many flights cancelled-which was unprecedented-due to the presence of volcanic ash in the upper atmosphere from the eruption of the Icelandic volcano Eyjafjallajökull. On 15 April 2010, the Finnish Air Force halted training flights when damage was found from volcanic dust ingestion by the engines of one of its Boeing F-18 Hornet fighters. In June 2011, there were similar closures of airspace in Chile, Argentina, Brazil, Australia and New Zealand, following the eruption of Puyehue-Cordón Caulle, Chile.

===== Detection =====
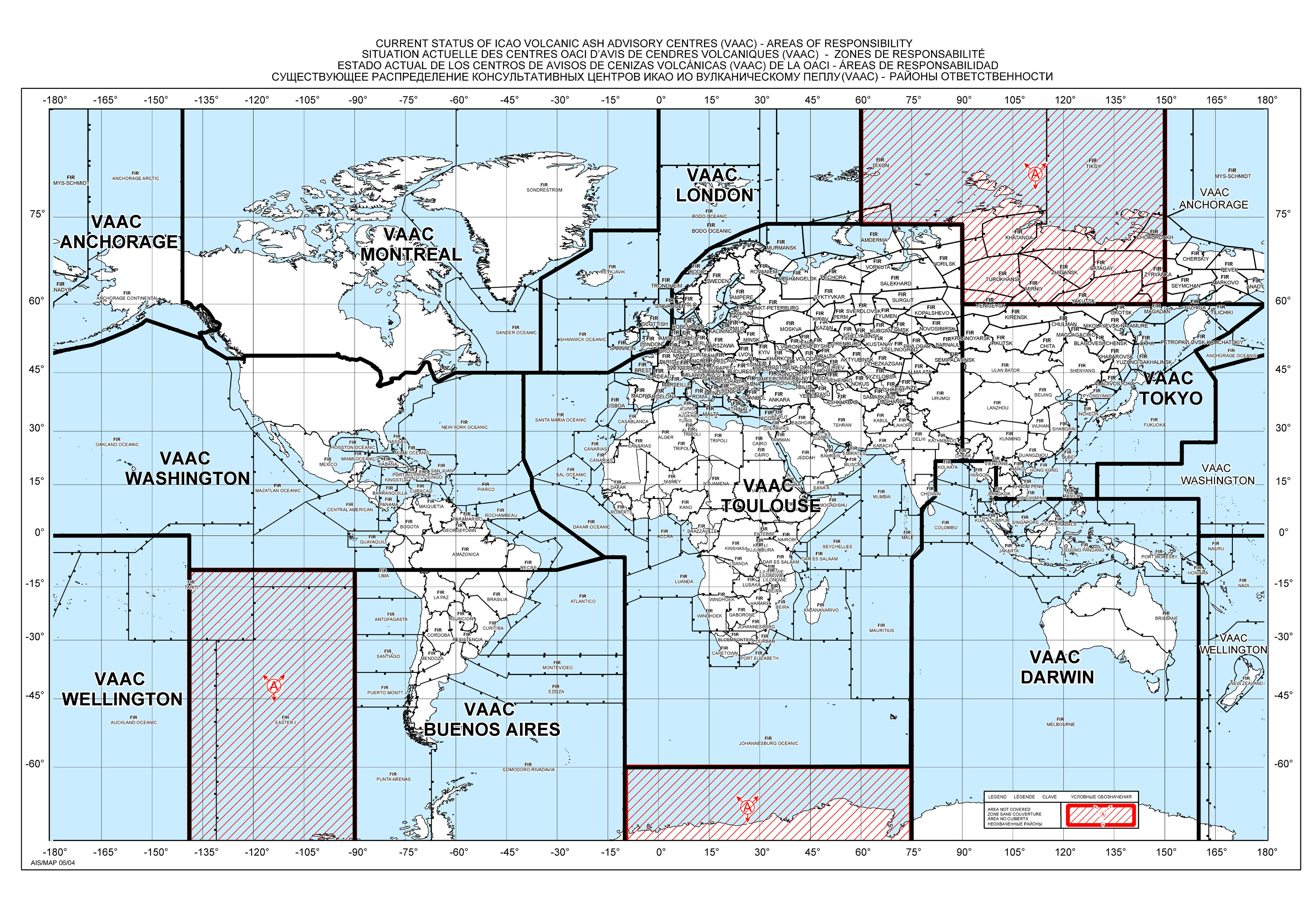
Coverage of the nine VAAC around the world

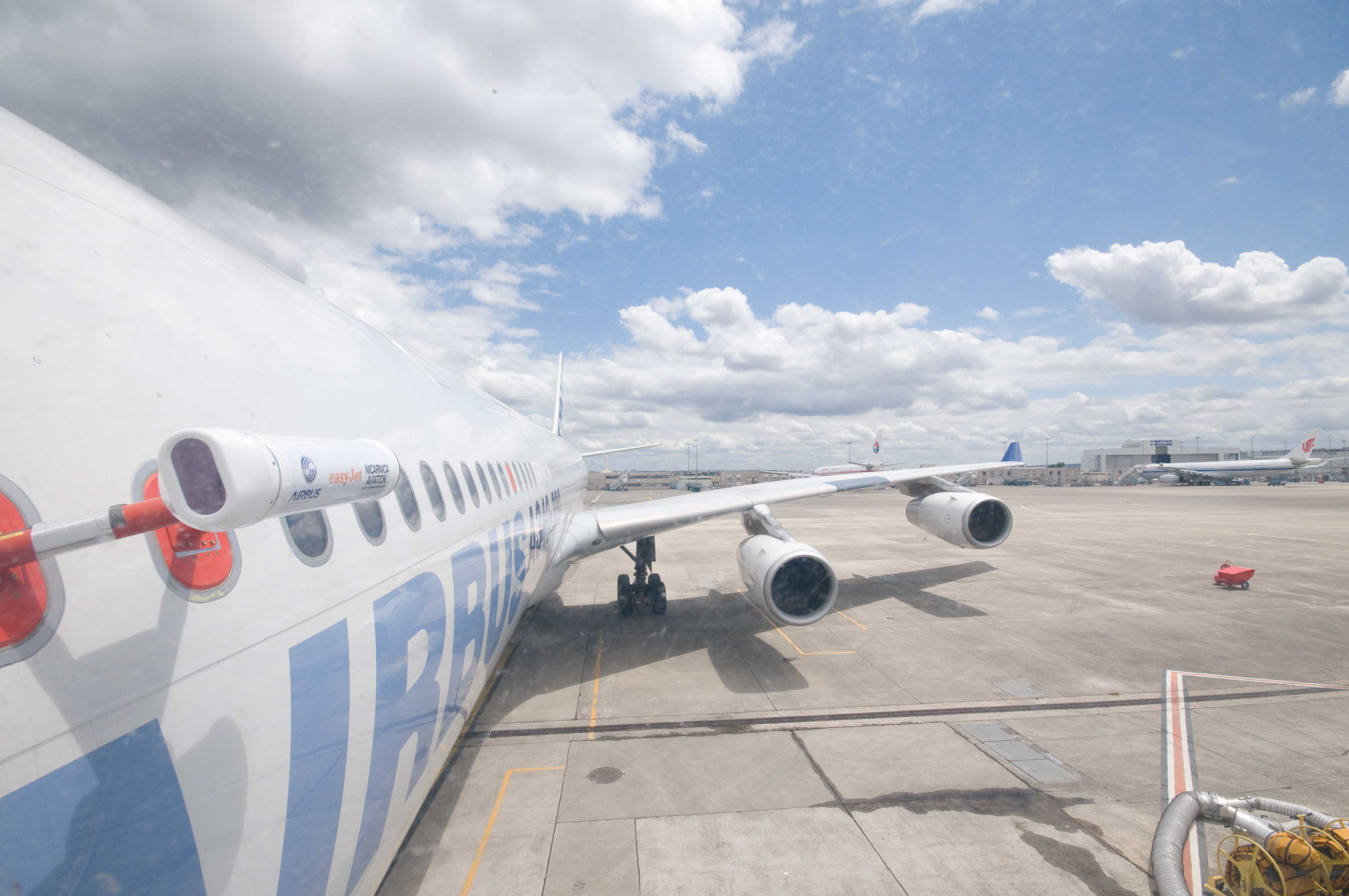
The AVOID instrument mounted on the fuselage of an AIRBUS A340 test aircraft

Volcanic ash clouds are very difficult to detect from aircraft as no onboard cockpit instruments exist to detect them. However, a new system called Airborne Volcanic Object Infrared Detector (AVOID) has recently been developed by Dr Fred Prata while working at CSIRO Australia and the Norwegian Institute for Air Research, which will allow pilots to detect ash plumes up to 60 km (37 mi) ahead and fly safely around them. The system uses two fast-sampling infrared cameras, mounted on a forward-facing surface, that are tuned to detect volcanic ash. This system can detect ash concentrations of <1 mg/m^{3} to > 50 mg/m^{3}, giving pilots approximately 7–10 minutes warning. The camera was tested by the easyJet airline company, AIRBUS and Nicarnica Aviation (co-founded by Dr Fred Prata). The results showed the system could work to distances of ~60 km and up to 10,000 ft but not any higher without some significant modifications.

In addition, ground and satellite based imagery, radar, and lidar can be used to detect ash clouds. This information is passed between meteorological agencies, volcanic observatories and airline companies through Volcanic Ash Advisory Centers (VAAC). There is one VAAC for each of the nine regions of the world. VAACs can issue advisories describing the current and future extent of the ash cloud.

===== Airport systems =====
Volcanic ash not only affects in-flight operations but can affect ground-based airport operations as well. Small accumulations of ash can reduce visibility, produce slippery runways and taxiways, infiltrate communication and electrical systems, interrupt ground services, damage buildings and parked aircraft. Ash accumulation of more than a few millimetres requires removal before airports can resume full operations. Ash does not disappear (unlike snowfalls) and must be disposed of in a manner that prevents it from being remobilised by wind and aircraft.

==== Land transport ====
Ash may disrupt transportation systems over large areas for hours to days, including roads and vehicles, railways and ports and shipping. Falling ash will reduce the visibility which can make driving difficult and dangerous. In addition, fast travelling cars will stir up ash, generating billowing clouds which perpetuate ongoing visibility hazards. Ash accumulations will decrease traction, especially when wet, and cover road markings. Fine-grained ash can infiltrate openings in cars and abrade most surfaces, especially between moving parts. Air and oil filters will become blocked requiring frequent replacement. Rail transport is less vulnerable, with disruptions mainly caused by reduction in visibility.

Marine transport can also be impacted by volcanic ash. Ash fall will block air and oil filters and abrade any moving parts if ingested into engines. Navigation will be impacted by a reduction in visibility during ash fall. Vesiculated ash (pumice and scoria) will float on the water surface in ‘pumice rafts’ which can clog water intakes quickly, leading to over heating of machinery.

==== Communications ====
Telecommunication and broadcast networks can be affected by volcanic ash in the following ways: attenuation and reduction of signal strength; damage to equipment; and overloading of network through user demand. Signal attenuation due to volcanic ash is not well documented; however, there have been reports of disrupted communications following the 1969 Surtsey eruption and 1991 Mount Pinatubo eruption. Research by the New Zealand-based Auckland Engineering Lifelines Group determined theoretically that impacts on telecommunications signals from ash would be limited to low frequency services such as satellite communication. Signal interference may also be caused by lightning, as this is frequently generated within volcanic eruption plumes.

Telecommunication equipment may become damaged due to direct ash fall. Most modern equipment requires constant cooling from air conditioning units. These are susceptible to blockage by ash which reduces their cooling efficiency. Heavy ash falls may cause telecommunication lines, masts, cables, aerials, antennae dishes and towers to collapse due to ash loading. Moist ash may also cause accelerated corrosion of metal components.

Reports from recent eruptions suggest that the largest disruption to communication networks is overloading due to high user demand. This is common of many natural disasters.

==== Computers ====
Computers may be impacted by volcanic ash, with their functionality and usability decreasing during ashfall, but it is unlikely they will completely fail. The most vulnerable components are the mechanical components, such as cooling fans, CD drives, keyboard, mice and touch pads. These components can become jammed with fine grained ash causing them to cease working; however, most can be restored to working order by cleaning with compressed air. Moist ash may cause electrical short circuits within desktop computers; however, will not affect laptop computers.

==== Buildings and structures ====
Damage to buildings and structures can range from complete or partial roof collapse to less catastrophic damage of exterior and internal materials. Impacts depend on the thickness of ash, whether it is wet or dry, the roof and building design and how much ash gets inside a building. The specific weight of ash can vary significantly and rain can increase this by 50–100%. Problems associated with ash loading are similar to that of snow; however, ash is more severe as 1) the load from ash is generally much greater, 2) ash does not melt and 3) ash can clog and damage gutters, especially after rain fall. Impacts for ash loading depend on building design and construction, including roof slope, construction materials, roof span and support system, and age and maintenance of the building. Generally flat roofs are more susceptible to damage and collapse than steeply pitched roofs. Roofs made of smooth materials (sheet metal or glass) are more likely to shed ash than roofs made with rough materials (thatch, asphalt or wood shingles). Roof collapse can lead to widespread injuries and deaths and property damage. For example, the collapse of roofs from ash during the 15 June 1991 Mount Pinatubo eruption killed about 300 people.

=== Environment and agriculture ===
Volcanic ash can have a detrimental impact on the environment which can be difficult to predict due to the large variety of environmental conditions that exist within the ash fall zone. Natural waterways can be impacted in the same way as urban water supply networks. Ash will increase water turbidity which can reduce the amount of light reaching lower depths, which can inhibit growth of submerged aquatic plants and consequently affect species which are dependent on them such as fish and shellfish. High turbidity can also affect the ability of fish gills to absorb dissolved oxygen. Acidification will also occur, which will reduce the pH of the water and impact the fauna and flora living in the environment. Fluoride contamination will occur if the ash contains high concentrations of fluoride.

Ash accumulation will also affect pasture, plants and trees which are part of the horticulture and agriculture industries. Thin ash falls (<20 mm) may put livestock off eating, and can inhibit transpiration and photosynthesis and alter growth. There may be an increase in pasture production due to a mulching effect and slight fertilizing effect, such as occurred following the 1980 Mount St. Helens and 1995/96 Mt Ruapehu eruptions. Heavier falls will completely bury pastures and soil leading to death of pasture and sterilization of the soil due to oxygen deprivation. Plant survival is dependent on ash thickness, ash chemistry, compaction of ash, amount of rainfall, duration of burial and the length of plant stalks at the time of ash fall.

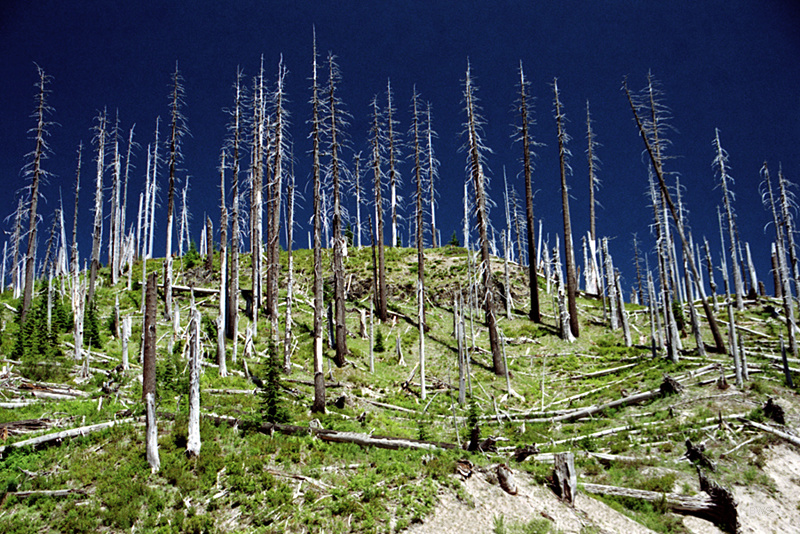
Defoliated and fallen trees on Windy Ridge, Mount St. Helens, 22 years after the 1980 eruption

Young forests (trees <2 years old) are most at risk from ash falls and are likely to be destroyed by ash deposits >100 mm. Ash fall is unlikely to kill mature trees, but ash loading may break large branches during heavy ash falls (>500 mm). Defoliation of trees may also occur, especially if there is a coarse ash component within the ash fall.

Land rehabilitation after ash fall may be possible depending on the ash deposit thickness. Rehabilitation treatment may include: direct seeding of deposit; mixing of deposit with buried soil; scraping of ash deposit from land surface; and application of new topsoil over the ash deposit.

=== Interdependence ===
Interdependency of volcanic ashfall impacts from the Eyjafjallajökull 2010 eruptions

Critical infrastructure and infrastructure services are vital to the functionality of modern society, to provide: medical care, policing, emergency services, and lifelines such as water, wastewater, and power and transportation links. Often critical facilities themselves are dependent on such lifelines for operability, which makes them vulnerable to both direct impacts from a hazard event and indirect effects from lifeline disruption.

The impacts on lifelines may also be inter-dependent. The vulnerability of each lifeline may depend on: the type of hazard, the spatial density of its critical linkages, the dependency on critical linkages, susceptibility to damage and speed of service restoration, state of repair or age, and institutional characteristics or ownership.

The 2010 eruption of Eyjafjallajokull in Iceland highlighted the impacts of volcanic ash fall in modern society and our dependence on the functionality of infrastructure services. During this event, the airline industry suffered business interruption losses of €1.5–2.5 billion from the closure of European airspace for six days in April 2010 and subsequent closures into May 2010. Ash fall from this event is also known to have caused local crop losses in agricultural industries, losses in the tourism industry, destruction of roads and bridges in Iceland (in combination with glacial melt water), and costs associated with emergency response and clean-up. However, across Europe there were further losses associated with travel disruption, the insurance industry, the postal service, and imports and exports across Europe and worldwide. These consequences demonstrate the interdependency and diversity of impacts from a single event.

== Preparedness, mitigation and management ==
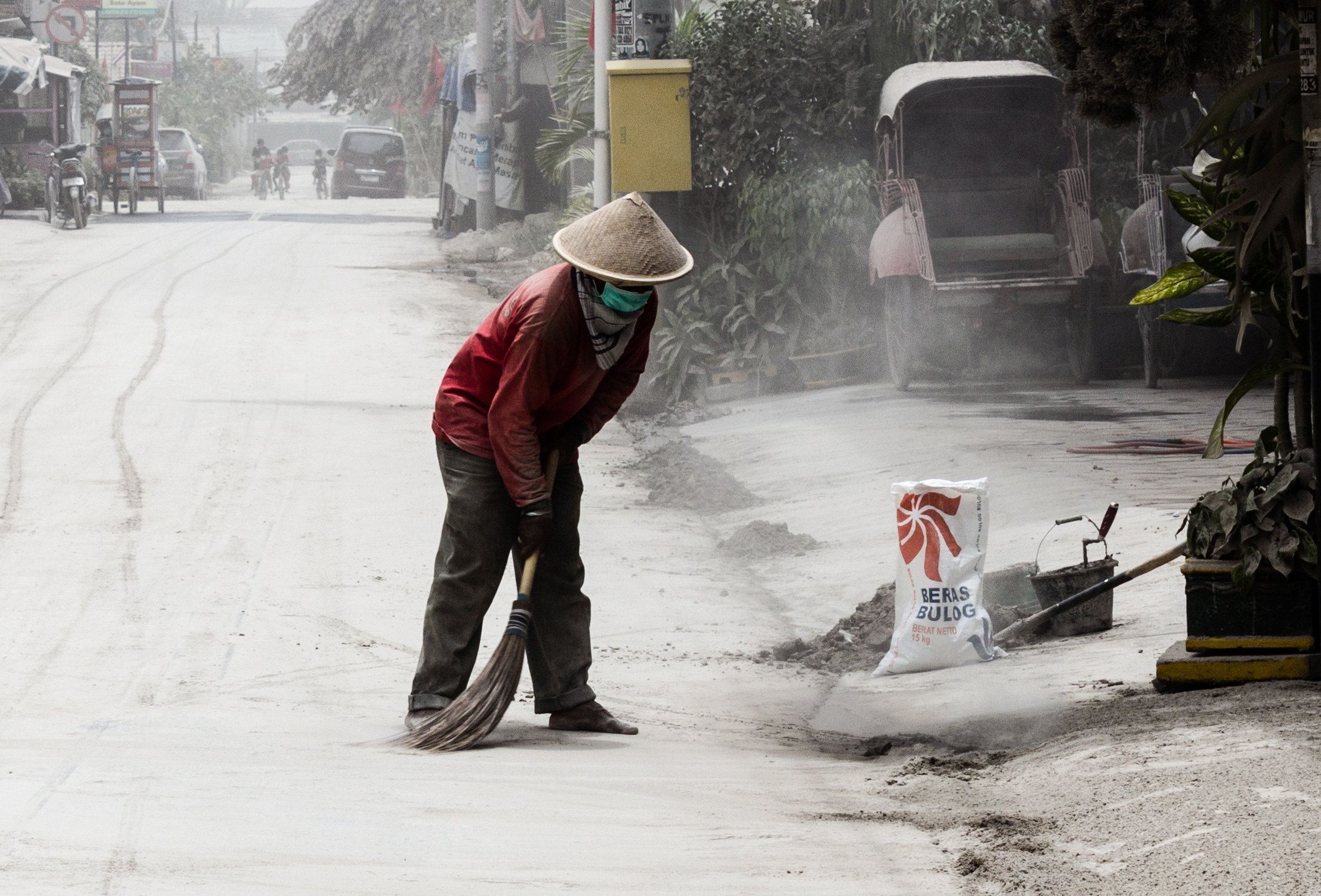
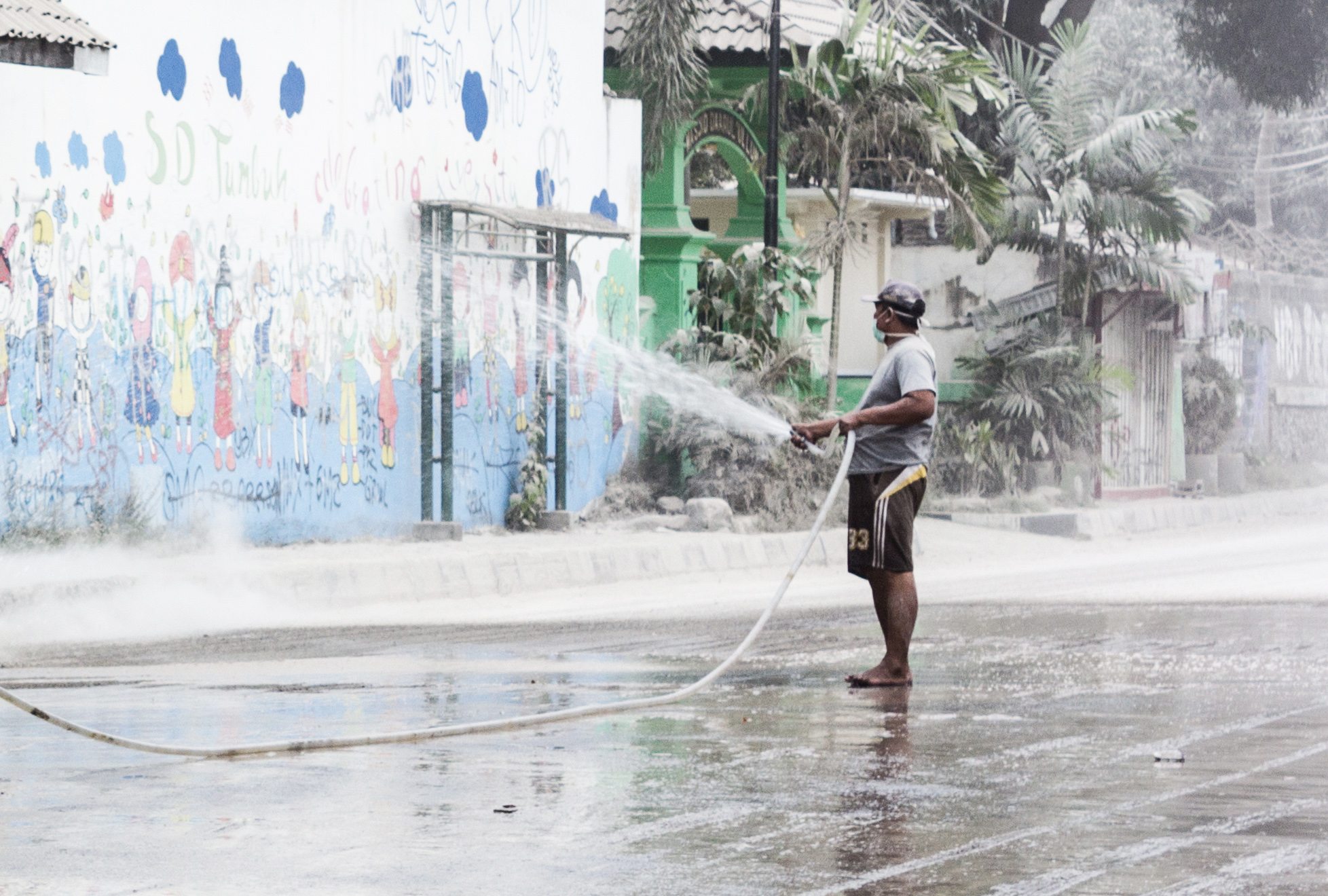
Two management methods during the 2014 eruptions of Kelud: sweeping (top) and spraying with water (bottom)

Preparedness for ashfalls should involve sealing buildings, protecting infrastructure and homes, and storing sufficient supplies of food and water to last until the ash fall is over and clean-up can begin. Dust masks can be worn to reduce inhalation of ash and mitigate against any respiratory health affects. Goggles can be worn to protect against eye irritation.

At home, staying informed about volcanic activity, and having contingency plans in place for alternative shelter locations, constitutes good preparedness for an ash fall event. This can prevent some impacts associated with ash fall, reduce the effects, and increase the human capacity to cope with such events. A few items such as a flashlight, plastic sheeting to protect electronic equipment from ash ingress, and battery operated radios, are extremely useful during ash fall events.

Communication plans should be made beforehand to inform of mitigation actions being undertaken. Spare parts and back-up systems should be in place prior to ash fall events to reduce service disruption and return functionality as quickly as possible. Good preparedness also includes the identification of ash disposal sites, before ash fall occurs, to avoid further movement of ash and to aid clean-up.

Some effective techniques for the management of ash have been developed including cleaning methods and cleaning apparatus, and actions to mitigate or limit damage. The latter include covering of openings such as: air and water intakes, aircraft engines and windows during ash fall events. Roads may be closed to allow clean-up of ash falls, or speed restrictions may be put in place, in order to prevent motorists from developing motor problems and becoming stranded following an ash fall. To prevent further effects on underground water systems or waste water networks, drains and culverts should be unblocked and ash prevented from entering the system. Ash can be moistened (but not saturated) by sprinkling with water, to prevent remobilisation of ash and to aid clean-up. Prioritisation of clean-up operations for critical facilities and coordination of clean-up efforts also constitute good management practice.

It is recommended to evacuate livestock in areas where ashfall may reach 5 cm or more.

== Volcanic ash soils ==
Volcanic ash's primary use is that of a soil enricher. Once the minerals in ash are washed into the soil by rain or other natural processes, it mixes with the soil and forms an andisol layer. This layer is highly rich in nutrients and is very good for agricultural use; the presence of lush forests on volcanic islands is often as a result of trees growing and flourishing in the phosphorus and nitrogen-rich andisol. Volcanic ash can also be used as a replacement for sand.

== See also ==
- Bentonite – Type of claystone, composed of absorbent smectite clay minerals
- Deposition (aerosol physics) – Process by which aerosol particles collect onto solid surfaces
- Energetically modified cement – Class of cements, mechanically processed to transform reactivity
- Helenite – Artificial glass made from volcanic ash
- NOTAM – Aviation notice of potential flight hazards
- Roman concrete – Building material used in ancient Rome
- Tephrochronology – Geochronological technique
- Volcanic ash aggregation
