= Volcanic ash aggregation =

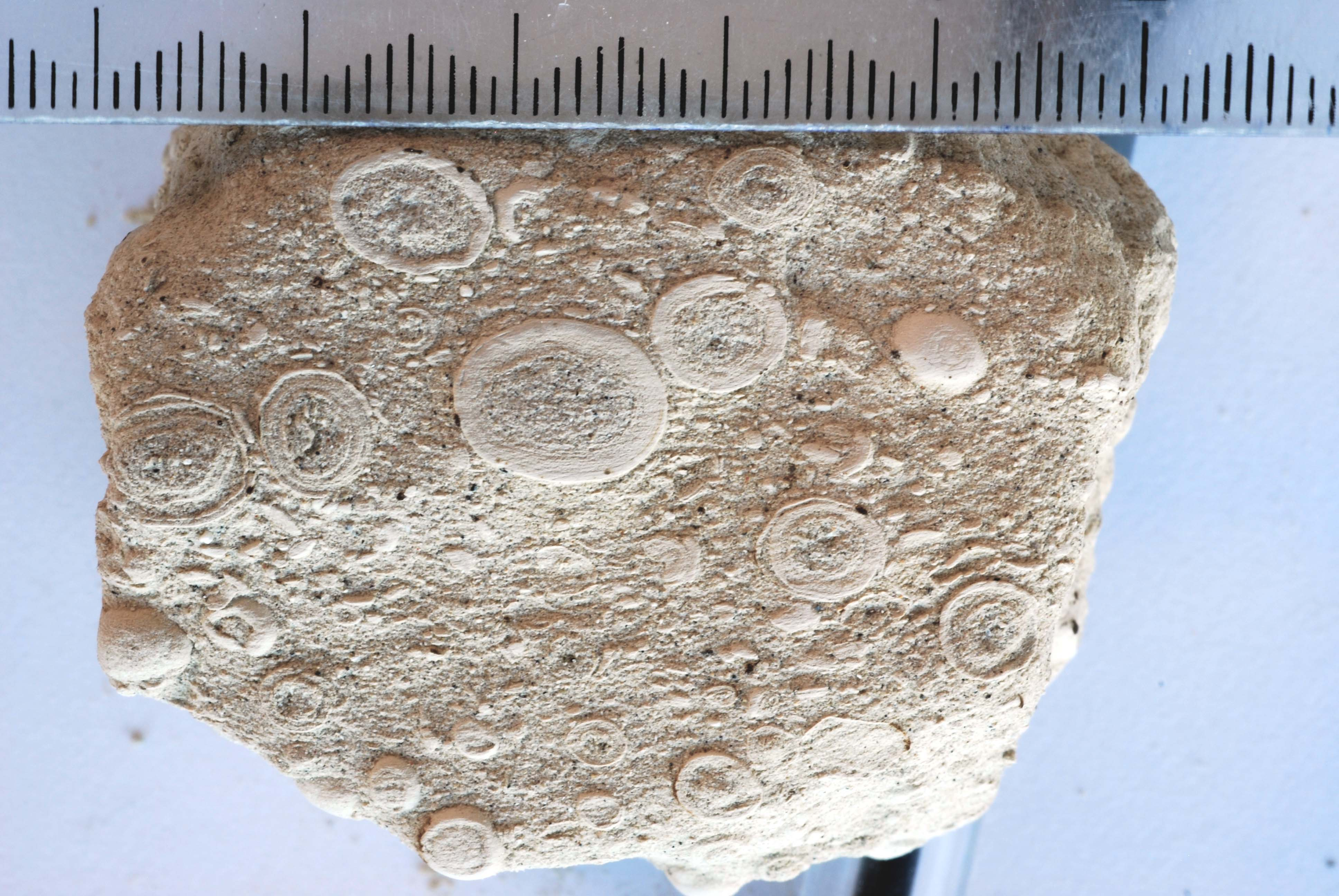
Volcanic ash aggregates (accretionary lapilli) in ignimbrite from the Oruanui eruption of Taupo volcano, New Zealand.

Volcanic ash aggregation occurs when particles of volcanic ash collide and stick together during transport. This process modifies the size distribution of airborne particles, which affects both atmospheric dispersal and fallout patterns on the ground. Aggregation also impacts the dynamics of volcanic plumes, pyroclastic density currents, and their associated hazards.

== Numerical models ==
There are two main approaches to include the effects of ash aggregation in numerical models of ash injection and dispersal. One is to initialize the model with an aggregated grain size distribution, by moving fractions of the erupted mass into larger size bins (for example, the Cornell model). A second approach is a full theoretical description of aggregate growth through time, based on the Smoluchowski coagulation equation. Several methods exist to deal with this equation, including continuous and discrete methods. Continuous methods use the method of moments to track the evolution of a continuous grain size distribution, typically represented by a mean and standard deviation. In contrast, discrete methods use a discretized (binned) grain size distribution. Areas of uncertainty in the numerical schemes include parameterization of the particle sticking efficiency, timescales over which aggregation occurs, and the fraction of erupted mass participating in the aggregation process.
