= Río Murta (volcano) =

Volcano in Chile

Coordinates: 46.17°S 72.708°W

Río Murta is a volcano in Chile.

The volcano consists of a complex of lava flows along the valleys of the Río Murta. These flows display columnar joints, lava tubes and pillow lavas, and have volumes of less than 1 cubic kilometre (0.24 cu mi). These landforms along with the presence of palagonite indicate that the eruptions happened beneath glaciers.

Volcanic activity in the region is in part influenced by the Chile Triple Junction, the point where the Chile Rise is subducted into the Peru-Chile Trench. This point forms a gap in the Andean Volcanic Belt, with Southern Volcanic Zone volcanism north of the gap generated by the fast subduction of the older and colder Nazca Plate beneath the South America Plate and Austral Volcanic Zone volcanism south of the gap formed by the slow subduction of the younger and warmer Antarctic Plate. In between these two subduction processes, a slab window opened up and allowed the rise of alkali basalt magmas.

Río Murta rocks are basalts with a low content of potassium. They contain phenocrysts of clinopyroxene, olivine and plagioclase. The chemical composition is unlike that of other regional basaltic volcanoes, and reflects the influence of oceanic asthenosphere.

The basement in the region is formed by various Paleozoic to Mesozoic sediments and volcanic rocks. The plutons of the Northern Patagonian Batholith were intruded into this basement and may have an origin in the subduction of the Nazca Plate-Farallon Plate.

The age of these flows is controversial. Potassium-argon dating has yielded ages of 900,000 - 850,000 years before present, some flows are too young to date and the relatively well conserved appearance suggest a Holocene age. 40 kilometres (25 mi) northwest of Río Murta lies Cerro Hudson, an active arc volcano.
