= Mate Grande =

Volcano in southern Chile

- Location within Chile

Highest point
- Elevation: 1,280 m (4,200 ft)
- Coordinates: 45°35′28″S 73°07′51″W (highest point)

Geography
- Location: Northeast of Quitralco Fjord, Aysén Region, Chile
- Parent range: Andes

Geology
- Mountain type: Caldera
- Volcanic zone: Southern Volcanic Zone
- Last eruption: Within last 5,000 years

Mate Grande is a volcanic caldera in Aysén Region, southern Chile. The volcano was discovered by geologists of the University of Chile and the discovery announced in 2021. It lies along the Liquiñe-Ofqui Fault. The volcano received the name Mate Grande in honor of the mate drink that is popular in southern Chile. Mate Grande hosts rocks that cooled from lava less than five thousand years old and is thus considered an active volcano. The diameter of caldera is about 5 km.
