= Surtseyan eruption =

Style of reaction between magma and seawater

Surtseyan eruption: 1 water vapor cloud, 2 cypressoid ash jet, 3 crater, 4 water, 5 layers of lava and ash, 6 stratum, 7 magma conduit, 8 magma chamber, 9 dike

A Surtseyan eruption is a type of explosive eruption that takes place in shallow seas or lakes when rapidly rising and fragmenting hot magma interacts explosively with water and with water-steam-tephra slurries. The eruption style is named after an eruption off the southern coast of Iceland in 1963 that caused the emergence of a new volcanic island, Surtsey.

Surtseyan eruptions are phreatomagmatic (also known as hydromagmatic) eruptions, in that they are violently explosive as a result of vigorous interaction between rising magma and lake or sea water. The magma is commonly basaltic and fragments into small pyroclasts (known as 'ash' and 'lapilli'), and these accumulate around the crater to form a small cone or ring-shaped heap. Volcanoes of this type are known as 'tuff cones' and 'tuff rings' because the volcanic ash of which they are made soon solidifies by chemical reaction into a hard rock known as 'tuff'.

Surtseyan eruptions are characteristically unsteady, with phases of rapid repeated short, violent explosions separated by more quiescent phases dominated by steam generation and condensation. Ash and lapilli are emplaced by ash fall (frequently moist or wet), and by short-duration, pyroclastic density currents. The resultant deposits are characteristically well bedded with abundant evidence for moist conditions (e.g. ash aggregates, vesiculated ash layers, and soft-state deformed layers). Much of the wet tephra repeatedly slumps back down into the volcano's crater to be re-ejected by further watery explosions.

== Characteristics ==
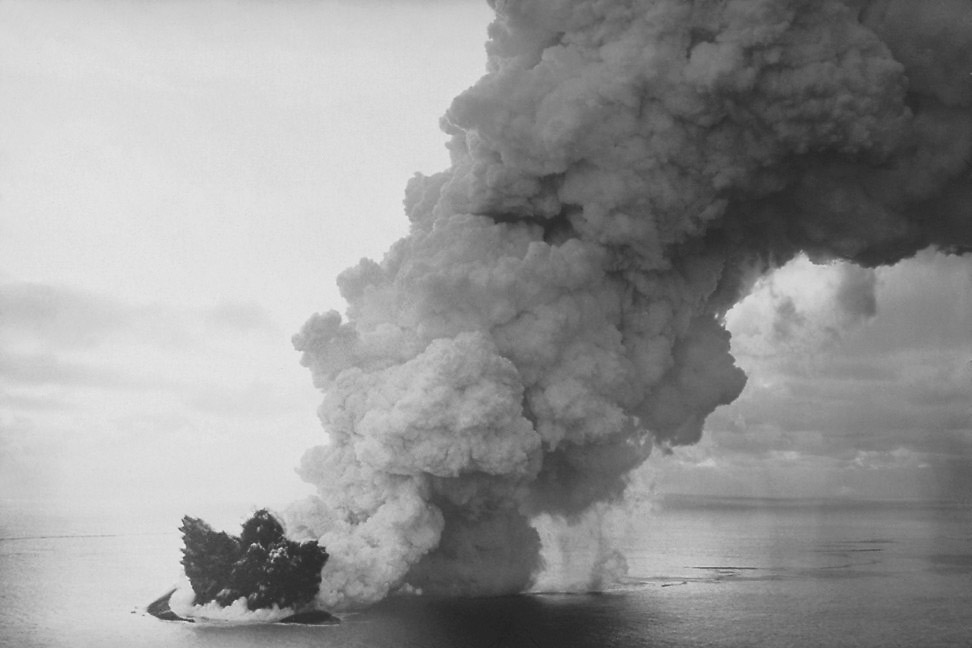
Surtsey is the most famous example of a Surtseyan eruption.

Although similar in nature to phreatomagmatic eruptions, there are several specific characteristics:

- Physical nature of magma: mafic to felsic.
- Character of explosive activity: violent ejection of solid, warm fragments of new magma; continuous or rhythmic explosions; Pumice rafts if intermediate or felsic in composition; base surges.
- Nature of effusive activity: short, locally pillowed, lava flows (which are rare).
- Nature of dominant ejecta: lithic, blocks and ash; pumice (if felsic or intermediate); often accretionary lapilli; spatter, fusiform bombs and scoria lapilli absent.
- Structures built around vent: tuff rings

== Examples of Surtseyan eruptions ==
- Bogoslof Island - Alaska, United States, 1796
- Fire Island - Alaska, United States, 1796
- Graham Island - Sicily, Italy, 1831
- Anak Krakatau - Sunda Strait, Indonesia, 1927–1930 (with smaller eruptions continuing today) - further Surtseyan eruptions took place following the December 2018 eruption which left large sections of the volcano underwater
- Shōwa Iōjima - Iōjima, Kagoshima, Japan, 1934
- Capelinhos - Faial Island, Azores, 1957–1958
- Surtsey - Iceland, 1963
- Jólnir - Iceland, 1966
- Hunga Tonga–Hunga Haʻapai, Tonga, 2009 and 2021–2022 (see 2009 Tonga undersea volcanic eruption and 2022 Hunga Tonga–Hunga Haʻapai eruption and tsunami)
- Zubair Group - Yemen, 2011–2012
- El Hierro - Canary Islands, 2011–2012 (see 2011–12 El Hierro eruption)
- Taal Volcano - Batangas, Philippines 2021-2025 “minor” eruptions
- Fukutoku-Okanoba, Bonin Islands, Japan, 2021
- Iwo Jima, Bonin Islands, Japan, 2022-2024
