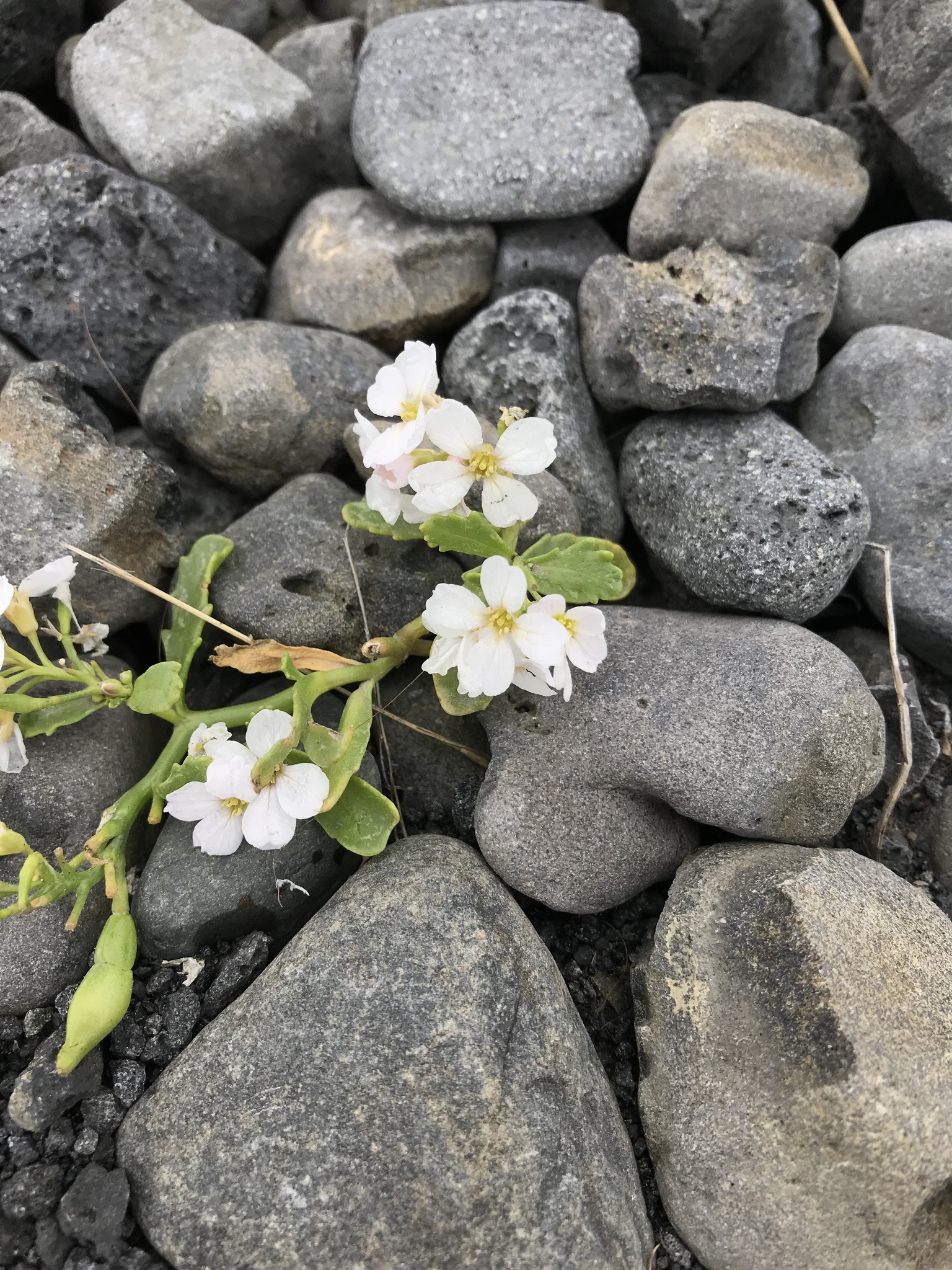

Scientific classification
- Kingdom: Plantae
- Clade: Tracheophytes
- Clade: Angiosperms
- Clade: Eudicots
- Clade: Rosids
- Order: Brassicales
- Family: Brassicaceae
- Genus: Cakile
- Species: C. arctica

Binomial name
- Cakile arctica Pobed.

Synonyms
- Cakile edentula f. islandica (Gand.) O.E.Schulz; Cakile edentula subsp. islandica (Gand.) Á.Löve & D.Löve; Cakile edentula var. islandica (Gand.) Á.Löve; Cakile lanceolata f. pygmaea O.E.Schulz; Cakile lapponica Pobed.; Cakile maritima f. islandica Gand.; Cakile maritima subsp. islandica (Gand.) Elven

= Cakile arctica =

Species of flowering plant

Cakile arctica, commonly known as sea rocket and Fjörukál, is a species of flowering plant in the family Brassicaceae, native to the Faroe Islands, Iceland, Norway (where it is extinct in Svalbard), and North European Russia (as defined in the WGSRPD). It is an annual species, i.e. it germinates, grows, flowers, produces seeds, and dies within one year. Cakile arctica is a pioneer species in primary succession: it was the first vascular plant to colonise Surtsey, a volcanic island 32 km (20 mi) south of Iceland that was formed by eruptions between 1963 and 1967, where it was first observed growing in 1965. Although it was the first vascular plant to grow on Surtsey, as of 1987 it had not established itself on the island.
