= Cakile maritima =

Scientific classification
- Kingdom: Plantae
- Clade: Tracheophytes
- Clade: Angiosperms
- Clade: Eudicots
- Clade: Rosids
- Order: Brassicales
- Family: Brassicaceae
- Genus: Cakile
- Species: C. maritima

Binomial name
- Cakile maritima Scop.

Subspecies
- Cakile maritima subsp. baltica (Jord.) Hyl. ex P.W.Ball; Cakile maritima subsp. euxina (Pobed.) Nyár.; Cakile maritima subsp. integrifolia (Hornem.) Hyl. ex Greuter & Burdet; Cakile maritima subsp. maritima
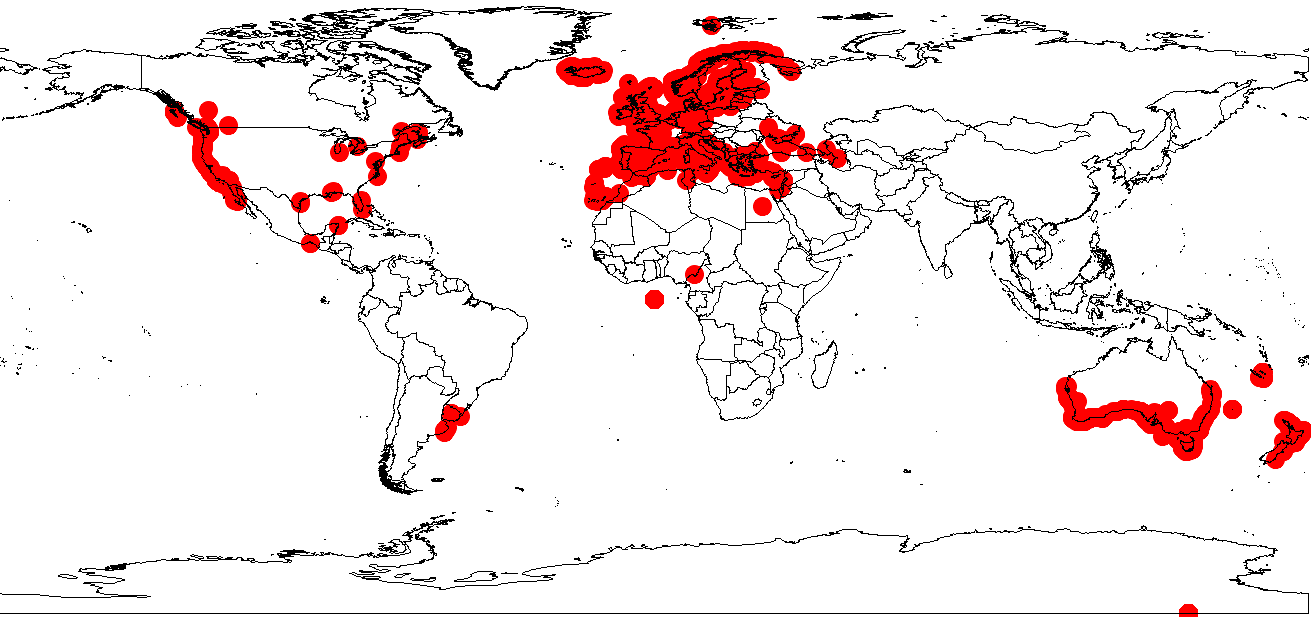
- Occurrence data from GBIF

Synonyms
- Species: Bunias cakile L.; Cakile cakile (L.) H.Karst., not validly publ.; Crucifera cakile (L.) E.H.L.Krause; Rapistrum cakile (L.) Crantz; Rapistrum maritimum (Scop.) Bergeret, nom. superfl.; subsp. baltica: Cakile baltica Jord.; Cakile maritima var. baltica (Jord.) Paol.; Cakile maritima proles baltica (Jord.) Rouy & Foucaud; subsp. euxina: Cakile euxina Pobed.; Cakile maritima var. bipinnata O.E.Schulz; subsp. integrifolia: Cakile maritima var. edentula P.Fourn., nom. illeg.; Cakile maritima var. integrifolia Hornem.; subsp. maritima: Brassica ovalis (Viv.) B.D.Jacks.; Bunias americana Raf.; Bunias littoralis Salisb.; Bunias ovalis Viv.; Cakile aegyptia (L.) Spreng.; Cakile aegyptia var. australis (Coss.) Maire; Cakile aegyptia var. hispanica (Jord.) Maire; Cakile aegyptia var. latifolia (Desf.) Maire; Cakile aegyptia var. littoralis (Jord.) Maire; Cakile aegyptia var. susica (Maire, Weiller & Wilczek) Maire; Cakile aegyptiaca Willd., nom. superfl.; Cakile aegyptica (L.) Maire & Weiller; Cakile aegyptica var. australis (Coss.) Maire; Cakile aegyptica var. edentula (Loret) Maire; Cakile aegyptica var. hispanica (Jord.) Maire; Cakile aegyptica var. latifolia (Desf.) Maire; Cakile aegyptica var. susica (Maire, Weiller & Wilczek) Maire; Cakile bauhini Jord.; Cakile crenata Jord.; Cakile cyrenaica Spreng.; Cakile edentula Jord., nom. illeg.; Cakile hispanica L'Hér. ex DC., pro syn.; Cakile hispanica Jord.; Cakile latifolia (Desf.) Poir.; Cakile littoralis Jord.; Cakile maritima var. aegyptia (L.) Delile; Cakile maritima subsp. aegyptia (L.) Nyman; Cakile maritima subsp. aegyptiaca (Willd.) Nyman; Cakile maritima var. aegyptiaca (Willd.) P.Fourn.; Cakile maritima proles aegyptiaca (Willd.) Rouy & Foucaud; Cakile maritima var. amblycarpa O.E.Schulz; Cakile maritima var. auriculata Post; Cakile maritima var. australis Coss.; Cakile maritima var. edentula Loret; Cakile maritima proles edentula (Loret) Rouy & Foucaud; Cakile maritima proles hispanica (Jord.) Rouy & Foucaud; Cakile maritima var. hispanica (Jord.) Rouy; Cakile maritima var. integrifolia Boiss., nom. illeg.; Cakile maritima var. laciniata Hallier; Cakile maritima var. latifolia Desf.; Cakile maritima subsp. latifolia (Desf.) Arcang.; Cakile maritima var. littoralis (Jord.) P.Fourn.; Cakile maritima var. littoralis (Jord.) Coss.; Cakile maritima proles littoralis (Jord.) Rouy & Foucaud; Cakile maritima var. monosperma (Lange) O.E.Schulz; Cakile maritima var. oxycarpa O.E.Schulz; Cakile maritima var. pandataria N.Terracc.; Cakile maritima f. pandataria (N.Terracc.) O.E.Schulz; Cakile maritima var. pennatifida Paol., nom. illeg.; Cakile maritima var. pinnatifida Delile; Cakile maritima f. pygmaea O.E.Schulz; Cakile maritima var. sessiliflora O.E.Schulz; Cakile maritima var. sinuatifolia (Stokes) DC.; Cakile maritima var. susica Maire, Weiller & Wilczek; Cakile monosperma Lange; Cakile pinnatifida Stokes; Cakile serapionis Gaertn.; Cakile sinuatifolia Stokes; Isatis aegyptia L.; Isatis pinnata Forssk.

Species of flowering plant

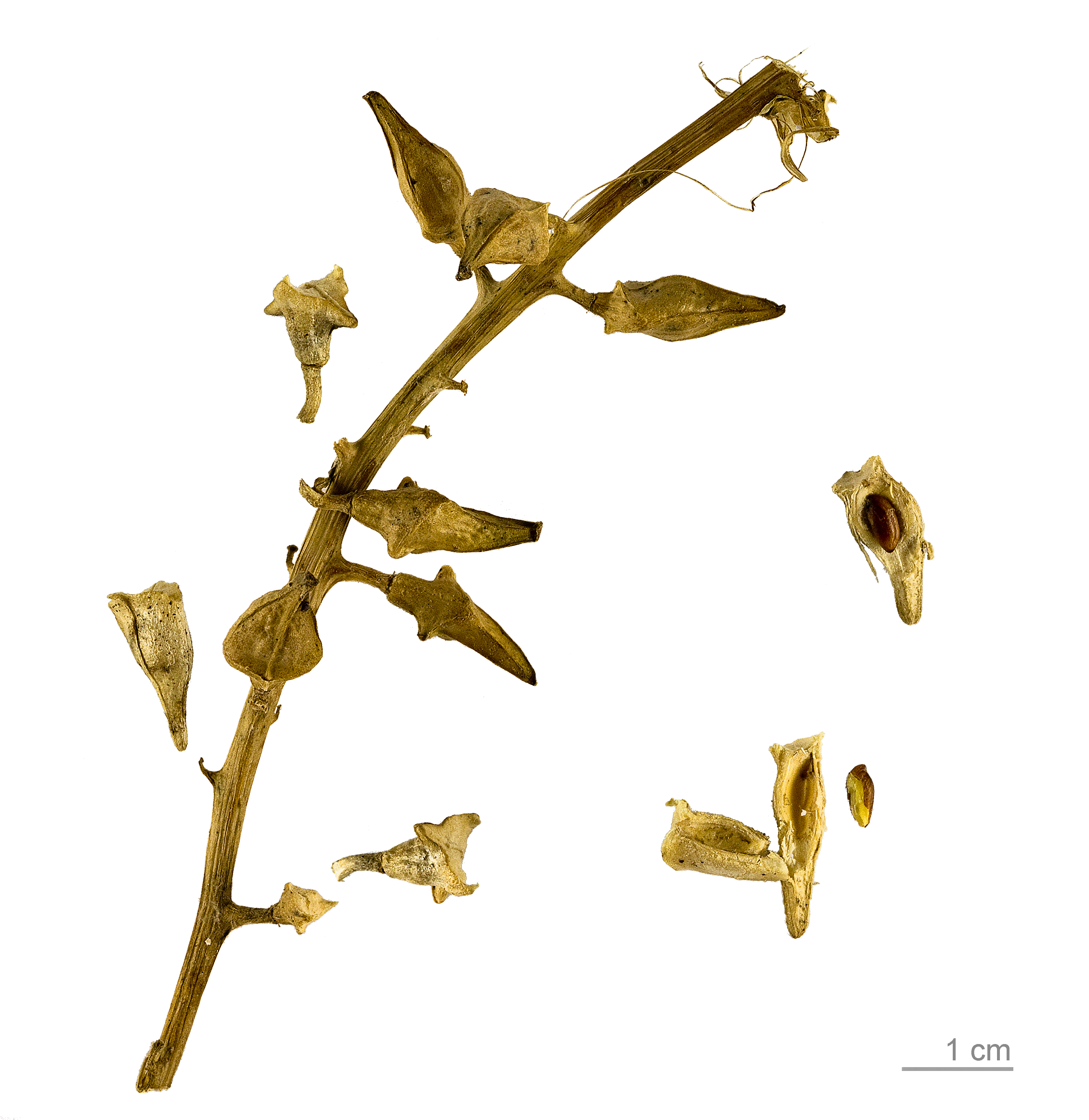
Cakile maritima - MHNT

Cakile maritima, sea rocket (Britain and Ireland) or European searocket (North America), is a common plant in the mustard family Brassicaceae. It is widespread in Europe, North Africa and western Asia, especially on coastlines. It can now be found in many other areas of the world where it has been introduced. It is present on the west and east coasts of North America, where it has the potential to become an invasive species. This is an annual plant which grows in clumps or mounds in the sand on beaches and bluffs. The shiny leaves are fleshy, green and tinted with purple or magenta, and long-lobed. It has white to light purple flowers and sculpted, segmented, corky brown fruits one to three centimetres long. The fruits float and are water-dispersed.

== Description ==
It is a glabrous, succulent annual, with a slender or stout taproot. It has a branched stem which is prostrate or ascending, growing up to 15–45 cm (5.9–17.7 in) long. The lobed leaves, are flesh-like and alternately spaced on the stem. They are different at the top and bottom of the stem; the lower leaves are obovate or oblanceolate, while the upper ones are oblong. It blooms in the UK, between June and August. The small flowers occur in shades of white, lilac-coloured or purple, with 4 petals measuring up to 25 mm (0.98 in) across. Later it produces green maturing to brown, with short, stubby seed capsules. They contain two yellow or brown, smooth seeds. The seed oil contains a high level of erucic acid.

Flowers

Leaves

== Phytochemistry ==
Due to its highly efficient antioxidant system, it can withstand even high doses of Cadmium pollution.

== Taxonomy ==
It was published and described by Giovanni Antonio Scopoli in 'Fl. Carniol.' edition 2, Vol.2 on page 35, in 1772.

The Latin specific epithet maritima means "of the sea".

=== Subspecies ===
As of October 2024, POWO lists the following subspecies:

- Cakile maritima subsp. baltica (Jord.) Hyl. ex P.W.Ball
- Cakile maritima subsp. euxina (Pobed.) Nyár.
- Cakile maritima subsp. integrifolia (Hornem.) Hyl. ex Greuter & Burdet
- Cakile maritima subsp. maritima

== Distribution and habitat ==
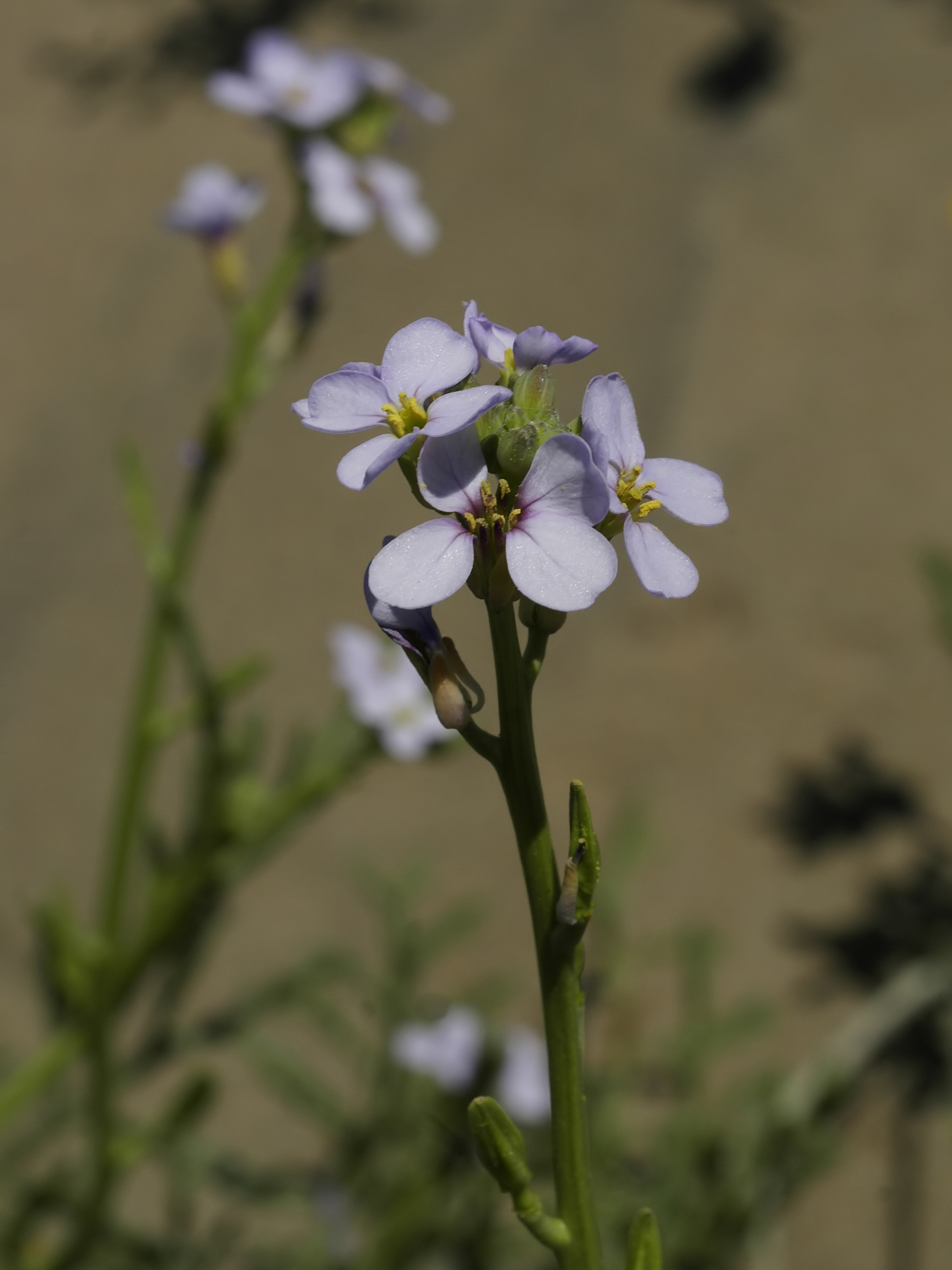
Plant found in the Ebro Delta, Catalonia, Spain

Cakile maritima is native to temperate areas of North Africa, western Asia and Europe.

=== Range ===
It is found in Africa within Algeria, the Canary Islands, Egypt, Libya, the Madeira Islands, Morocco and Tunisia. In Western Asia, it is found in the Caucasus, Georgia, Iran, Palestine, Syria and Turkey. In Eastern Europe, it is found in Estonia and Ukraine. In middle Europe, it is found within Belgium, Germany, the Netherlands and Poland. In Northern Europe, in Denmark, Finland, Iceland, Norway, Sweden and the United Kingdom. In South-eastern Europe, within Albania, Bulgaria, Croatia, Greece, Italy, Montenegro, Romania, Serbia and Slovenia. In Southwestern Europe, within France, Portugal and Spain. It is also widely naturalised outside of its native range, in North America.

=== Habitat ===
Near coastal dunes

It grows on the foreshores near large dune systems, and in shingle banks. It is tolerant of salt spray and transient seawater inundation. It is pollinated by a wide range of insects, from Apis mellifera, Eristalis intricarius and Pieris rapae.

== Veterinary significance ==
As the seed oil contains a high level of erucic acid it can have pathological effects on the cardiac muscle of several animal species. However, orange-bellied parrots feed on its seed during their northward migrating journey from Tasmania and Australia.

== Uses ==
The leaves are edible, preferably cooked, and not eaten in great quantity. The seed oil can be used for industrial applications.

== Gallery ==
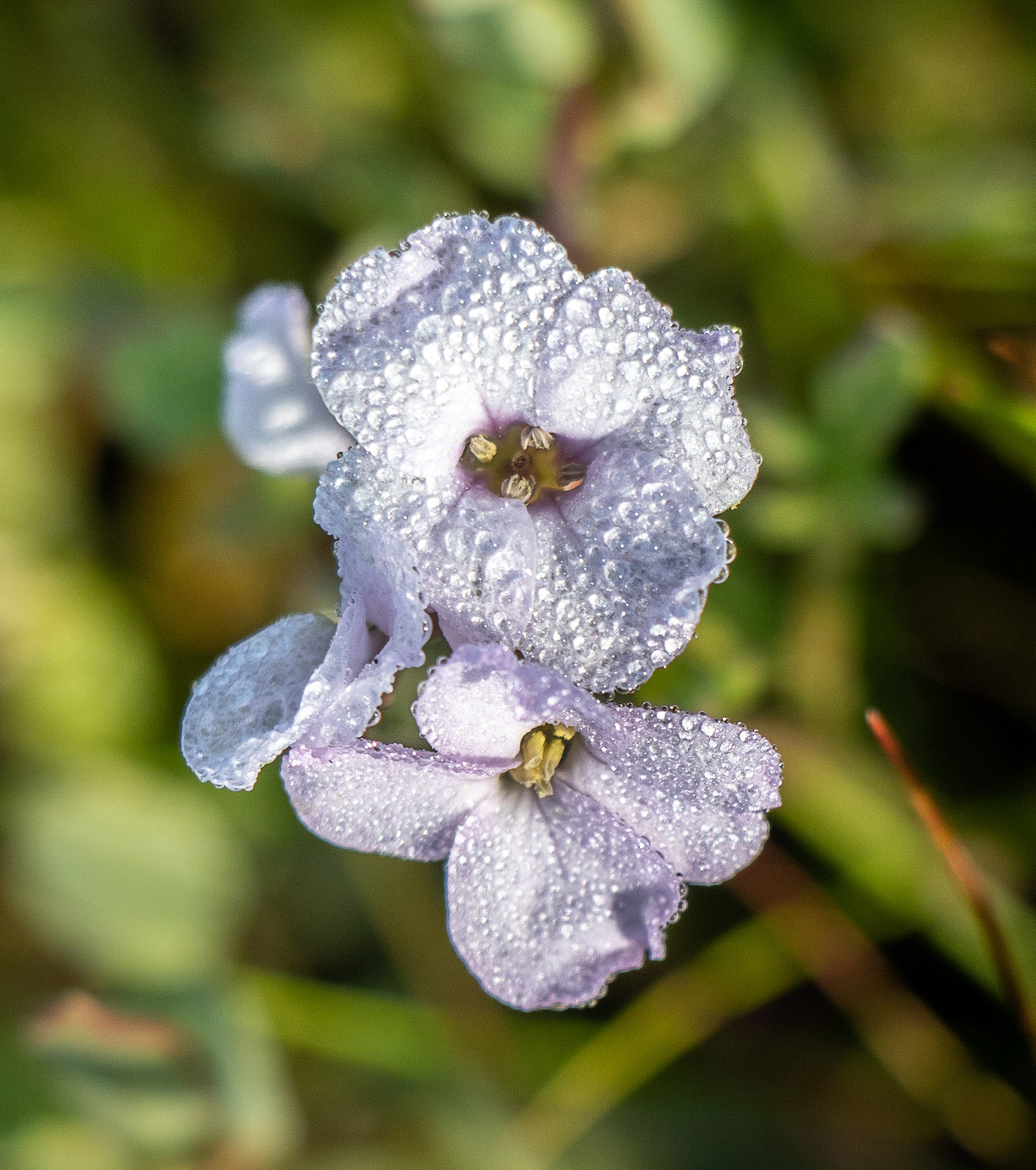
Flowers

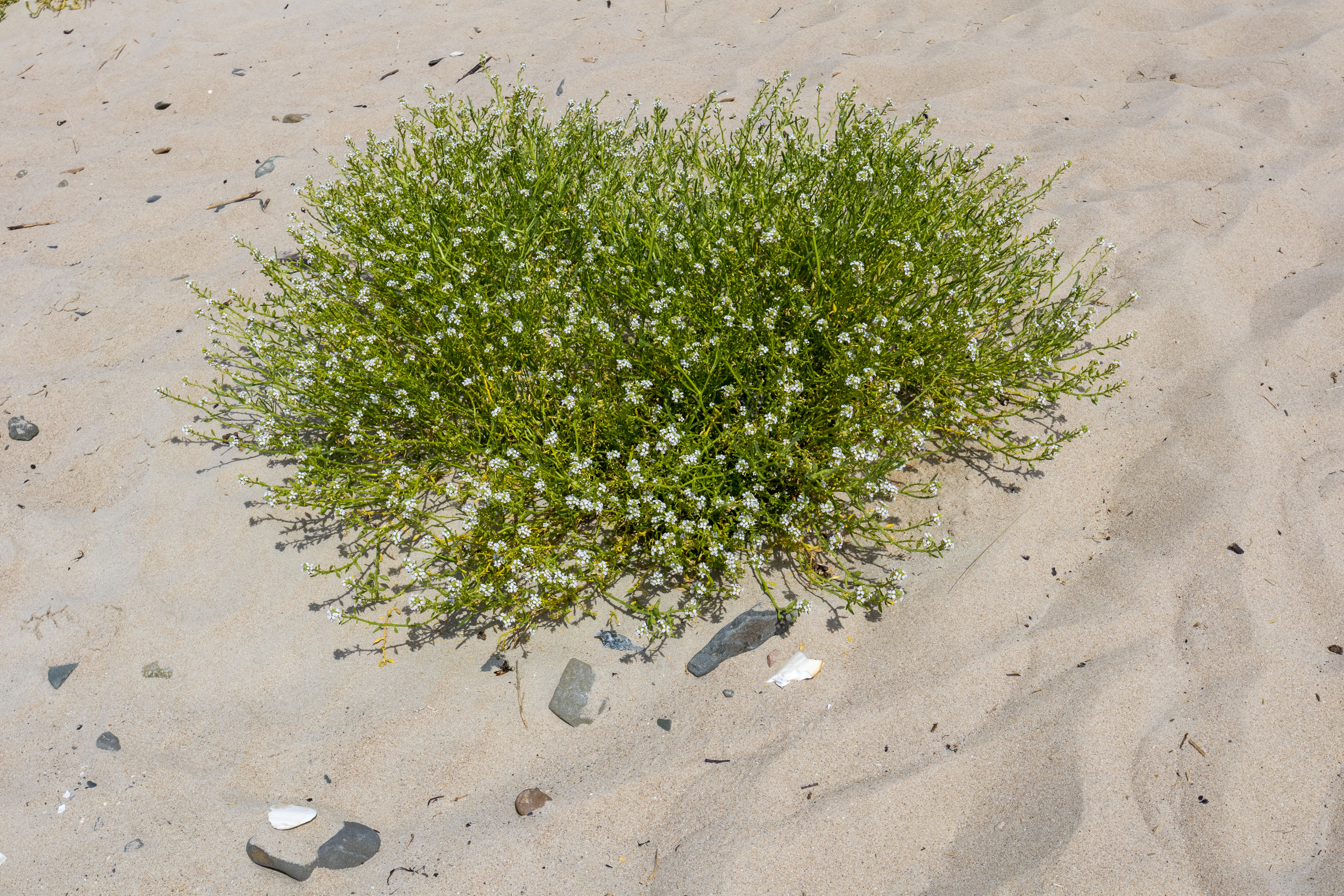
Cakile maritima
