= Surtsey =

Volcanic island off the coast of Iceland

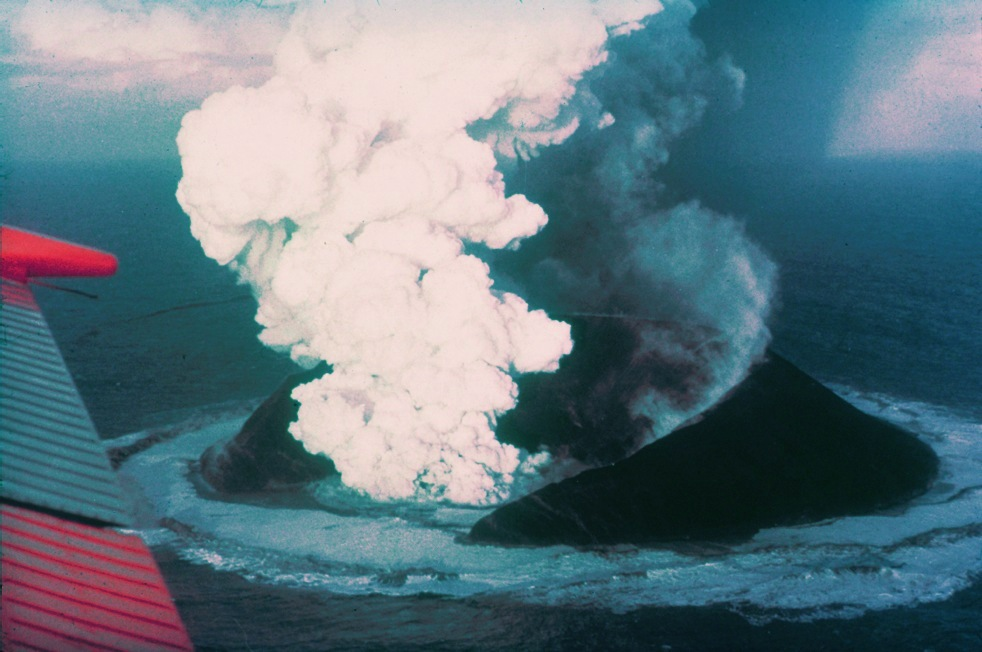
- Surtsey, sixteen days after the onset of the eruption

- Map of Surtsey

- Location of Surtsey in Iceland

Geography
- Location: Atlantic Ocean
- Archipelago: Vestmannaeyjar
- Area: 1.4 km^{2} (0.54 sq mi)
- Highest elevation: 155 m (509 ft)

Administration
- Iceland

Additional information
- Official website: surtsey.is

UNESCO World Heritage Site
- Criteria: Natural: ix
- Reference: 1267
- Inscription: 2008 (32nd Session)
- Area: 3,370 ha (8,300 acres)
- Buffer zone: 3,190 ha (7,900 acres)

Surtsey ("Surtr's island" in Icelandic, Icelandic pronunciation: [ˈsʏr̥(t)sˌeiː]) is an uninhabited volcanic island located in the Vestmannaeyjar archipelago off the southern coast of Iceland. At 63.303°N 20.605°W Surtsey is the southernmost point of Iceland. It was formed in a volcanic eruption which began 130 metres (430 feet) below sea level, and reached the surface on 14 November 1963. The eruption lasted until 5 June 1967, when the island reached its maximum size of 2.7 km^{2} (1.0 sq mi). Since then, wave erosion has caused the island to steadily diminish in size: as of 2012, its surface area was 1.3 km^{2} (0.50 sq mi). The most recent survey (2007) shows the island's maximum elevation at 155 m (509 ft) above sea level.

The new island was named after Surtr, a fire jötunn or giant from Norse mythology. It was intensively studied by volcanologists during its eruption, and afterwards by botanists and other biologists as life forms gradually colonised the originally barren island. The undersea vents that produced Surtsey are part of the Vestmannaeyjar submarine volcanic system, part of the fissure of the sea floor called the Mid-Atlantic Ridge. Vestmannaeyjar also produced the famous eruption of Eldfell on the island of Heimaey in 1973. The eruption that created Surtsey also created a few other small islands along this volcanic chain, such as Jólnir and other, unnamed peaks. Most of these eroded away fairly quickly. It is estimated that Surtsey will remain above sea level until at least the year 2100.

== Geology ==
=== Formation ===
Scheme of the Surtseyan eruption
| 1: Water vapour cloud |
2: Cypressoid ash jet
3: Crater
4: Water
5: Layers of lava and ash
6: Stratum
7: Magma conduit
8: Magma chamber
9: Dike

The eruption was unexpected, and almost certainly began some days before it became apparent at the surface. The sea floor at the eruption site is 130 metres (430 feet) below sea level, and at this depth volcanic emissions and explosions would be suppressed, quenched and dissipated by the water pressure and density. Gradually, as repeated flows built up a mound of material that approached sea level, the explosions could no longer be contained, and activity broke the surface.

The first noticeable indications of volcanic activity were recorded at the seismic station in Kirkjubæjarklaustur, Iceland from 6 to 8 November 1963, which detected weak tremors emanating from an epicentre approximately west-south-west at a distance of 140 km (87 mi), the location of Surtsey. Another station in Reykjavík recorded even weaker tremors for ten hours on 12 November at an undetermined location, when seismic activity ceased until 21 November. That same day, people in the coastal town of Vík 80 km (50 mi) away noticed a smell of hydrogen sulphide. On 13 November, a fishing vessel in search of herring, equipped with sensitive thermometers, noted sea temperatures 3.2 km (2.0 mi) SW of the eruption center were 2.4 °C (4.3 °F) higher than surrounding waters.

==== Eruption at the surface ====
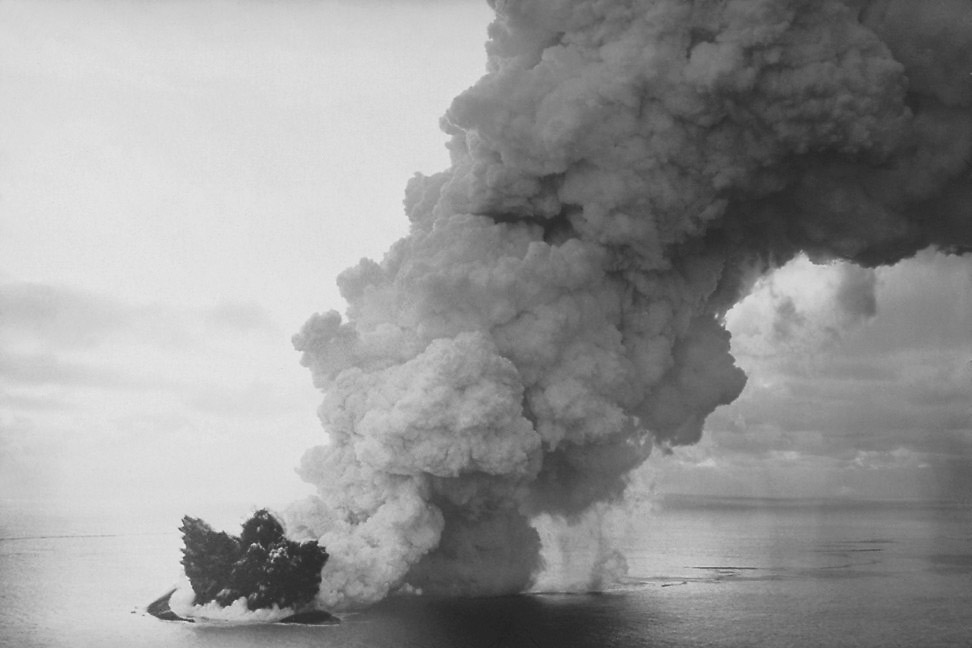
Surtsey's ash column rises over the forming island

At 07:15 UTC on 14 November 1963, the cook of Ísleifur II, a trawler sailing these same waters, spotted a rising column of dark smoke southwest of the boat. The captain thought it might have been a boat on fire, and ordered his crew to investigate. Instead, they encountered explosive eruptions giving off black columns of ash, indicating that a volcanic eruption had begun to breach the surface of the sea. By 11:00 the same day, the eruption column had reached several metres in height. At first the eruptions took place at three separate vents along a northeast by southwest trending fissure, but by the afternoon the separate eruption columns had merged into one along the erupting fissure. Over the next week, explosions were continuous, and after just a few days the new island, formed mainly of scoria, measured over 500 metres (1,640 feet) in length and had reached a height of 45 metres (148 feet).

As the eruptions continued, they became concentrated at one vent along the fissure and began to build the island into a more circular shape. By 24 November, the island measured about 900 by 650 metres (2,950 by 2,130 ft). The violent explosions caused by the meeting of lava and sea water meant that the island consisted of a loose pile of volcanic rock (scoria), which was eroded rapidly by North Atlantic storms during the winter. However, eruptions more than kept pace with wave erosion, and by February 1964, the island had a maximum diameter of over 1,300 metres (4,265 feet).

The explosive phreatomagmatic eruptions caused by the easy access of water to the erupting vents threw rocks up to a kilometre (0.6 mi) away from the island, and sent ash clouds as high as 10 km (6.2 mi) up into the atmosphere. The loose pile of unconsolidated tephra would quickly have been washed away had the supply of fresh magma dwindled, and large clouds of dust were often seen blowing away from the island during this stage of the eruption.

The new island was named after the fire jötunn Surtur from Norse mythology (Surts is the genitive case of Surtur, plus -ey, island) by the Icelandic Naming Committee. Three French journalists representing the magazine Paris Match notably landed there on 6 December 1963, staying for about 15 minutes before violent explosions encouraged them to leave. The journalists jokingly claimed French sovereignty over the island, but Iceland quickly asserted that the new island belonged to it.

==== Permanent island ====
By early 1964, the continuing eruptions had built the island to such a size that sea water could no longer easily reach the vents, and the volcanic activity became much less explosive. Instead, lava fountains and flows became the main form of activity. These resulted in a hard cap of extremely erosion-resistant rock being laid down on top of much of the loose volcanic pile, which prevented the island from being washed away rapidly. Effusive eruptions continued until 1965, by which time the island had a surface area of 2.5 km^{2} (0.97 sq mi).

On 28 December 1963, submarine activity to the northeast of Surtsey began, causing the formation of a ridge 100 m (330 ft) high on the sea floor. This seamount was named Surtla [ˈsʏr̥tla], but never reached sea level. Eruptions at Surtla ended on 6 January 1964, and it has since been eroded from its minimum depth of 23 to 47 m (75 to 154 ft) below sea level.

==== Subsequent volcanic activity ====
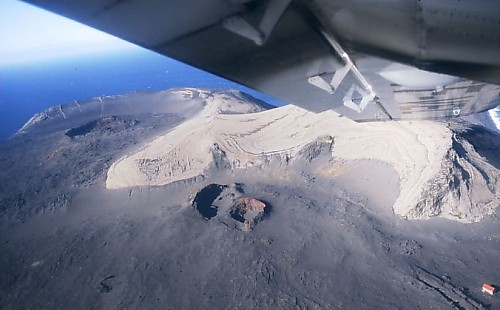
The eruption vents in 1999

In 1965, the activity on the main island diminished, but at the end of May that year an eruption began at a vent 0.6 km (0.37 mi) off the northern shore. By 28 May, an island had appeared, and was named Syrtlingur ([ˈsɪr̥tliŋkʏr̥] Little Surtsey). The new island was washed away during early June, but reappeared on 14 June. Eruptions at Syrtlingur were much smaller in scale than those that had built Surtsey, with the average rate of emission of volcanic materials being about a tenth of the rate at the main vent. Activity was short-lived, continuing until the beginning of October 1965, by which time the islet had an area of 0.15 km^{2} (0.058 sq mi). Once the eruptions had ceased, wave erosion rapidly wore the island away, and it disappeared beneath the waves on 24 October.

During December 1965, more submarine activity occurred 0.9 km (0.56 mi) southwest of Surtsey, and another island was formed. It was named Jólnir, and over the following eight months it appeared and disappeared several times, as wave erosion and volcanic activity alternated in dominance. Activity at Jólnir was much weaker than the activity at the main vent, and even weaker than that seen at Syrtlingur, but the island eventually grew to a maximum size of 70 m (230 ft) in height, covering an area of 0.3 km^{2} (0.12 sq mi), during July and early August 1966. Like Syrtlingur, though, after activity ceased on 8 August 1966, it was rapidly eroded, and dropped below sea level during October 1966.

Effusive eruptions on the main island returned on 19 August 1966, with fresh lava flows giving it further resistance to erosion. The eruption rate diminished steadily, though, and on 5 June 1967, the eruption ended. The volcano has been dormant ever since. The total volume of lava emitted during the three-and-a-half-year eruption was about one cubic kilometre (0.24 cu mi), and the island's highest point was 174 metres (571 feet) above sea level at that time.

Since the end of the eruption, erosion has seen the island diminish in size. A large area on the southeast side has been eroded away completely, while a sand spit called Norðurtangi (north point) has grown on the north side of the island. It is estimated that about 0.024 km^{3} (0.0058 cu mi) of material has been lost due to erosion—this represents about a quarter of the original above-sea-level volume of the island. Its maximum elevation has diminished to 155 m (509 ft).

== Recent development ==
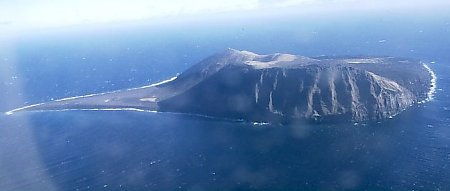
The island of Surtsey in 1999

North spit of Surtsey in January 2009

Following the end of the eruption, scientists established a grid of benchmarks against which they measured the change in the shape of the island. In the 20 years following the end of the eruption, measurements revealed that the island was steadily subsiding and had lost about one metre in height. The rate of subsidence was initially about 20 cm (8 in) per year but slowed to 1–2 cm (0.39–0.79 in) a year by the 1990s. It had several causes: settling of the loose tephra forming the bulk of the volcano, compaction of sea floor sediments underlying the island, and downward warping of the lithosphere due to the weight of the volcano.

Volcanoes in the Vestmannaeyjar archipelago are typically monogenetic, and so the island is unlikely to be enlarged in the future by further eruptions. The heavy seas around the island have been eroding it ever since the island appeared, and since the end of the eruption almost half of its original area has been lost. The island currently loses about 1.0 hectare (2.5 acres) of its surface area each year.

=== Future ===
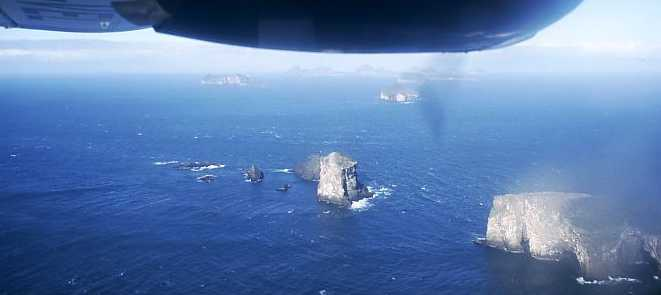
Other islands in the archipelago show the effects of centuries of erosion

As a suspected part of the Iceland plume, this island is unlikely to disappear entirely in the near future. The eroded area consisted mostly of loose tephra, easily washed away. Most of the remaining area is capped by hard lava flows, which are much more resistant to erosion. In addition, complex chemical reactions within the loose tephra within the island have gradually formed highly erosion-resistant tuff material, in a process known as palagonitization. On Surtsey, this process has happened quite rapidly, due to high temperatures not far below the surface.

Estimates of how long Surtsey will survive are based on the rate of erosion seen up to the present day. Assuming that the current rate does not change, the island will be mostly at or below sea level by 2100. However, the rate of erosion is likely to slow as the tougher core of the island is exposed: an assessment assuming that the rate of erosion will slow exponentially suggests that the island will survive for many centuries. An idea of what it will look like in the future is given by the other small islands in the Vestmannaeyjar archipelago, which formed in the same way as Surtsey several thousand years ago, and have eroded away substantially since they were formed.

== Biology ==
=== Settlement of life ===
A classic site for the study of biocolonisation from founder populations, Surtsey was declared a nature reserve in 1965, while the eruption was still in progress. Today only a few scientists are permitted to land on Surtsey; the only way anyone else can see it closely is from a small plane. This allows the natural ecological succession for the island to proceed without outside interference. In 2008, UNESCO declared the island a World Heritage Site, in recognition of its great scientific value.

==== Plant life ====
In the spring of 1965, the first vascular plant, Cakile arctica, was found growing on the northern shore of Surtsey. In 1967, the first 2 moss species, Funaria hygrometrica and Bryum argenteum, were found, and the first lichens were found on the Surtsey lava in 1970. Plant colonisation on Surtsey has been closely studied, the vascular plants in particular as they have been of far greater significance than mosses, lichens and fungi in the development of vegetation.

Mosses and lichens now cover much of the island. During the island's first 20 years, 20 species of plants were observed at one time or another, but only 10 became established in the nutrient-poor sandy soil. As birds began nesting on the island, soil conditions improved, and more vascular plant species were able to survive. In 1998, the first bush was found on the island, being a species of willow (Salix ssp.)—a tea-leaved willow (Salix phylicifolia), which can grow to heights of up to 4 metres (13 feet). By 2008, 69 species of plant had been found on Surtsey, of which about 30 had become established. This compares to the approximately 490 species found on mainland Iceland. More species continue to arrive, at a typical rate of roughly 2–5 new species per year.

==== Bird life ====
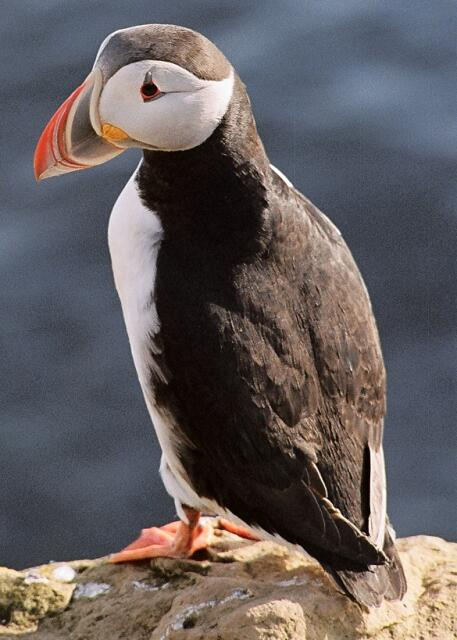
The first puffin nests were found on Surtsey in 2004

The expansion of bird life on the island has both relied on and helped to advance the spread of plant life. Birds use the plants for nesting material, but also continue to assist in the spreading of seeds, and fertilize the soil with their guano. Birds first began nesting on Surtsey three years after the eruptions ended, with northern fulmar (Fulmarus glacialis) and black guillemot (Cepphus grylle) being the first species to set up home. Twelve species are now regularly found on the island.

A gull colony has been present since 1984, although gulls were seen briefly on the shores of the new island weeks after it first appeared. The gull colony has been particularly important in developing the plant life on Surtsey, and the gulls have had much more of an impact on plant colonisation than other breeding species due to their abundance. An expedition in 2004 found the first evidence of nesting Atlantic puffins (Fratercula arctica), which are abundant in the rest of the archipelago.

As well as providing a home for some species of birds, Surtsey has also been used as a stopping-off point for migrating birds, particularly those en route between Europe and Iceland. Species that have been seen briefly on the island include whooper swans (Cygnus cygnus), various species of geese, and common ravens (Corvus corax). Although Surtsey lies to the west of the main migration routes to Iceland, it has become a more common stopping point as its vegetation has improved. In 2008, the 14th breeding bird species was detected with the discovery of a common raven's nest.

According to a 30 May 2009 report, a European golden plover (Pluvialis apricaria) was nesting on the island, with four eggs.

==== Marine life ====
Soon after the island's formation, seals were seen around the island. They soon began basking there, particularly on the northern spit, which grew as the waves eroded the island. Seals were found to be breeding on the island in 1983, and a group of up to 70 made the island their breeding spot. Grey seals are more common on the island than harbour seals, but both are now well established. The presence of seals attracts orcas, which are frequently seen in the waters around the Vestmannaeyjar archipelago and now frequent the waters around Surtsey.

On the submarine portion of the island, many marine species are found. Starfish are abundant, as are sea urchins and limpets. The rocks are covered in algae, and seaweed covers much of the submarine slopes of the volcano, with its densest cover between 10 and 20 metres (33 and 66 ft) below sea level.

==== Other life ====
Insects arrived on Surtsey soon after its formation, and were first detected in 1964. The original arrivals were flying insects, carried to the island by winds and their own power. Some were believed to have been blown across from as far away as mainland Europe. Later insect life arrived on floating driftwood, and both live animals and carcasses washed up on the island. When a large, grass-covered tussock washed ashore in 1974, scientists took half of it for analysis and discovered 663 land invertebrate specimens, mostly mites and springtails, the great majority of which had survived the crossing.

The establishment of insect life provided some food for birds, and birds in turn helped many species to become established on the island. The bodies of dead birds provide sustenance for carnivorous insects, while the fertilisation of the soil and resulting promotion of plant life provides a viable habitat for herbivorous insects.

The first earthworm was found in a soil sample in 1993, probably carried over from Heimaey by a bird. However, the next year no earthworms were found. Slugs were found in 1998, and appeared to be similar to varieties found in the southern Icelandic mainland. Spiders and beetles have also become established.

== Human impact ==
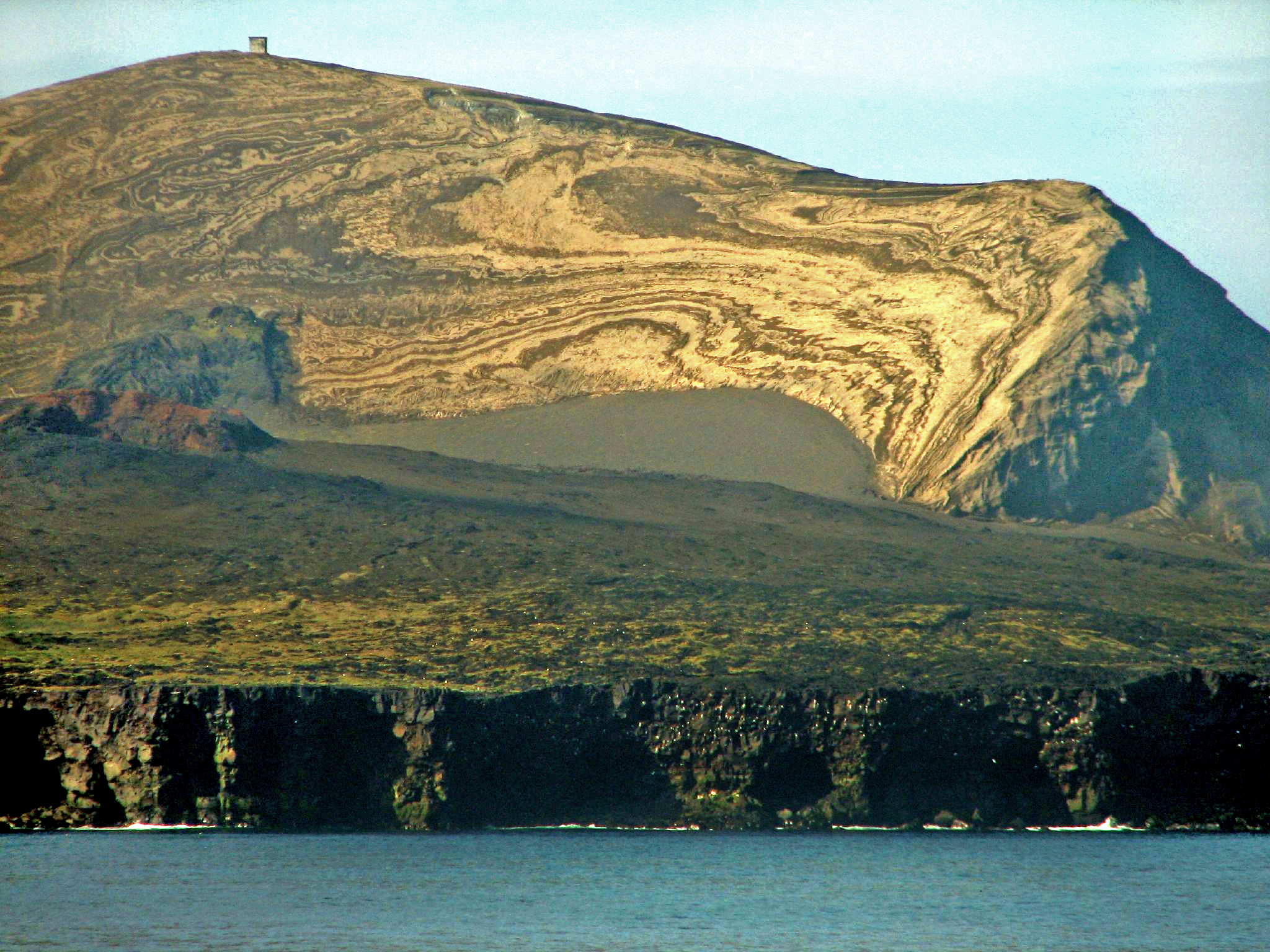
Surtsey in 2007.

The only significant human impact is a small prefabricated hut which is used by researchers while staying on the island. The hut includes a few bunk beds and a solar power source to drive an emergency radio and other key electronics. There is also an abandoned lighthouse foundation. In 2009, a weather observation station and a webcam were installed on Surtsey.

All visitors check themselves and belongings to ensure no seeds are accidentally introduced by humans to the island's developing ecosystem. It is believed that some boys who sneaked over from Heimaey by rowboat planted potatoes, which were promptly dug up once discovered. An improperly managed human defecation resulted in a tomato plant taking root, which was also destroyed.

== See also ==
- Geography of Iceland
- List of islands of Iceland
- List of new islands
- Volcanism of Iceland
  - List of volcanic eruptions in Iceland
  - List of volcanoes in Iceland
