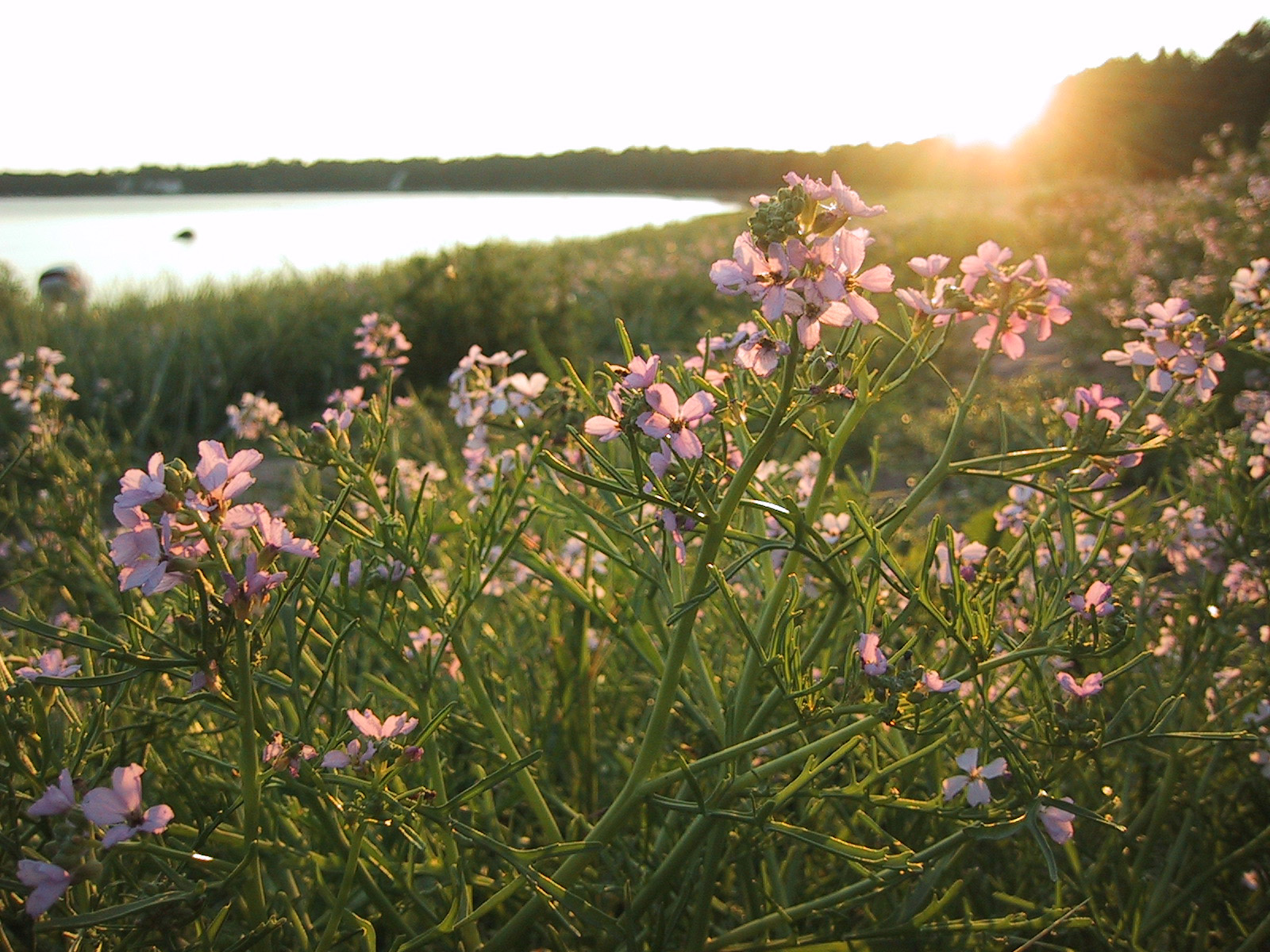
- Cakile maritima

Scientific classification
- Kingdom: Plantae
- Clade: Tracheophytes
- Clade: Angiosperms
- Clade: Eudicots
- Clade: Rosids
- Order: Brassicales
- Family: Brassicaceae
- Genus: Cakile; Mill.

= Cakile =

Genus of flowering plants

Cakile is a genus within the flowering plant family Brassicaceae. Species in this genus are commonly known as searockets, though this name on its own is applied particularly to whatever member of the species is native or most common in the region concerned, the European searocket Cakile maritima in Europe, and the American searocket C. edentula in North America. The genus is native to Europe, Asia and North America, but the European searocket has been introduced into North America and has spread widely on both east and west coasts; in many places it is replacing the native C. edentula, and is regarded as an undesirable invasive species.

Cakile species grow as annual plants with an erect or decumbent stem. The common species in Europe and North America grow close to the coast, often in dunes. Their leaves are fleshy. Flowers are typically pale mauve to white, with petals about 1 cm in length. Each fruit has two sections, one that remains attached to the adult, and the other which that falls off for dispersal by wind or water.

They are rather similar to those of the wild radish (also in family Brassicaceae) which is found in the same regions, and careful attention to the leaves and stems is needed to tell the two plants apart.

As of January 2019, Kew's Plants of the World Online accepts seven species:

- Cakile arabica Velen.
- Cakile arctica Pobed.
- Cakile constricta Rodman
- Cakile edentula (Bigelow) Hook.
- Cakile geniculata (B.L.Rob.) Millsp.
- Cakile lanceolata (Willd.) O.E.Schulz
- Cakile maritima Scop.
