= 2009 Tonga undersea volcanic eruption =

Volcanic eruption creating a new land linking Hunga Tonga and Hunga Haʻapai islands

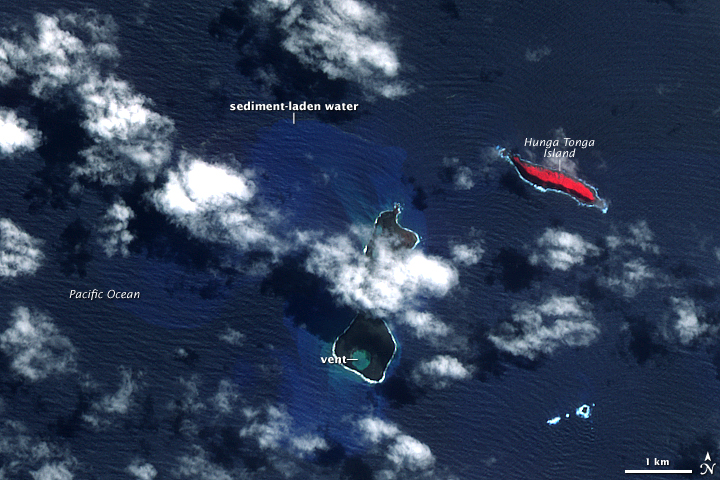
- False-color satellite image taken 25 March 2009, showing new land south of Hunga Haʻapai. Clouds cover the space between the new land and Hunga Haʻapai. The vent is the nearly perfect circular hole near the southern edge of the new land.
- Volcano: Hunga Tonga–Hunga Ha'apai
- Start date: 16 March 2009 (Note: The date the eruption began is uncertain. According to the Smithsonian Institution's Global Volcanism program, "Observers flying near the area of Hunga Tonga–Hunga Ha'apai (about 62 km NNW of Nuku'alofa, the capital of Tonga) on 16 or 17 March reported seeing an eruption." The report cites Keizo Gates' web log, dated 16 March 2009, which contains photos allegedly taken from civilian aircraft late on the afternoon of March 16. The Smithsonian subsequently confirmed that the eruption began on 16 March.)
- End date: 22 March 2009
- Type: Submarine, Surtseyan
- Location: Tonga; 20.57°S 175.38°W
- VEI: 2

The 2009 Tonga undersea volcanic eruption began on 16 March 2009, near the island of Hunga Tonga, approximately 62 kilometres (39 mi) from the Tongan capital of Nukuʻalofa. The volcano is in a highly active volcanic region that represents a portion of the Pacific Ring of Fire. It is estimated that there are up to 36 undersea volcanoes clustered together in the area.

== Eruption history ==
The initial 16–17 March eruption created an ejecta column (tephra) which sent ash and smoke up to 20 kilometres (12 mi) into the atmosphere and an initial inspection reported that the volcano had breached the ocean surface. Authorities suggested at that time that the eruption did not yet pose any threat to the capital's population, and an inspection team was sent out to evaluate the volcano.

Between 18 and 20 March, a number of Surtseyan eruptions sent ash plumes as high as 4 kilometres (2.5 mi) to 5.2 kilometres (3.2 mi) into the atmosphere, with prevailing winds pushing the ash cloud about 480 kilometres (300 mi) east-northeast of the eruption site and widespread and significant haze reported at Vavaʻu 255 kilometres (158 mi) away. Steam plumes on 20 March were measured at 1.8 kilometres (1.1 mi) above sea level. But on 21 March, an eruption sent steam and ash just 0.8 kilometres (0.50 mi) into the sky. On 21 March, Tonga's chief geologist Kelepi Mafi reported lava and ash from two vents, one on the uninhabited island Hunga Haʻapai and another about 100 m (330 ft) offshore, had filled the gap between the two vents, creating new land surface that measured hundreds of square metres. The eruption devastated Hunga Haʻapai, covering it in black ash and stripping it of vegetation and fauna.

== Disruptions ==
Two Air New Zealand airline flights into Tonga were delayed due to safety concerns caused by the volcanic ash, but flight schedules returned to normal shortly thereafter.

Tongan officials also expressed concern that the eruption could significantly harm the country's fishing industry.

== 2009 Tonga earthquake ==
Four days after the start of the eruption a strong earthquake measuring 7.6 M_{w}^{(ISC)} also struck the region. Ken Hudnut, a geophysicist for the United States Geological Survey, stated that "The association with the volcanic activity seems to be an interesting added dimension to this. It's not clear at this point that there is a direct association, but it seems suggestive at this point.". Keleti Mafi, the Tongan government's chief seismologist, also suggested that the earthquake was likely to have a direct impact on the volcanic eruption, stating that the "strength of the earthquake could crack the volcano's (undersea) vent and allow more magma to be ejected".

== See also ==
- 2022 Hunga Tonga–Hunga Haʻapai eruption and tsunami
- Tonga Trench – deepest trench in the Southern hemisphere where the Pacific plate is being subducted westward
