= Bogoslof Island =

Volcanic island in the U.S. state of Alaska

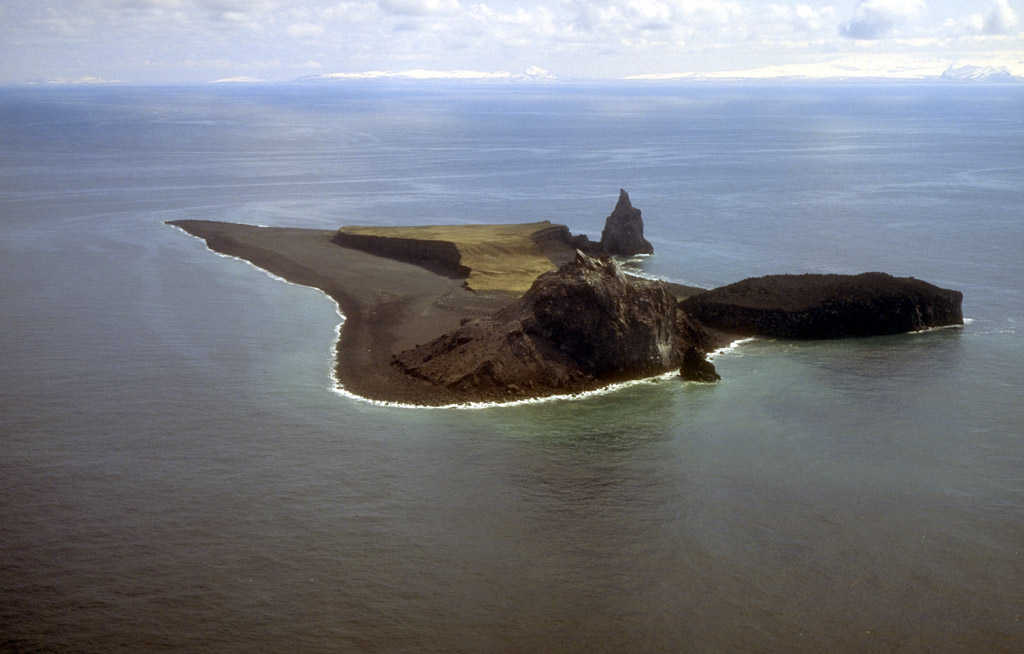
- Aerial view, looking south (1994)

Highest point
- Elevation: 492 ft (150 m)
- Coordinates: 53°55′38″N 168°02′04″W

Geography
- Location within Alaska
- Location: Aleutian Islands, Alaska

Geology
- Formed by: Subduction zone volcanism
- Mountain type: Submarine volcano
- Volcanic arc: Aleutian Arc
- Last eruption: December 20, 2016–August 30, 2017

U.S. National Natural Landmark
- Designated: 1967

Bogoslof Island or Agasagook Island (Aleut: Aĝasaaĝux̂) is the summit of a submarine stratovolcano at the south edge of the Bering Sea, 35 miles (56 km) northwest of Unalaska Island of the Aleutian Islands chain. It has a land area of 319.3 acres (1.292 km^{2}) and is uninhabited. It is 1,040 meters (3,410 ft) long and 1,512 m (4,961 ft) wide, with a peak elevation of 490 feet (150 m). The stratovolcano rises about 6,000 ft (1,800 m) from the seabed, but the summit is the only part that projects above sea level. The island is believed to be relatively new, with the volcano being entirely below sea level before 1796, and most of the presently 300-acre island being formed by eruptions since 1900.

== History ==
The first known emergence of the island above sea level was recorded during an underwater eruption in 1796. Since then, parts of the island have been successively added and eroded. About 2,000 feet (610 m) northwest of Bogoslof, a small volcanic dome emerged in 1883 from the same stratovolcano and has become a stack rock formation known as Fire Island. On the southwest side of Bogoslof, another dome erupted in 1796; it is now called Castle Rock. Other eruptions have occurred in 1796–1804, 1806–1823, 1883–1895, 1906, 1907, 1909–1910, 1926–1928, 1992, and 2016–2017. The island is a breeding site for seabirds, seals, and sea lions. An estimated 90,000 tufted puffins, guillemots, red-legged kittiwakes and gulls nest here.

In 1909, President Theodore Roosevelt designated Bogoslof Island and Fire Island a sanctuary for sea lions and nesting marine birds. Together, as the Bogoslof Wilderness, they are currently part of the Aleutian Islands unit of the Alaska Maritime National Wildlife Refuge. In November 1967, Bogoslof Island was designated a National Natural Landmark by the National Park Service. The Bogoslof Island group was added to the National Wilderness Preservation System in 1970.

Eruption year	Lava dome
1796–1804	Castle Rock
1806–1823	none?
1883–1895	Fire Island
1906–1910	none
1926–1928	unnamed
1992	unnamed
2016–2017	none

=== 2016–2017 Eruptions ===
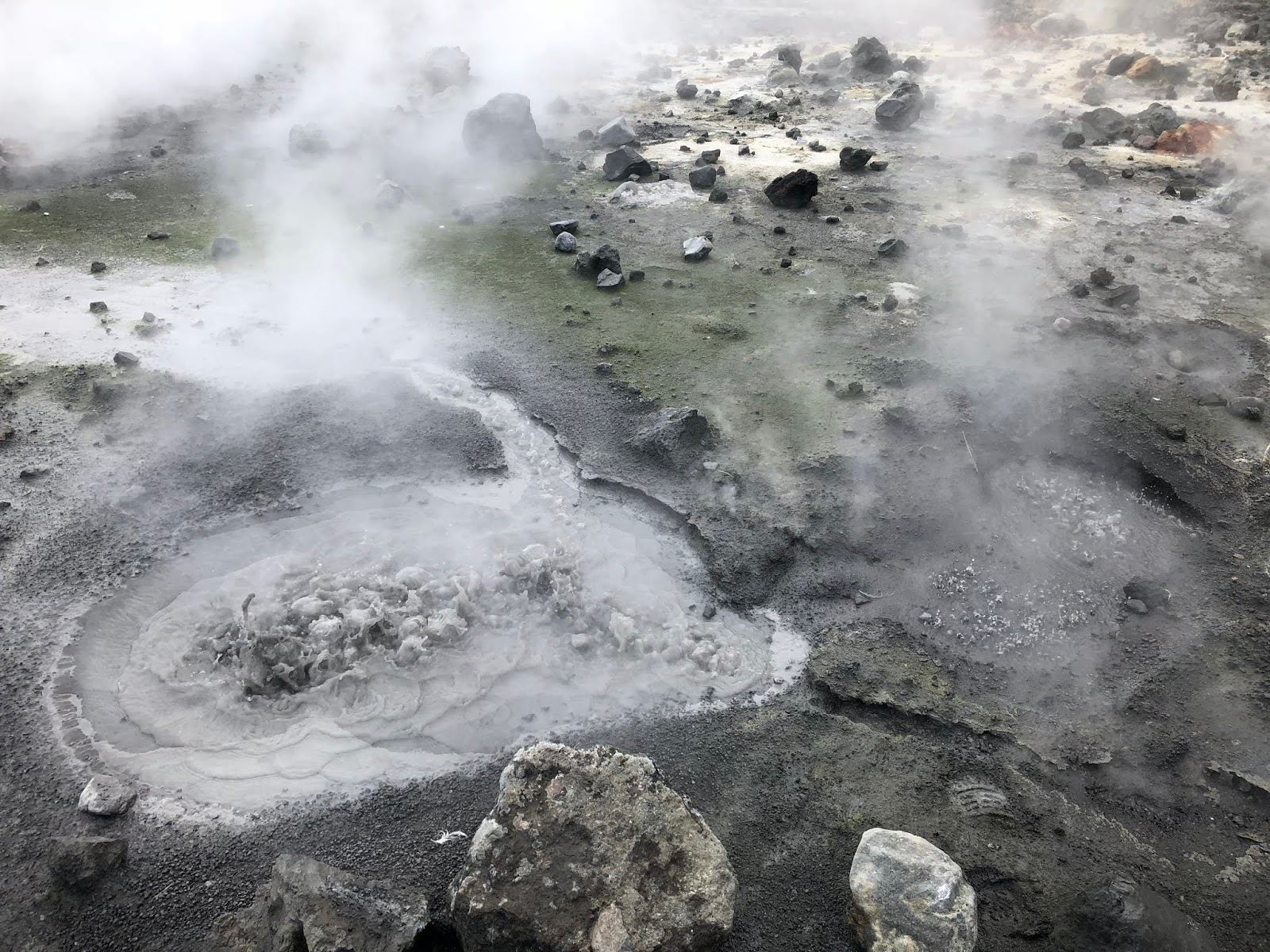
Boiling mud, August 2018

- 20 December 2016: A series of short nearly-daily volcanic eruptions started, producing towering volcanic ash clouds and volcanic lightning, changing the geography of the island. As there are no cameras or monitoring stations on the island and the area is usually overcast, details were uncertain. However, when the weather became favorable, it was seen that a small vent slightly offshore of Bogoslof's northeast beach had erupted explosively, fracturing the original island in two, and forming a new, smaller island to the northeast.
- 25 December 2016: Satellite images of the island showed that the island had fractured into three smaller islands centered on what was thought to be the active vent of the eruption, gaining a net 1.2 acres (0.0049 km^{2}), compared to its previous area of 71.2 acres (0.288 km^{2}). Bogoslof continued to grow in the following weeks, reaching a size of 108.0 acres (0.437 km^{2}) on January 11, 2017, and merging again into a single island.
- 02:08 UTC on 20 February (17:08 AKST on 19 February): A significant explosive eruption began at Bogoslof volcano. Seismic and infrasound data showed a series of short-lived explosive pulses through 02:45 UTC; seismicity decreased slightly since then. Recent satellite images show a cloud as high as 25,000 ft asl.
- 11 March 2017: Bogoslof was 242 acres (0.98 km^{2}) in size, having more than tripled in size, and forming into a large circular island around the central vent, and would likely continue to grow.
- 10 May 2017: Bogoslof was estimated to have an area of about 319 acres or 1.3 square kilometers.
- 17 May 2017: An eruption sent ash 34,000 feet into the atmosphere.
- 28 May 2017: Another eruption sent ash as high as 35,000 feet and raised Aviation Color Code to red, its highest level. Ash that rises above 20,000 feet is a threat to airliners in the area The National Weather Service Alaska Aviation Weather Unit also issued an alert that the ash cloud may climb as high as 50,000 feet.
- 30 August 2017: An eruption occurred, with slight volcanic activity continuing into early December, after which the volcano appeared to return to relative inactivity.

== Gallery ==
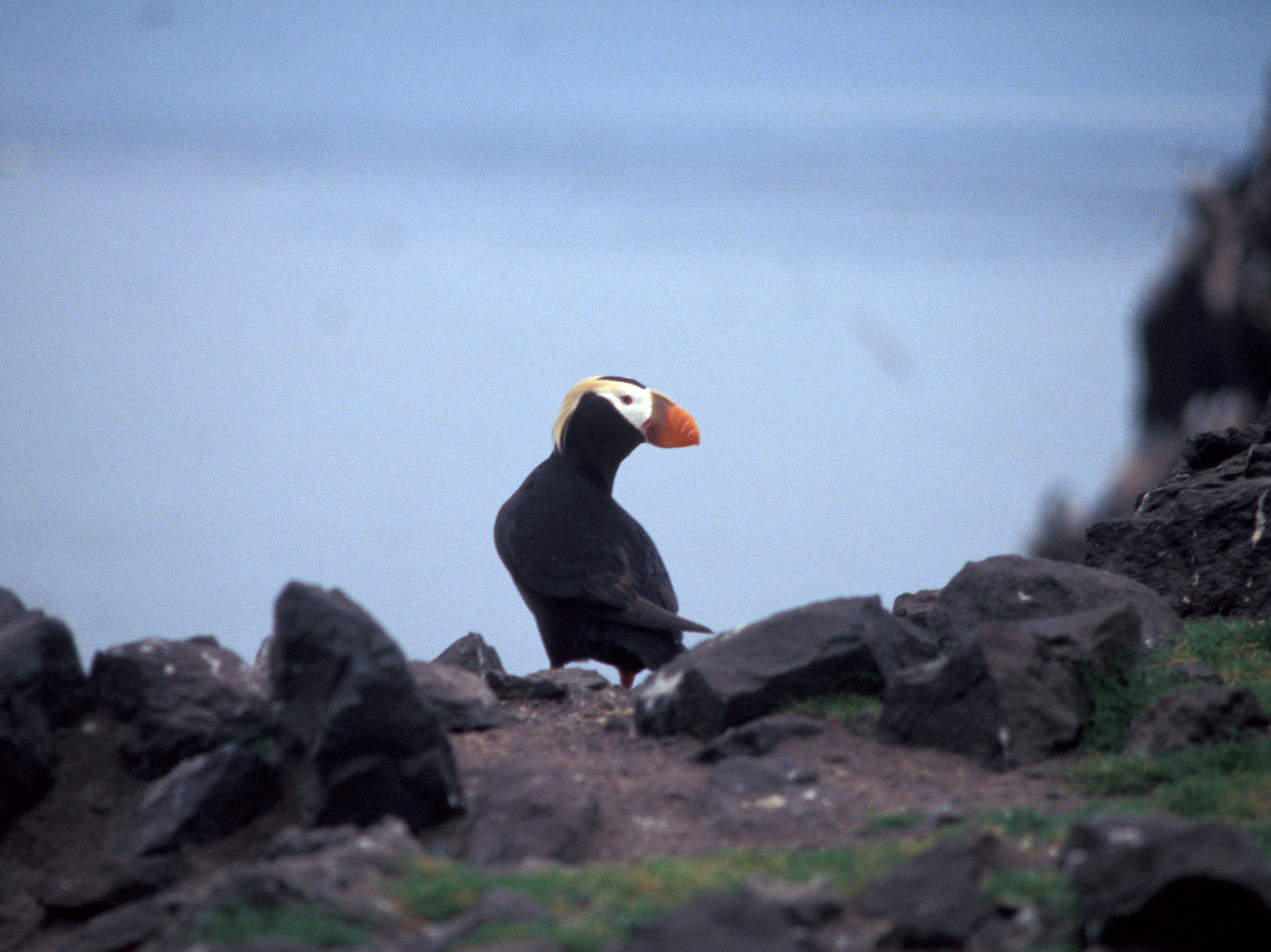
A tufted puffin on Bogoslof Island

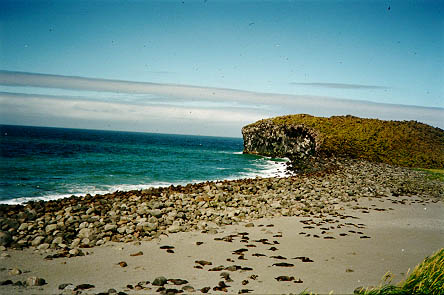
A fur seal colony on Bogoslof Island

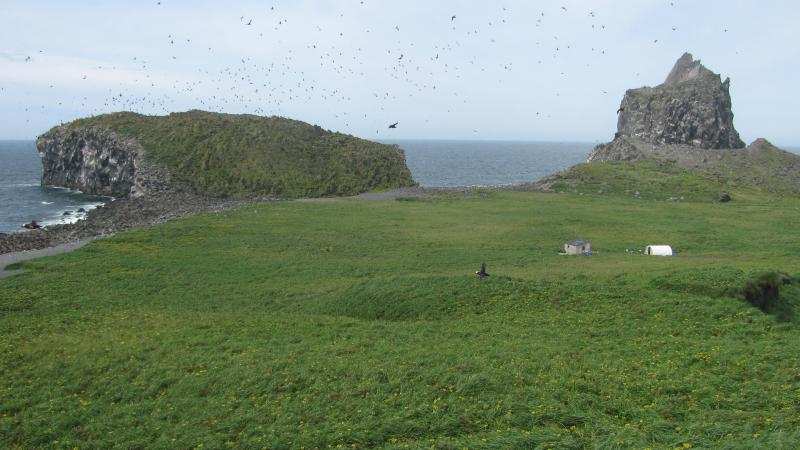
Surface of the island in August 2009, showing the 1926–1928 lava dome (left) and 1992 lava dome (right)

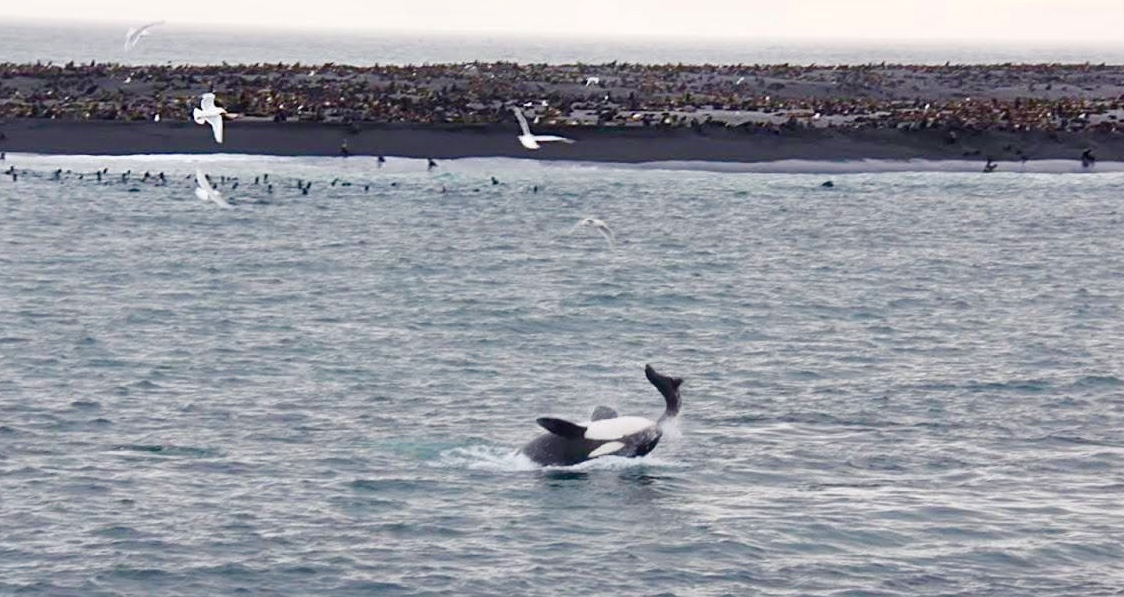
Orca feeding on a fur seal at Bogoslof Island

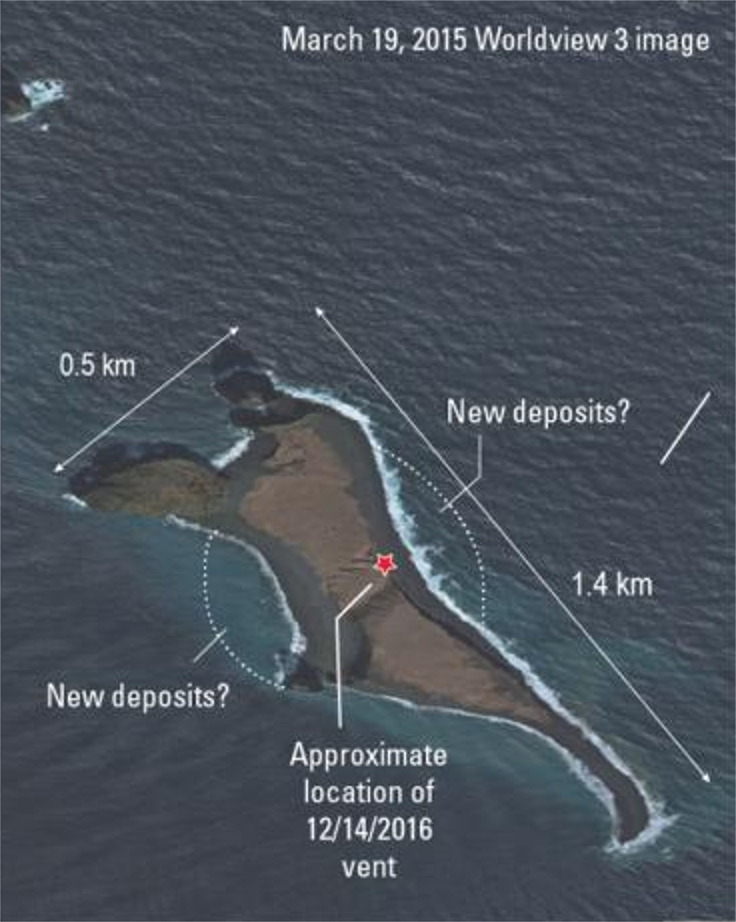
Satellite image of Bogoslof in 2015, before the 2016–2017 eruptions which significantly altered the island's appearance.

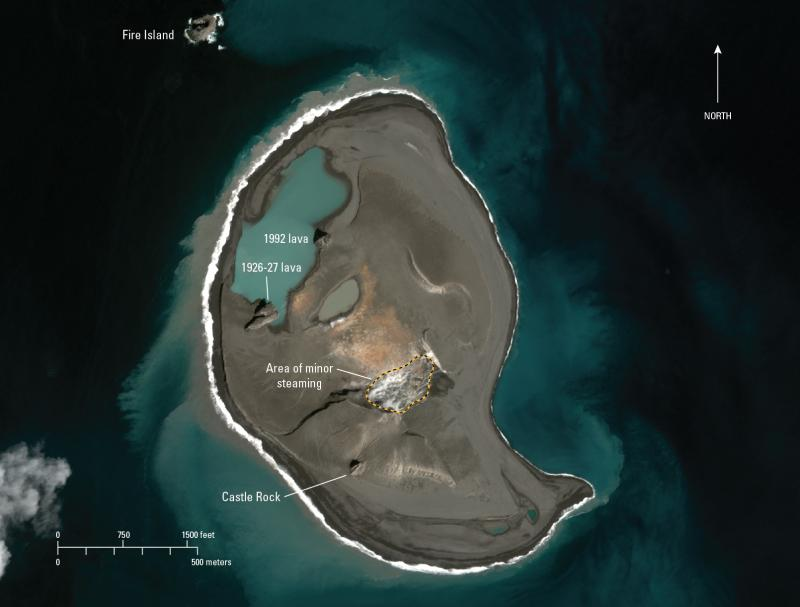
Bogoslof Island on April 20, 2018, showing the significant post-eruption terrain change.

== See also ==
- Bogoslof Wilderness
- List of National Natural Landmarks
- List of volcanoes in the United States of America
