= Fire Island (Aleutian Islands) =

Fire Island is located in the eastern Aleutian Islands at 53°56′36″N 168°02′45″W. It emerged in 1883, forming a companion island to Bogoslof Island. Originally, this Fire Island was named New Bogoslof (also Grewingk, after an Alaskan geologist). In 1909, President Theodore Roosevelt made Bogoslof and New Bogoslof a federally protected bird sanctuary. Both islands are currently part of the Bogoslof Wilderness in the Aleutian Islands unit of Alaska Maritime National Wildlife Refuge.
