= Jólnir =

Seamount in Iceland

Coordinates: 63.2947°N 20.6328°W

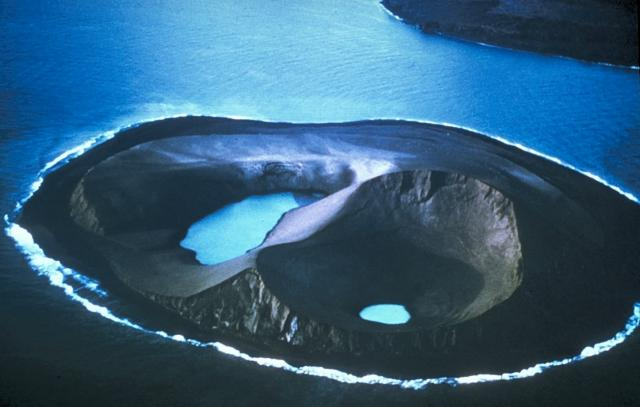
- Jólnir on 22 August 1966, two weeks after volcanic activity ceased

Highest point
- Elevation: 64 metres (210 ft) (as an island); Below sea level (present)
- Prominence: Below sea level

Geography
- Location: The Atlantic Ocean's sea floor southwest of Surtsey, Iceland

Geology
- Rock age: Recent
- Mountain type(s): Volcanic island, volcanic cone
- Last eruption: 1966

Jólnir (Icelandic pronunciation: [ˈjoulnɪr̥]) was formerly a volcanic island south of Iceland. It was a former vent of Surtsey, along with Syrtlingur and Surtla. It emerged from the ocean as a result of active plate tectonics between December 1965 and July 1966. Oceanic erosion cyclically wore down the new lava as it formed, and the island sank below the surface several times.

It was named for Jólnir, a Norse god (usually identified as a second name for Odin).

Jólnir's formation is closely linked to that of neighboring volcanic island, Surtsey, which emerged in 1963. Volcanic eruptions occurred in much of the surrounding water, but newly formed land was subject to erosion and many small islands washed away. By 1966, Jólnir had broken the surface and a volcanic cone of mafic tephra developed. The volcanic cone reached 64 metres (210 ft) above sea level, but even this landmass eventually gave way to the eroding ocean waves.

After volcanic activity ceased on 8 August 1966, the Atlantic Ocean's waves rapidly eroded the volcanic island. Near the end of September 1966, the island disappeared below the Atlantic Ocean's surface.

== See also ==
- Volcanism of Iceland
  - List of volcanic eruptions in Iceland
  - List of volcanoes in Iceland
