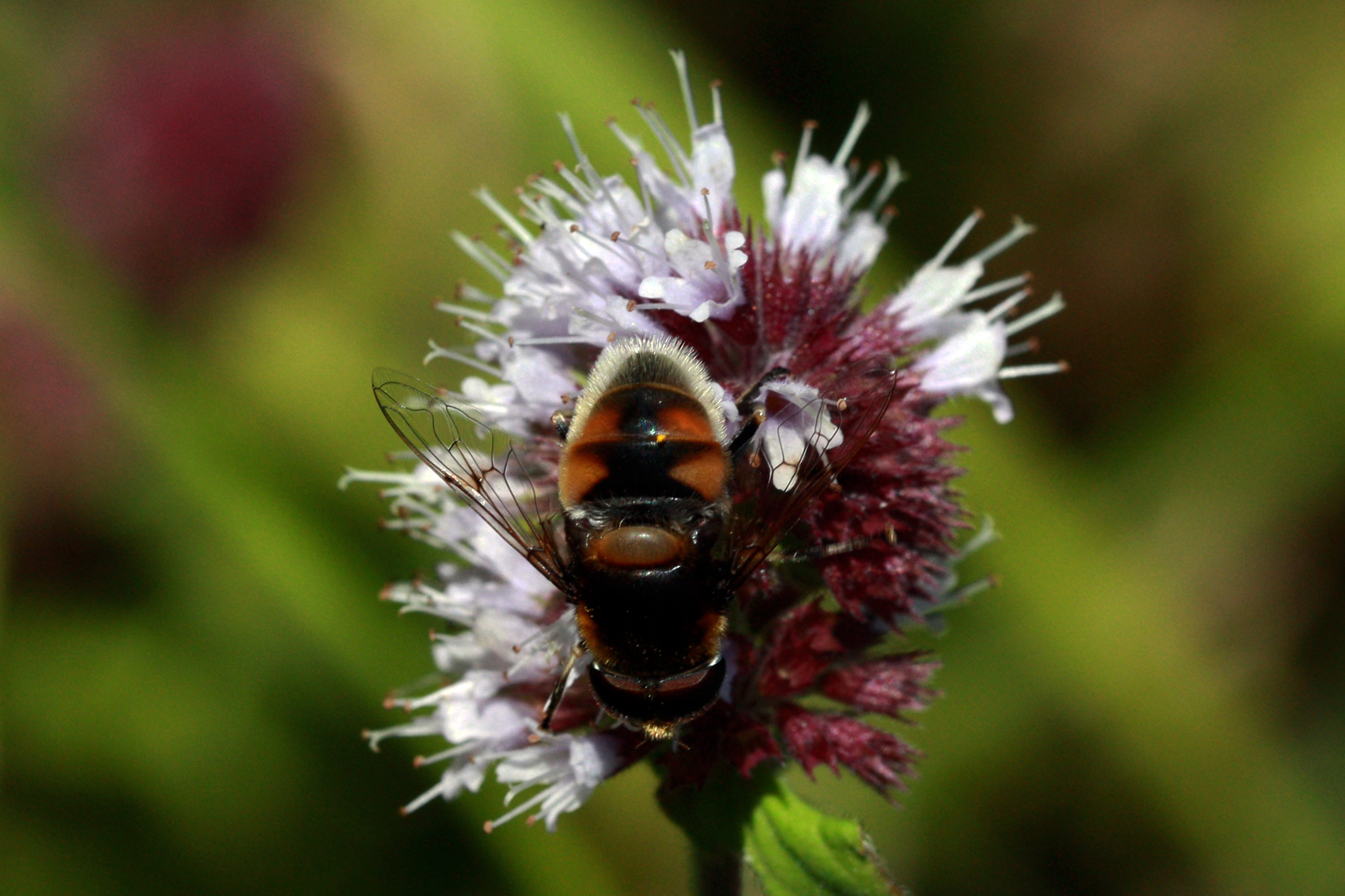
- male
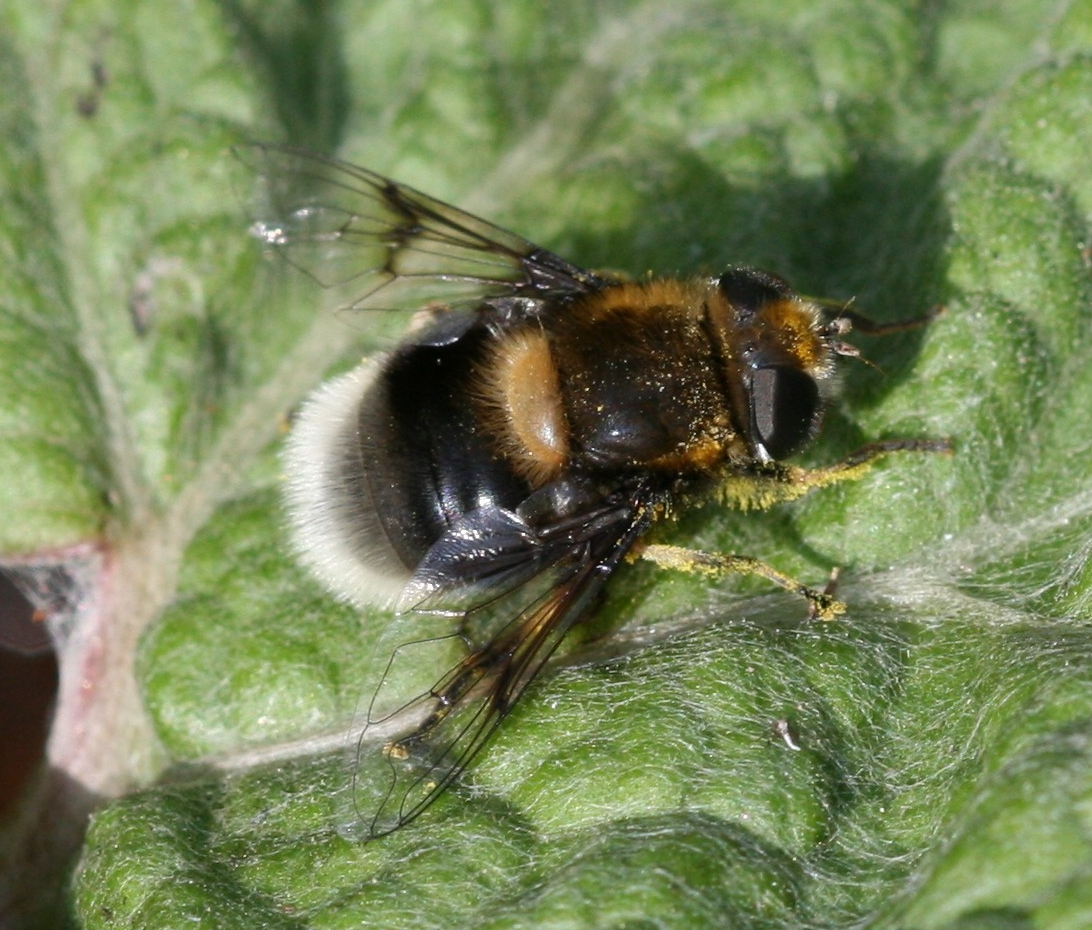
- female

Scientific classification
- Kingdom: Animalia
- Phylum: Arthropoda
- Clade: Pancrustacea
- Class: Insecta
- Order: Diptera
- Family: Syrphidae
- Genus: Eristalis
- Species: E. intricaria

Binomial name
- Eristalis intricaria (Linnaeus, 1758)

Synonyms
- Eristalis apiformis authors; Eristalis furvus Verrall, 1901; Eristalis fuscus (Harris, 1776); Musca fuscus Harris, 1776; Musca intricaria Linnaeus, 1758

= Eristalis intricaria =

Species of fly

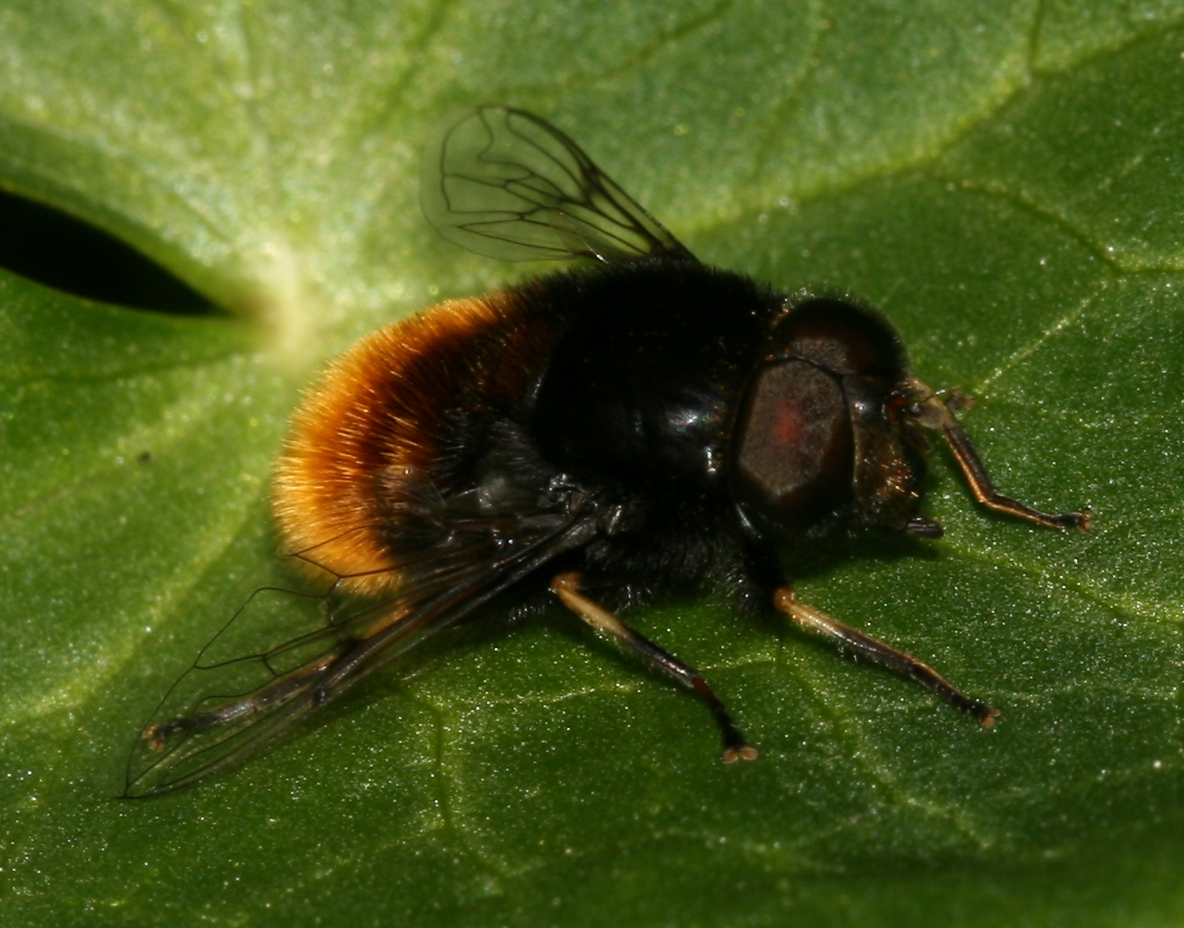
Eristalis intricaria male, red form

Eristalis intricaria, sometimes called the furry dronefly, is a European species of hoverfly. It is a furry bee mimic, superficially resembling Merodon, though Merodon have all black leg tibiae, as opposed to partly yellow. E. intricaria is somewhat variable in colour pattern, and some attempts at naming varieties have been tentatively made. Flight time of adults in the UK are from March to September. It is generally widespread, but is seldom seen in large numbers. Habitat is woodland or marshland.

== Description ==
External images For terms see Morphology of Diptera
Wing length 8·25–12 mm. Antennomere 3 brownish-black. Arista plumose on basal half. Squamulae greyish-black. Thorax and abdomen covered with long densely placed hairs, varying in colour from tawny (typical form) to black (var. furvus Verrall). Typical form dimorphic (male abdomen brownish-haired, female abdomen with blackish hairs, last tergite with white hairs). The male genitalia are figured by Hippa et al. (2001) The larva is figured by Hartley (1961)

== Distribution ==
Palaearctic Fennoscandia, Iceland and the Faroes South to central Spain, montane in the southern limit of its range and absent from most of South Europe. Ireland East through North Europe and Central Europe, Alps, into Russia as far as East Siberia.

== Biology ==
The habitat is wetland; raised bog, fen, fen carr, poorly-drained deciduous forest and humid, seasonally-flooded grassland, boreal forests, taiga, montane tundra. Flowers visited include white umbellifers yellow composites, Ranunculaceae, Armeria maritima, Cakile, Calluna vulgaris, Cirsium, Crataegus, Filipendula, Jasione, Ligustrum, Lythrum, Mentha, Polygonum cuspidatum, Prunus spinosa, Pyrus communis, Rhododendron, Rubus, Salix, Succisa. The flight period is mid April to end August. The larvae occur in mud and fen peat beside water, in field drains, slurry and in cow dung on water-logged ground.
