= Mediterranean Sea =

Sea between Africa, Asia, and Europe

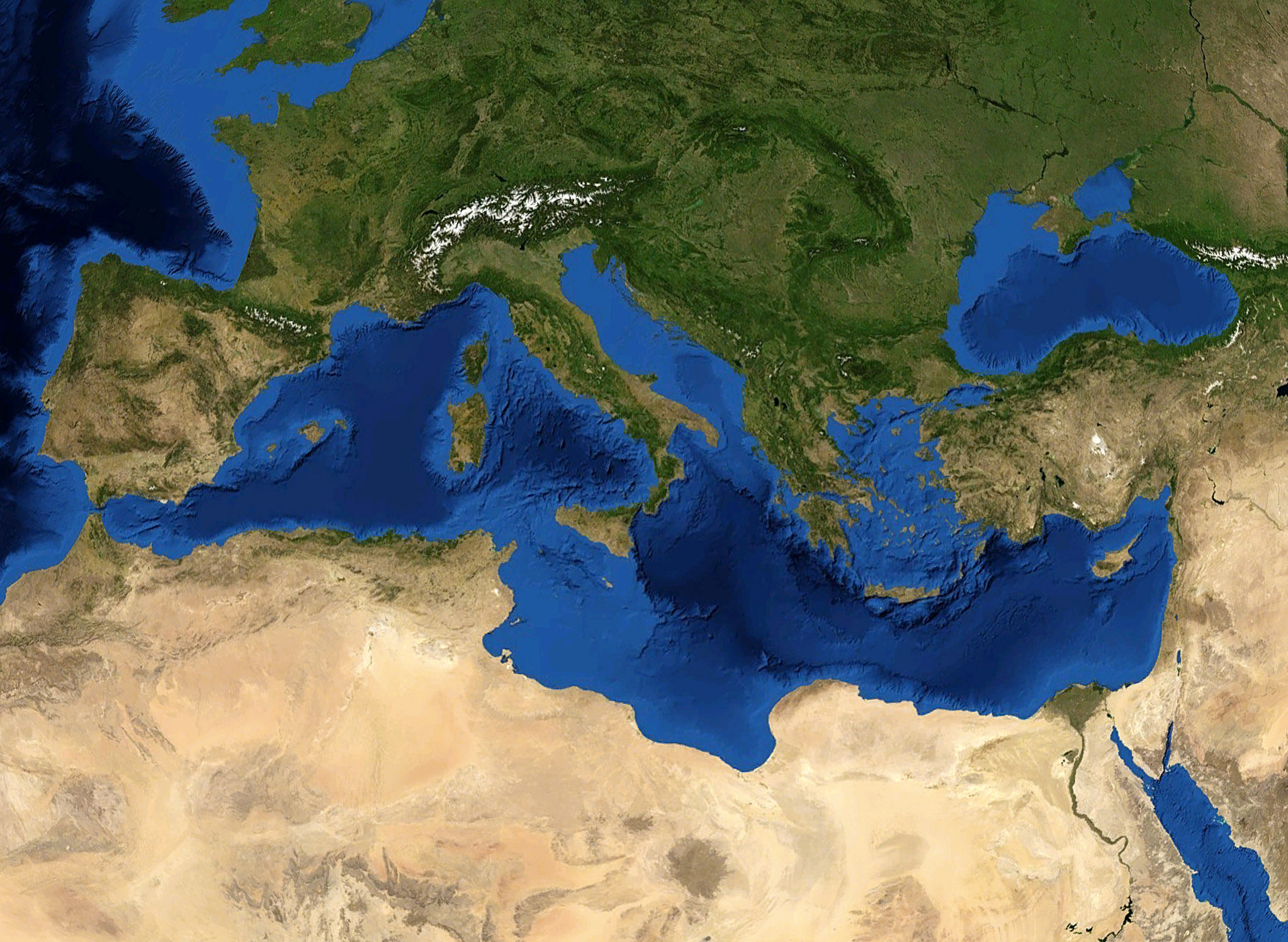
- The Mediterranean Sea
- Interactive map of Mediterranean Sea
- Location: North Africa; Southern Europe; West Asia
- Coordinates: 35°N 18°E
- Type: Sea
- Primary inflows: Gulf of Cádiz, Sea of Marmara, Nile, Ebro, Rhône, Chelif, Po
- Primary outflows: Strait of Gibraltar, Dardanelles
- Basin countries: Coastal countries: Albania; Algeria; Bosnia and Herzegovina; Croatia; Cyprus; Egypt; France; Greece; Israel; Italy; Lebanon; Libya; Malta; Monaco; Montenegro; Morocco; Northern Cyprus (Note: recognised only by Turkey, see: Cyprus problem); Palestine (Gaza Strip); Slovenia; Spain; Syria; Tunisia; Turkey; United Kingdom (Note: via Akrotiri and Dhekelia and Gibraltar); For other countries, click here.
- Surface area: 2,500,000 km^{2} (970,000 sq mi)
- Average depth: 1,500 m (4,900 ft)
- Max. depth: 5,109 m (16,762 ft) ±1 m (3 ft)
- Water volume: 3,750,000 km^{3} (900,000 cu mi)
- Residence time: 80–100 years
- Max. temperature: 28 °C (82 °F)
- Min. temperature: 12 °C (54 °F)
- Islands: 3300+
- Settlements: Full list

The Mediterranean Sea (/ˌmɛdɪtəˈreɪniən/ MED-ih-tə-RAY-nee-ən) is an intercontinental sea situated between Europe, Asia, and Africa. It is surrounded by the Mediterranean basin and almost completely enclosed by land: on the east by the Levant in West Asia, on the north by Anatolia in West Asia and Southern Europe, and on the south by North Africa. To its west it is connected to the Atlantic Ocean via the Strait of Gibraltar that separates the Iberian Peninsula in Europe from Morocco in Africa by only 14 km (9 mi); additionally, it is connected to the Black Sea through the Bosporus strait that intersects Turkey in the northeast and the Red Sea via the Suez Canal in the southeast.

The Mediterranean Sea covers an area of about 2,500,000 km^{2} (970,000 sq mi), representing 0.7% of the global ocean surface; it includes fifteen marginal seas, including the Aegean, Adriatic, Tyrrhenian, and Marmara. Geological evidence indicates that around 5.9 million years ago, the Mediterranean was cut off from the Atlantic and was partly or completely desiccated over a period of some 600,000 years during the Messinian salinity crisis before being refilled by the Zanclean flood about 5.3 million years ago.

The history of the Mediterranean region is crucial to understanding the origins and development of many modern societies; it is sometimes described as an "incubator of Western civilization" and saw the emergence of some of the earliest and most advanced civilisations, including those of Egypt, Greece, and the Fertile Crescent. The Levant in the Eastern Mediterranean was among the first regions in the world to display permanent human habitation as early as 12,000 BC. The Mediterranean Sea was an important route for merchants, travellers, and migrants in antiquity, facilitating trade and cultural exchange between various peoples as well as colonisation and conquest. The Roman Empire maintained nautical hegemony over the sea for centuries and is the only state to have ever controlled all of its coasts.

The Mediterranean Sea has an average depth of 1,500 m (4,900 ft) and the deepest recorded point is 5,109 ± 1 m (16,762 ± 3 ft) in the Calypso Deep in the Ionian Sea. It lies between latitudes 30° and 46° N and longitudes 6° W and 36° E. Its west–east length, from the Strait of Gibraltar to the Gulf of Alexandretta, on the southeastern coast of Turkey, is about 4,000 kilometres (2,500 mi). The north–south length varies greatly between different shorelines and whether only straight routes are considered. Also including longitudinal changes, the shortest shipping route between the multinational Gulf of Trieste and the Libyan coastline of the Gulf of Sidra is about 1,900 kilometres (1,200 mi). The water temperatures are mild in winter and warm in summer and give name to the Mediterranean climate type due to the majority of precipitation falling in the cooler months. Its southern and eastern coastlines are lined with hot deserts not far inland, but the immediate coastline on all sides of the Mediterranean tends to have strong maritime moderation.

The countries surrounding the Mediterranean and its marginal seas in clockwise order are Spain, France, Monaco, Italy, Slovenia, Croatia, Bosnia and Herzegovina, Montenegro, Albania, Greece, Turkey, Syria, Lebanon, Israel, Palestine (Gaza Strip), Egypt, Libya, Tunisia, Algeria, and Morocco; Cyprus and Malta are island countries in the sea. In addition, Northern Cyprus (de facto state) and two overseas territories of the United Kingdom (Akrotiri and Dhekelia, and Gibraltar) also have coastlines along the Mediterranean Sea. The drainage basin encompasses a large number of other countries, the Nile being the longest river ending in the Mediterranean Sea. The Mediterranean Sea encompasses a vast number of islands, some of them of volcanic origin. The two largest islands, in both area and population, are Sicily and Sardinia.

== Names and etymology ==
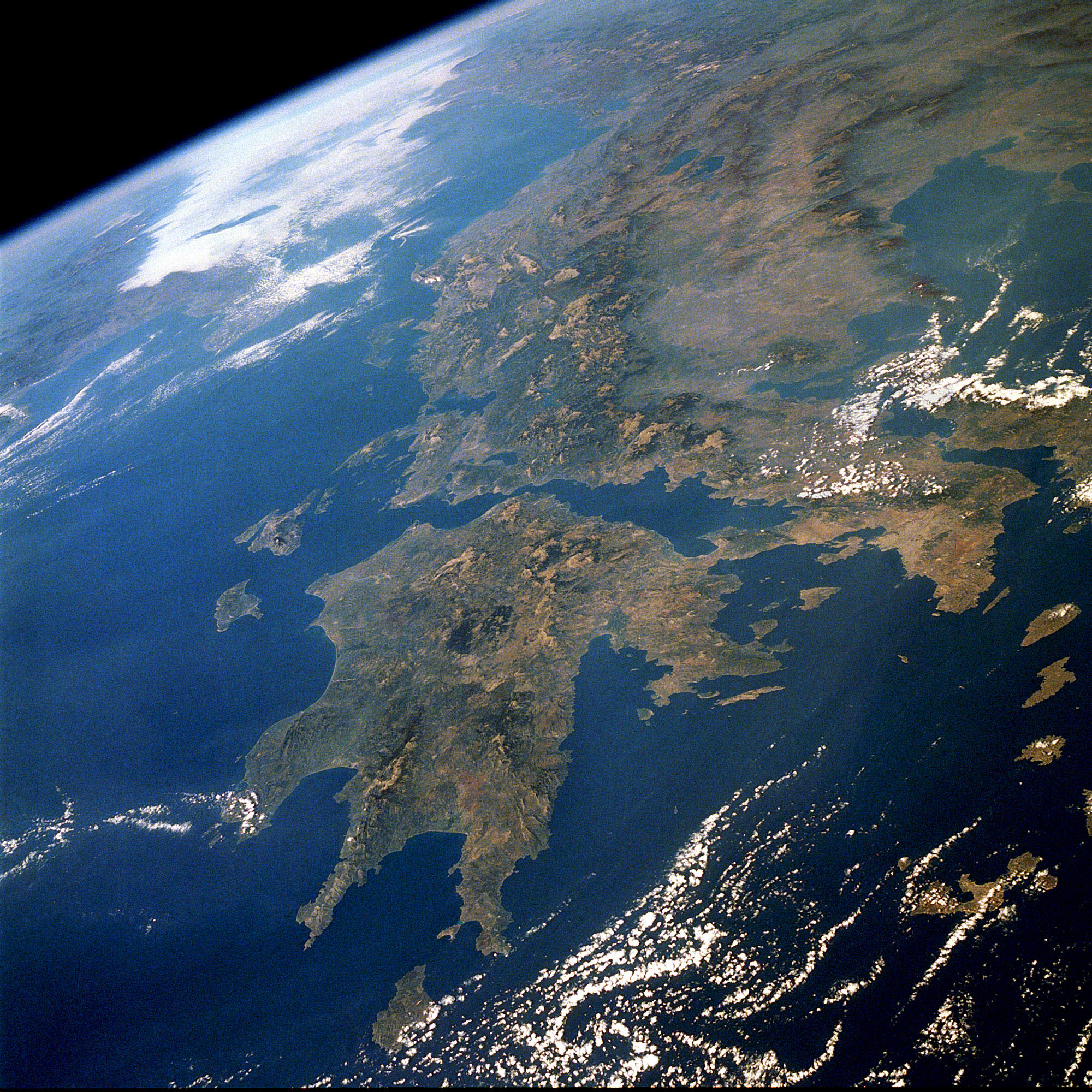
With its highly indented coastline and large number of islands, Greece has the longest Mediterranean coastline.

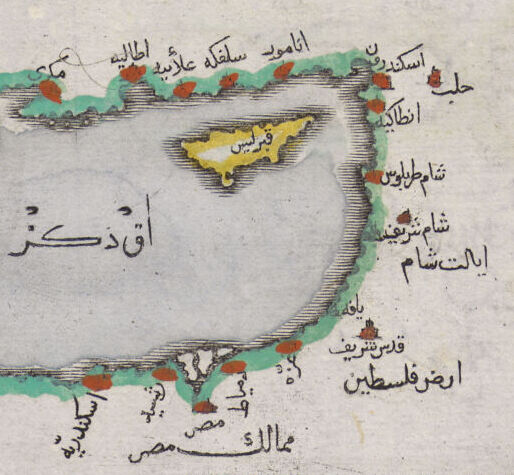
Eastern Mediterranean in Katip Çelebi's map (ﺁق دكز)

M14 wr mw
Wadj-Wer, or Wadj-Ur, ancient Egyptian name of the Mediterranean Sea
in hieroglyphs

- Romans called the Mediterranean Mare Magnum ("Great Sea") or Mare Internum ("Internal Sea") and, starting with the Roman Empire, Mare Nostrum ("Our Sea"). The term Mare Mediterrāneum appears later: Solinus apparently used this in the 3rd century, but the earliest extant witness to it is in the 6th century, in the work of Isidore of Seville. It means 'in the middle of land, inland' in Latin, a compound of medius ('middle'), terra ('land, earth'), and -āneus ('having the nature of'). The Latin word is a calque of Greek μεσόγειος (mesógeios; 'inland'), from μέσος (mésos, 'in the middle') and γήινος (gḗinos, 'of the earth'), from γῆ (gê, 'land, earth'). The original meaning may have been 'the sea in the middle of the earth', rather than 'the sea enclosed by land'.
- In Modern Arabic, it is known as al-Baḥr [al-Abyaḍ] al-Mutawassiṭ (البحر [الأبيض] المتوسط) 'the [White] Middle Sea'. In Islamic and older Arabic literature, it was Baḥr al-Rūm(ī) (بحر الروم or بحر الرومي) 'the Sea of the Romans' or 'the Roman Sea'. At first, that name referred to only the Eastern Mediterranean, but it was later extended to the whole Mediterranean. Other Arabic names were Baḥr al-šām(ī) (بحر الشام) ("the Sea of Syria") and Baḥr al-Maghrib (بحر المغرب) ("the Sea of the West").
- The Ancient Egyptians called the Mediterranean Wadj-wr/Wadj-Wer/Wadj-Ur. This term (lit. 'great green') was the name given by the Ancient Egyptians to the semi-solid, semi-aquatic region characterised by papyrus forests to the north of the cultivated Nile Delta, and, by extension, the sea beyond.
- The Carthaginians called it the "Syrian Sea". In ancient Syriac texts, Phoenician epics and in the Hebrew Bible, it was primarily known as the "Great Sea", הים הגדול, HaYam HaGadol, (Numbers; Book of Joshua; Ezekiel) or simply as "The Sea" (1 Kings). However, it has also been called the "Hinder Sea" because of its location on the west coast of the region of Syria or the Holy Land (and therefore behind a person facing the east), which is sometimes translated as "Western Sea". Another name was the "Sea of the Philistines", (Book of Exodus). In Modern Hebrew, it is called הים התיכון HaYam HaTikhon, 'the Middle Sea'.
- The Ancient Greeks called the Mediterranean simply ἡ θάλασσα ('the Sea') or sometimes ἡ μεγάλη θάλασσα ('the Great Sea'), ἡ ἡμετέρα θάλασσα ('Our Sea'), or ἡ θάλασσα ἡ καθ'ἡμᾶς ('the sea around us'). According to Johann Knobloch, in classical antiquity, cultures in the Levant used colours to refer to the cardinal points: black referred to the north (explaining the name Black Sea), yellow or blue to east, red to south (e.g., the Red Sea), and white to west. This would explain the Greek Áspri Thálassa, the Bulgarian Byalo More, the Turkish Akdeniz, and the Arab nomenclature described above, lit. "White Sea".
- The Old English name for the Mediterranean was the Wendel-sæ, or "Vandal Sea", after the Vandals who had occupied the shores of North Africa in the Migration Period.
- One name for the Mediterranean in Old (West) Norse appears to have been Jórsalahaf, the "Sea of Jerusalem". The "Hreiðsea", Hreiðmarar, mentioned on the Rök runestone might also refer to the Mediterranean.
- Ancient Iranians called it the "Roman Sea", in Classic Persian texts was called Daryāy-e Rōm (دریای روم) which may be from Middle Persian form, Zrēh ī Hrōm (𐭦𐭫𐭩𐭤 𐭩 𐭤𐭫𐭥𐭬). In Classic Persian texts it was called Daryāy-e Šām دریای شام) "The Western Sea" or "Syrian Sea".
- In Turkish, it is the Akdeniz 'the White Sea'; in Ottoman, ﺁق دكز, which sometimes means only the Aegean Sea. The name is thought to be coming from the colors associated with the cardinal directions in Turkic tradition, where "Ak" (white) stands for the west. It may be to contrast with the Black Sea. In Persian, the name was translated as Baḥr-i Safīd, which was also used in later Ottoman Turkish. It is probably the origin of the colloquial Greek phrase Άσπρη Θάλασσα, Áspri Thálassa, 'White Sea'.

== History ==
=== Ancient civilizations ===
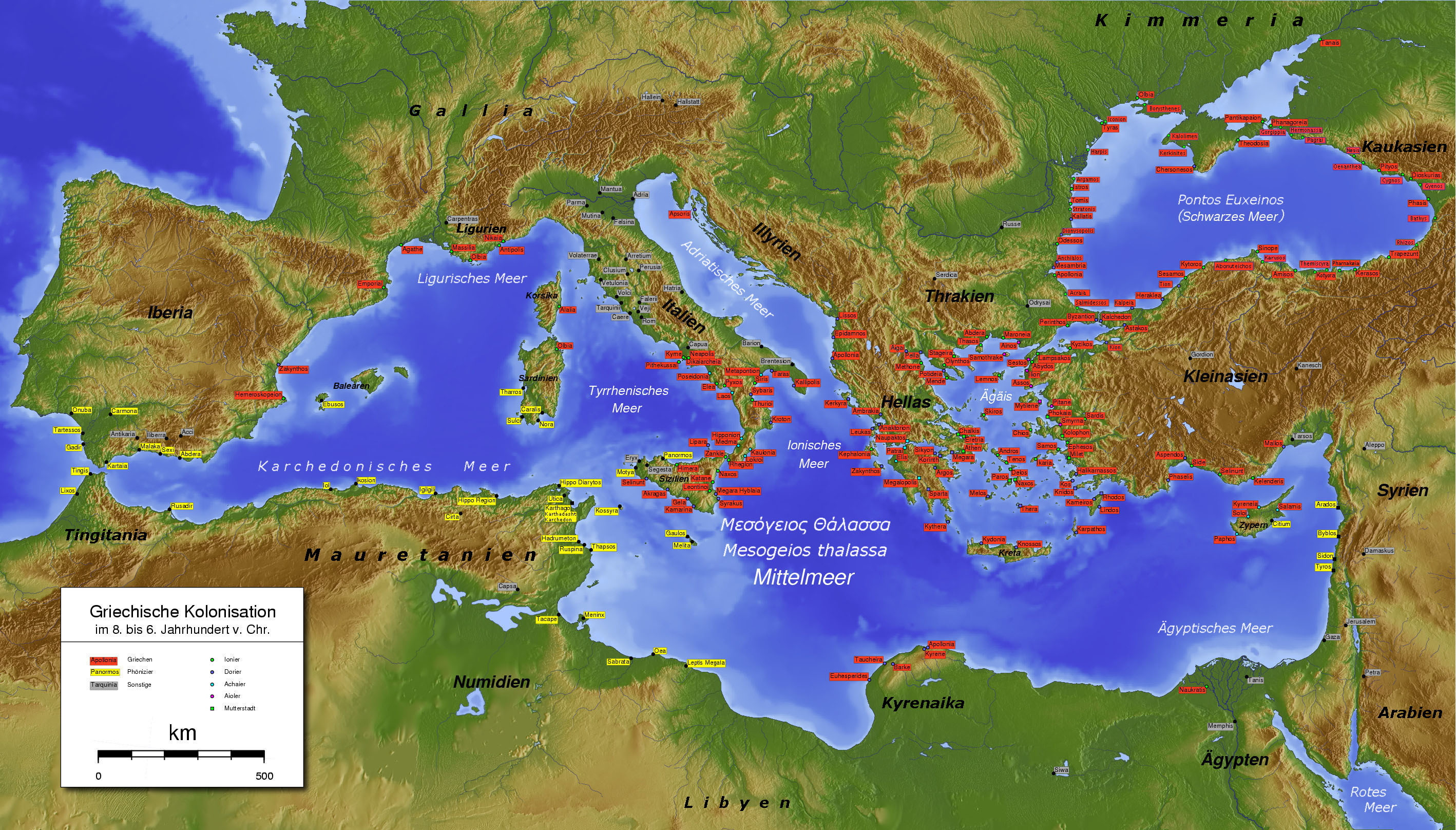
Greek (red) and Phoenician (yellow) colonies in antiquity c. the 6th century BC

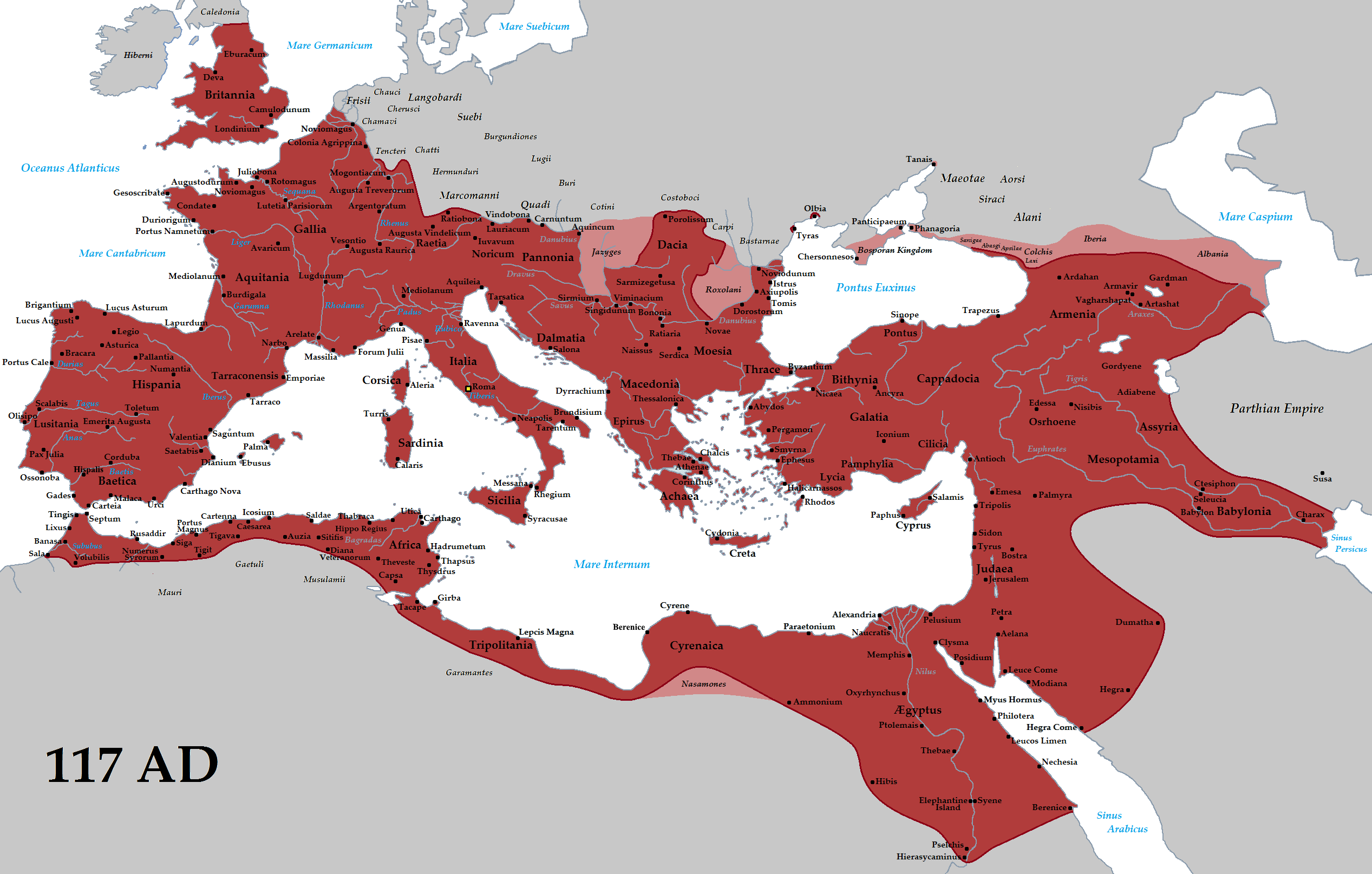
The Roman Empire in 117 AD, the end of the reign of Trajan

Major ancient civilizations were located around the Mediterranean. The sea provided routes for trade, colonization, and war, as well as food (from fishing and the gathering of other seafood) for numerous communities throughout the ages. The earliest advanced civilizations in the Mediterranean were the Egyptians and the Minoans, who traded extensively with each other. Around 1200 BC the eastern Mediterranean was greatly affected by the Bronze Age Collapse, which resulted in the destruction of many cities and trade routes.

Two other notable Mediterranean civilizations in classical antiquity are the Greek city-states and Phoenicians, both of whom extensively colonised the coastlines of the Mediterranean.

Darius I of Persia, who conquered Ancient Egypt, built a canal linking the Red Sea to the Nile, and thus the Mediterranean. Darius's canal was wide enough for two triremes to pass each other with oars extended and required four days to traverse.

Following the Punic Wars in the 3rd and 2nd centuries BC, the Roman Republic defeated the Carthaginians to become the preeminent power in the Western Mediterranean region. When Augustus founded the Roman Empire, the Romans referred to the Mediterranean as Mare Nostrum ("Our Sea"). For the next 400 years, the Roman Empire completely controlled the Mediterranean Sea and virtually all its coastal regions from Gibraltar to the Levant, giving the sea the nickname "Roman Lake".

=== Middle Ages and empires ===
The Western Roman Empire collapsed around 476 AD. The east was again dominant as Roman power still existed on in the Byzantine Empire formed in the 4th century from the eastern half of the Roman Empire. During that time, another power arose in the 7th century, and with it the religion of Islam, which soon swept across from the east; at its greatest extent, the Arabs, under the Umayyads, controlled the Iberian Peninsula, making a new phase of art and culture in the region.

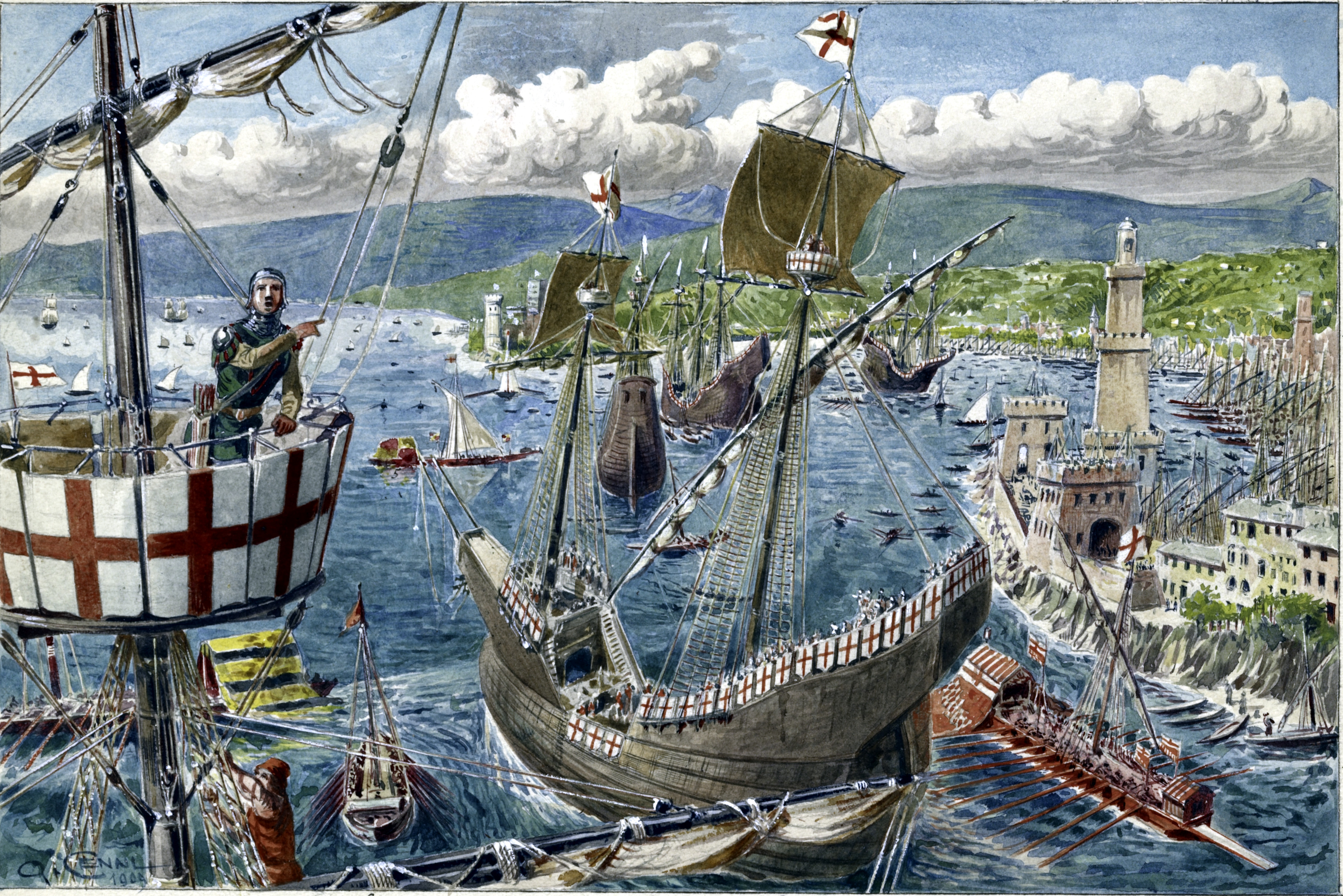
The port and fleet of Genoa in the early 14th century, by Quinto Cenni

A variety of foodstuffs, spices and crops were introduced to the western Mediterranean's Spain and Sicily during Arab rule, via the commercial networks of the Islamic world. These include sugarcane, rice, cotton, alfalfa, oranges, lemons, apricots, spinach, eggplants, carrots, saffron and bananas. The Arabs also continued extensive cultivation and production of olive oil (the Spanish words for 'oil' and 'olive'—aceite and aceituna, respectively—are derived from the Arabic al-zait, meaning 'olive juice'), and pomegranates (the heraldic symbol of Granada) from classical Greco-Roman times.

The Arab invasions disrupted the trade relations between Western and Eastern Europe while disrupting trade routes with Eastern Asian Empires. This, however, had the indirect effect of promoting trade across the Caspian Sea. The export of grains from Egypt was re-routed towards the Eastern world. Products from East Asian empires, like silk and spices, were carried from Egypt to ports like Venice and Constantinople by sailors and Jewish merchants. The Viking raids further disrupted the trade in western Europe and brought it to a halt. However, the Norsemen developed the trade from Norway to the White Sea, while also trading in luxury goods from Spain and the Mediterranean. The Byzantines in the mid-8th century retook control of the area around the north-eastern part of the Mediterranean. Venetian ships from the 9th century armed themselves to counter the harassment by Arabs while concentrating trade of Asian goods in Venice.

The Battle of Lepanto, 1571, ended in victory for the European Holy League against the Ottoman Turks.

The Fatimids maintained trade relations with the Italian city-states like Amalfi and Genoa before the Crusades, according to the Cairo Geniza documents. A document dated 996 mentions Amalfian merchants living in Cairo. Another letter states that the Genoese had traded with Alexandria. The caliph al-Mustansir had allowed Amalfian merchants to reside in Jerusalem about 1060 in place of the Latin hospice.

The Crusades led to the flourishing of trade between Europe and the outremer region. Genoa, Venice and Pisa created colonies in regions controlled by the Crusaders and came to control the trade with the Orient. These colonies also allowed them to trade with the Eastern world. Though the fall of the Crusader states and attempts at banning of trade relations with Muslim states by the Popes temporarily disrupted the trade with the Orient, it however continued. Europe started to revive, however, when there was gradual centralization of state power in the Renaissance of the 12th century.

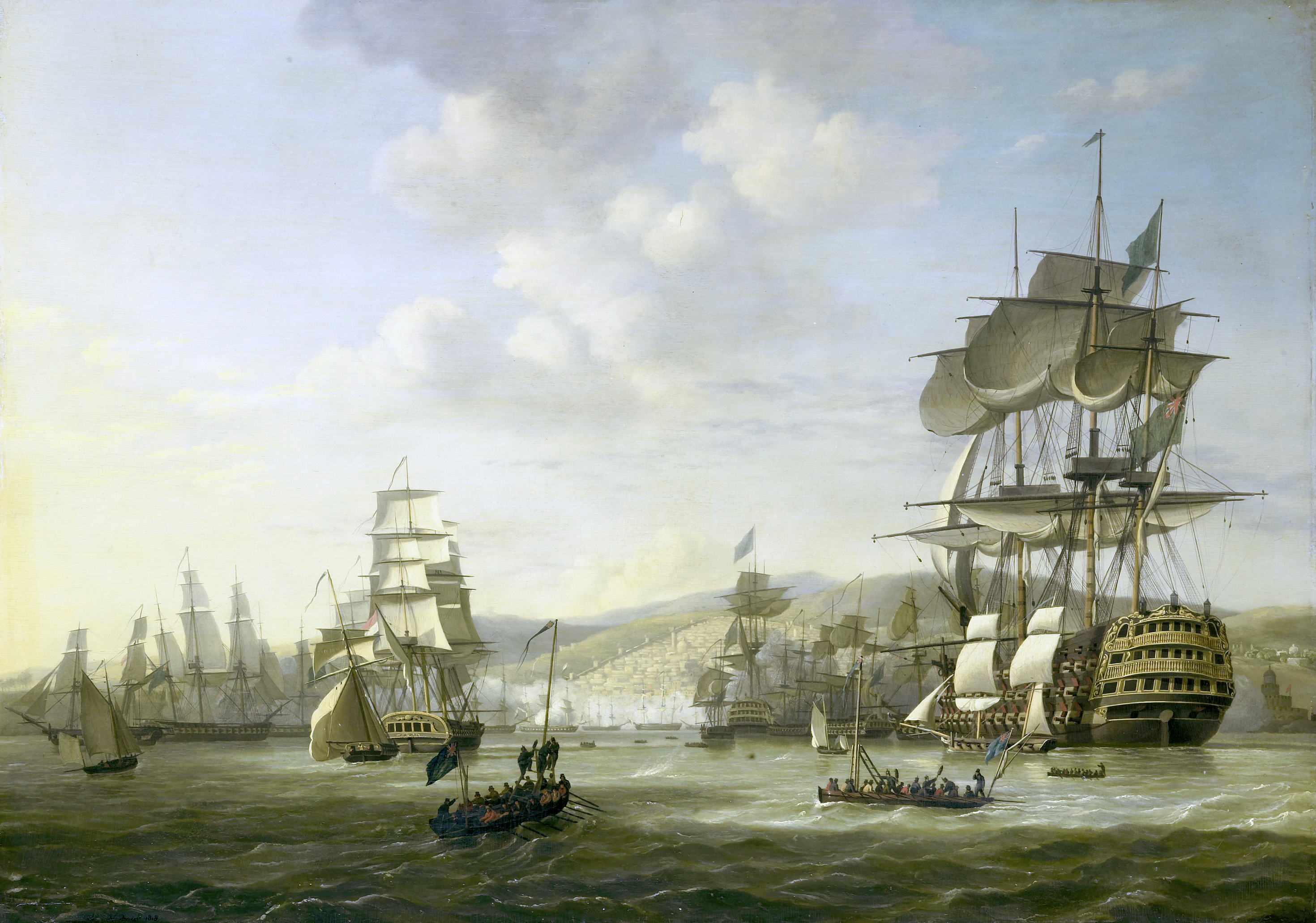
The bombardment of Algiers by the Anglo-Dutch fleet in support of an ultimatum to release European slaves, August 1816

Ottoman power based in Anatolia continued to grow, and in 1453 extinguished the Byzantine Empire with the Conquest of Constantinople. Hayreddin Barbarossa, the Ottoman captain is a symbol of this domination with the victory of the Battle of Preveza (1538), opening up Tripoli and the eastern Mediterranean to Ottoman rule. As the naval prowess of the European powers increased, they confronted Ottoman expansion in the region when the Battle of Lepanto (1571) damaging the power of the Ottoman Navy. This was the last naval battle to be fought primarily between galleys.

The Barbary pirates of Northwest Africa preyed on Christian shipping and coastlines in the Western Mediterranean Sea. According to Robert Davis, from the 16th to 19th centuries, pirates captured 1 million to 1.25 million Europeans as slaves.

The development of oceanic shipping began to affect the entire Mediterranean. Once, most of the trade between Western Europe and the East was passing through the region, but after the 1490s the development of a sea route to the Indian Ocean allowed the importation of Asian spices and other goods through the Atlantic ports of western Europe.

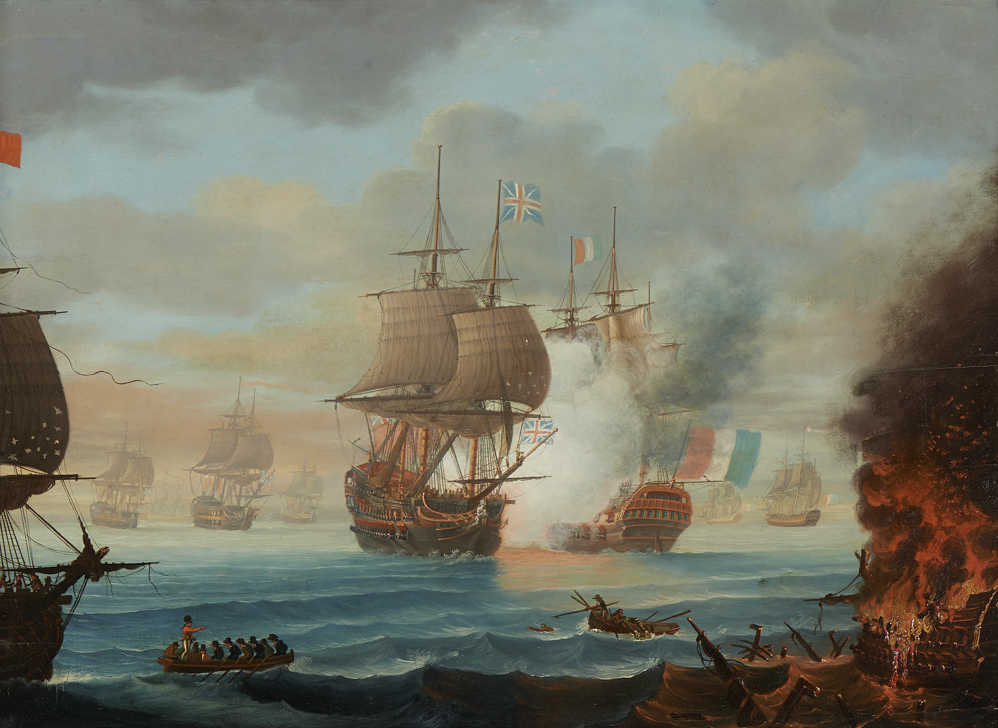
Battle of the Nile during the French campaign in Egypt, August 1798

The sea remained strategically important. British mastery of Gibraltar ensured their influence in Africa and Southwest Asia. Especially after the naval battles of Abukir (1799, Battle of the Nile) and Trafalgar (1805), the British had for a long time strengthened their dominance in the Mediterranean. Wars included Naval warfare in the Mediterranean during World War I and Mediterranean theatre of World War II.

With the opening of the lockless Suez Canal in 1869, the flow of trade between Europe and Asia changed fundamentally. The fastest route now led through the Mediterranean towards East Africa and Asia. This led to a preference for the Mediterranean countries and their ports like Trieste with direct connections to Central and Eastern Europe experienced a rapid economic rise. In the 20th century, the 1st and 2nd World Wars as well as the Suez Crisis and the Cold War led to a shift of trade routes to the European northern ports, which changed again towards the southern ports through European integration, the activation of the Silk Road and free world trade.

=== 21st century and migrations ===
Satellite image of the Mediterranean Sea at night

In 2013, the Maltese president described the Mediterranean Sea as a "cemetery" due to the large number of migrants who drowned there after their boats capsized. European Parliament president Martin Schulz said in 2014 that Europe's migration policy "turned the Mediterranean into a graveyard", referring to the number of drowned refugees in the region as a direct result of the policies. An Azerbaijani official described the sea as "a burial ground ... where people die".

Following the 2013 Lampedusa migrant shipwreck, the Italian government decided to strengthen the national system for the patrolling of the Mediterranean Sea by authorising "Operation Mare Nostrum", a military and humanitarian mission in order to rescue the migrants and arrest the traffickers of immigrants. In 2015, more than one million migrants crossed the Mediterranean Sea into Europe.

Italy was particularly affected by the European migrant crisis. Between 2013 and 2018, over 700,000 migrants landed in Italy, mainly sub-Saharan Africans.

== Geography ==
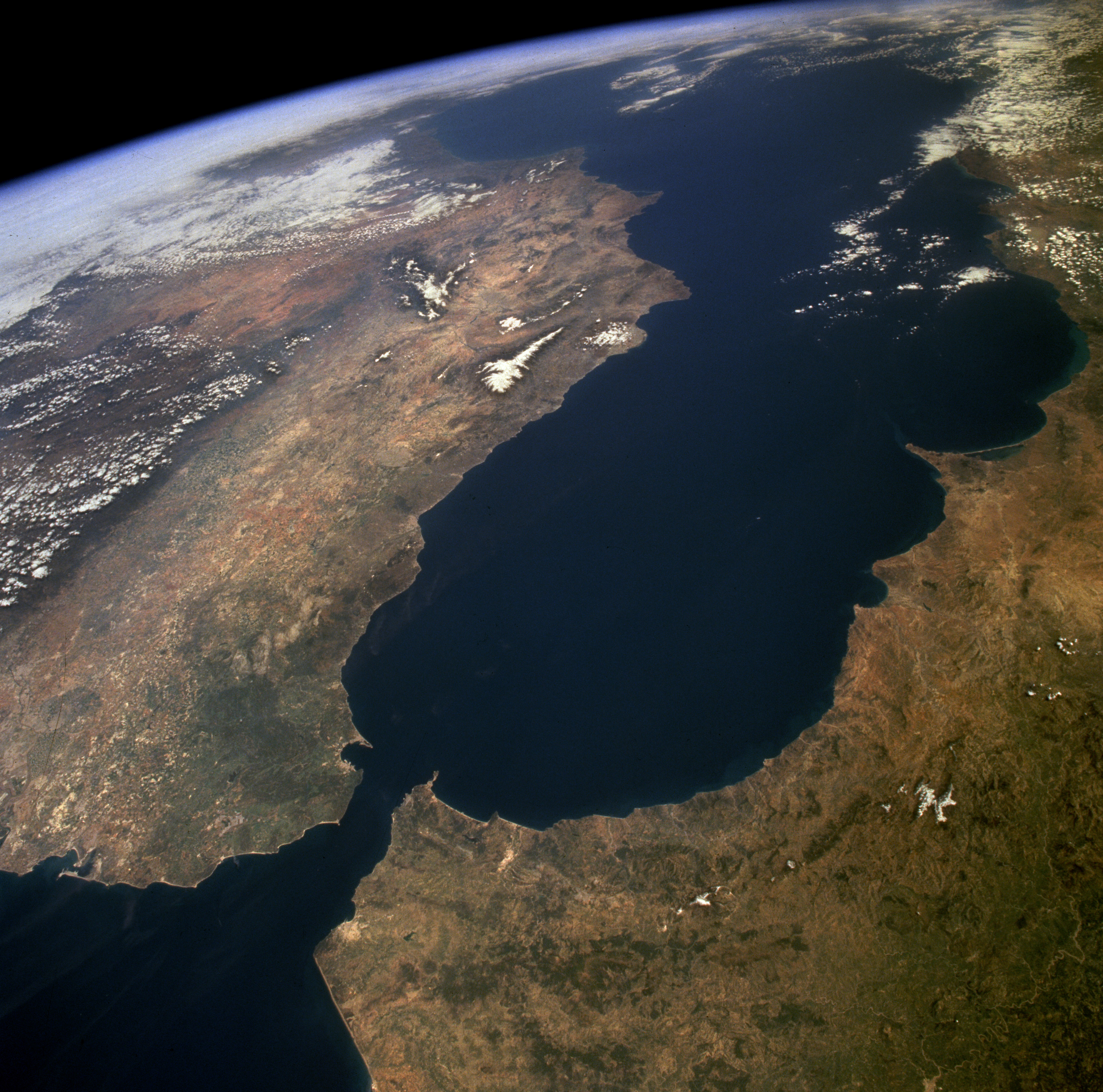
A satellite image showing the Mediterranean Sea. The Strait of Gibraltar appears in the bottom left (north-west) quarter of the image; to its left is the Iberian Peninsula in Europe, and to its right, the Maghreb in Africa.

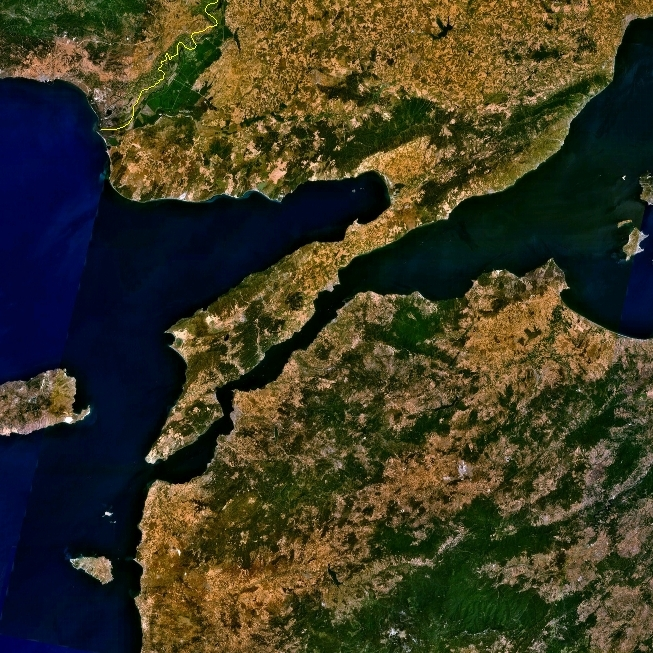
The Dardanelles strait in Turkey. The north (upper) side forms part of Europe (the Gelibolu Peninsula in the Thrace region); on the south (lower) side is Anatolia in Asia.

The Mediterranean Sea connects

- to the Atlantic Ocean by the Strait of Gibraltar (known as the "Pillars of Hercules") in the west. This also separates Europe from Africa
- to the Sea of Marmara and the Black Sea, by the Straits of the Dardanelles and the Bosporus respectively, in the east. This separated Europe from Asia

The coastline length is about 46,000 km (29,000 mi).

The 163 km (101 mi) long artificial Suez Canal in the southeast connects the Mediterranean Sea to the Red Sea without ship lock, because the water level is essentially the same. This separated Africa and Asia.

=== Marginal seas ===
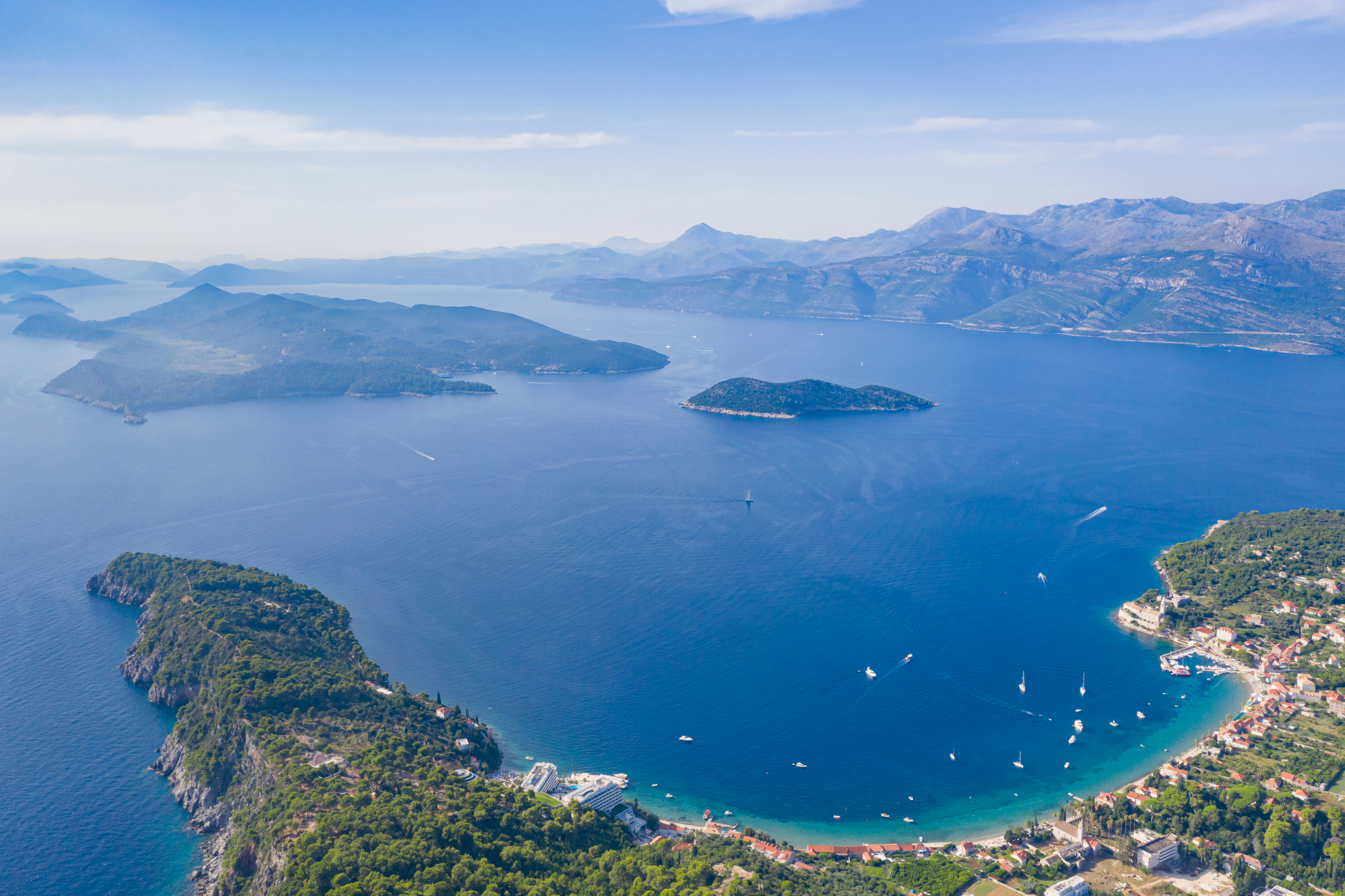
The Elaphiti Islands off the coast of Croatia; the Adriatic Sea contains over 1200 islands and islets.

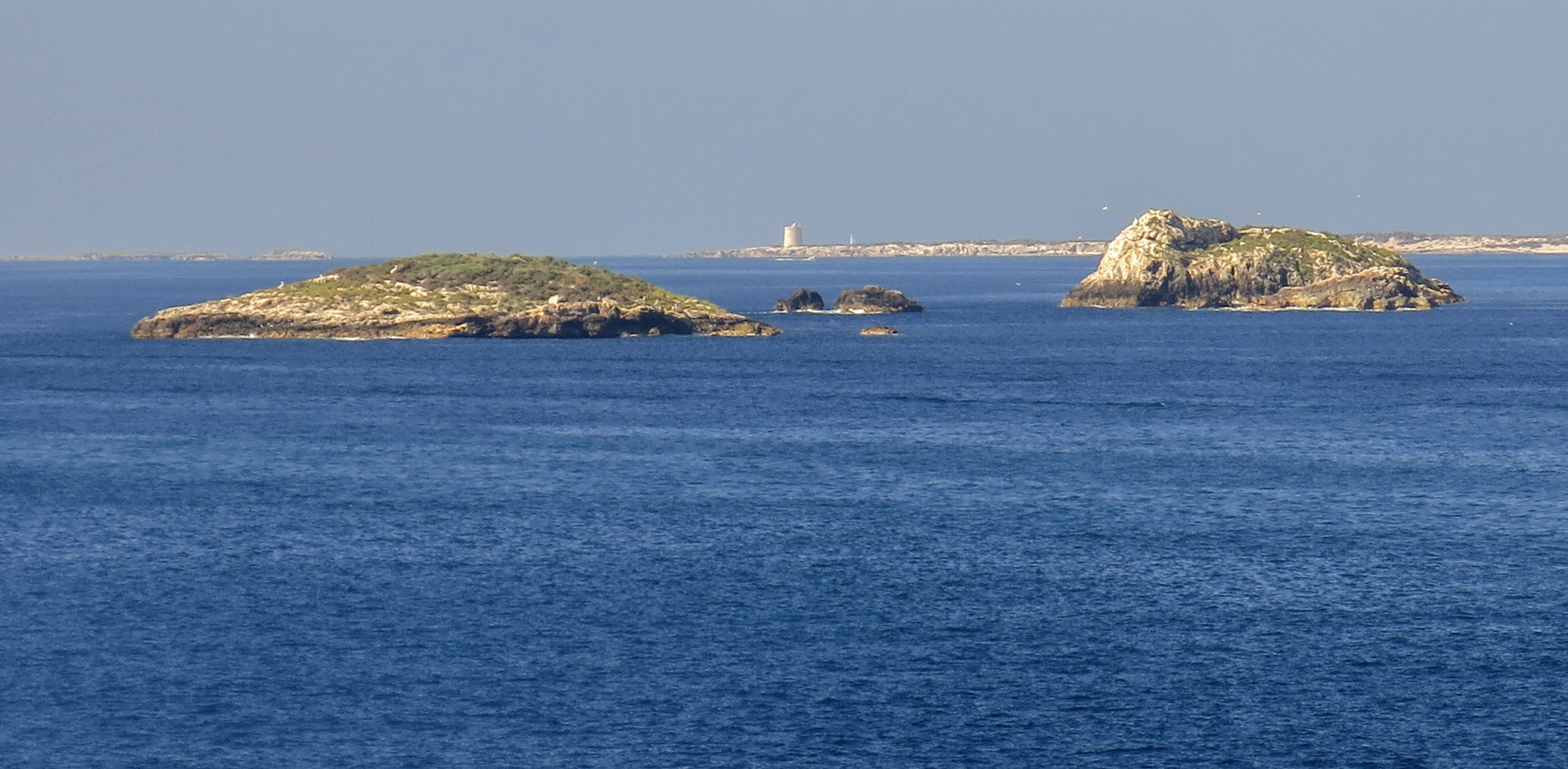
Es Malvins, Balearic Sea

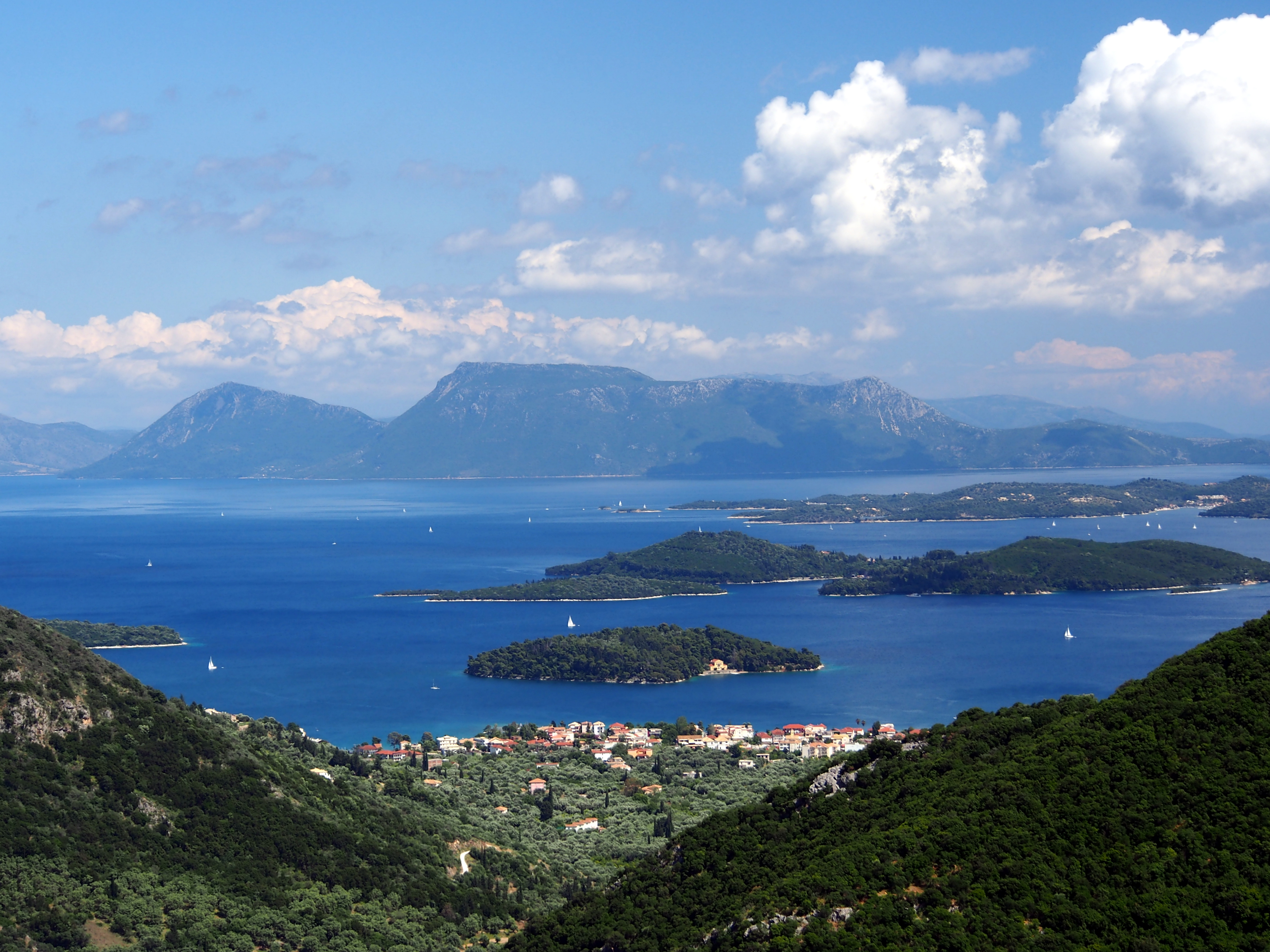
The Ionian Sea, view from the island Lefkada, Greece

The Mediterranean Sea includes 15 marginal seas:

Number	Sea	Area		Marginal countries and territories
Number	Sea	km^{2}	sq mi	Marginal countries and territories
1	Libyan Sea	350,000	140,000	Libya, Greece, Malta, Italy
2	Levantine Sea	320,000	120,000	Turkey, Syria, Lebanon, Israel, Palestine, Egypt, Greece, Cyprus, Akrotiri & Dhekelia
3	Tyrrhenian Sea	275,000	106,000	Italy, France
4	Aegean Sea	214,000	83,000	Greece, Turkey
5	Icarian Sea	(Part of Aegean)		Greece, Turkey
6	Myrtoan Sea	(Part of Aegean)		Greece
7	Thracian Sea	(Part of Aegean)		Greece, Turkey
8	Ionian Sea	169,000	65,000	Greece, Albania, Italy
9	Balearic Sea	150,000	58,000	Spain
10	Adriatic Sea	138,000	53,000	Albania, Bosnia and Herzegovina, Croatia, Italy, Montenegro, Slovenia
11	Sea of Sardinia	120,000	46,000	Italy, Spain
12	Sea of Crete	95,000	37,000 (Part of Aegean)	Greece
13	Ligurian Sea	80,000	31,000	Italy, France
14	Alboran Sea	53,000	20,000	Spain, Morocco, Algeria, Gibraltar
15	Sea of Marmara	11,500	4,400	Turkey
–	Other	500,000	190,000	Consists of gulfs, straits, channels and other parts that do not have the name of a specific sea.
Total	Mediterranean Sea	2,500,000	970,000	

Note 1: The International Hydrographic Organization defines the area as generic Mediterranean Sea, in the Western Basin. It does not recognise the label Sea of Sardinia.

Note 2: Thracian Sea, Icarian Sea, Sea of Crete and Myrtoan Sea are seas that are part of the Aegean Sea.

Note 3: The Black Sea is not considered part of it.

=== Extent ===
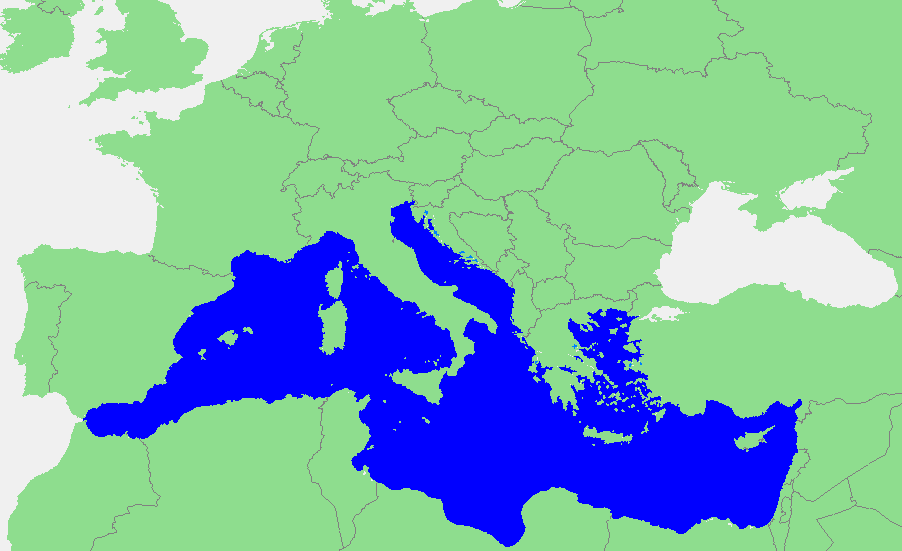
Borders of the Mediterranean Sea

The International Hydrographic Organization defines the limits of the Mediterranean Sea as follows: Stretching from the Strait of Gibraltar in the west to the entrances to the Dardanelles and the Suez Canal in the east, the Mediterranean Sea is bounded by the coasts of Europe, Africa, and Asia and is divided into two deep basins:

- Western Basin:
  - On the west: A line joining the extremities of Cape Trafalgar (Spain) and Cape Spartel (Africa)
  - On the northeast: The west coast of Italy. In the Strait of Messina, a line joining the north extreme of Cape Paci (15°42′E) with Cape Peloro, the east extreme of the Island of Sicily. The north coast of Sicily
  - On the east: A line joining Cape Lilibeo the western point of Sicily (37°47′N 12°22′E), through the Adventure Bank to Cape Bon (Tunisia)
- Eastern Basin:
  - On the west: The northeastern and eastern limits of the Western Basin
  - On the northeast: A line joining Kum Kale (26°11′E) and Cape Helles, the western entrance to the Dardanelles
  - On the southeast: The entrance to the Suez Canal
  - On the east: The coasts of Lebanon, Syria, Israel, and Palestine (through the Gaza Strip)

=== Hydrography ===
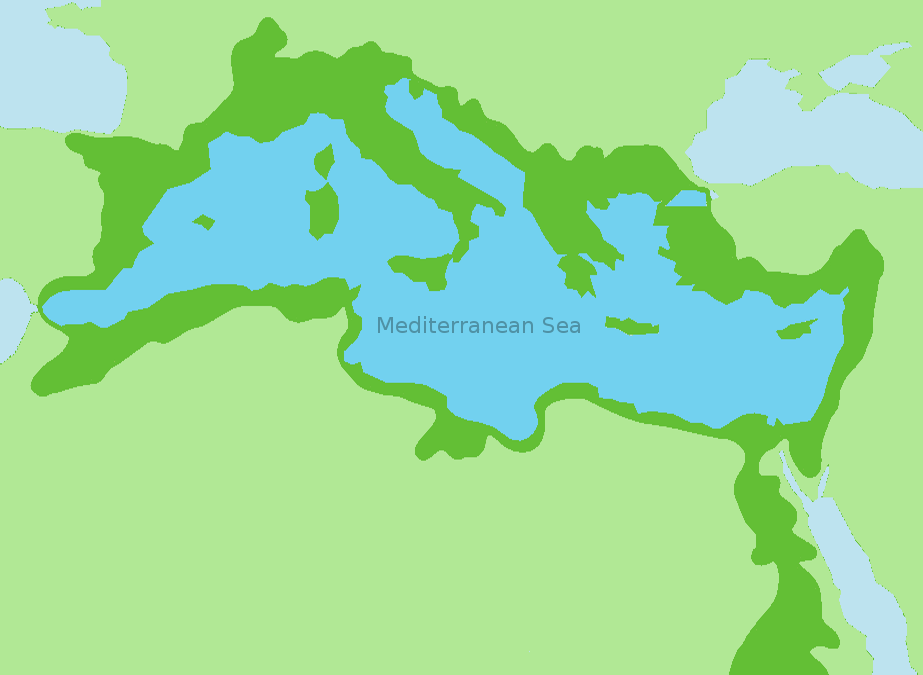
Approximate extent of the Mediterranean drainage basin (dark green). Nile basin only partially shown

The drainage basin of the Mediterranean Sea is particularly heterogeneous and extends much further than the Mediterranean region. Its size has been estimated between 4,000,000 and 5,500,000 km^{2} (1,500,000 and 2,100,000 sq mi), (Note: Not including the area of the Mediterranean Sea) depending on whether non-active parts (deserts) are included or not. The longest river ending in the Mediterranean Sea is the Nile, which takes its sources in equatorial Africa. The basin of the Nile constitutes about two-thirds of the Mediterranean drainage basin and encompasses areas as high as the Ruwenzori Mountains. Among other important rivers in Africa, are the Moulouya and the Chelif, both on the north side of the Atlas Mountains. In Asia, are the Ceyhan and Seyhan, both on the south side of the Taurus Mountains. In Europe, the largest basins are those of the Rhône, Ebro, Po, and Maritsa. The basin of the Rhône is the largest and extends up as far north as the Jura Mountains, encompassing areas even on the north side of the Alps. The basins of the Ebro, Po, and Maritsa, are respectively south of the Pyrenees, Alps, and Balkan Mountains, which are the major ranges bordering Southern Europe.

Total annual precipitation is significantly higher on the European part of the Mediterranean basin, especially near the Alps (the 'water tower of Europe') and other high mountain ranges. As a consequence, the river discharges of the Rhône and Po are similar to that of the Nile, despite the latter having a much larger basin. These are the only three rivers with an average discharge of over 1,000 m^{3}/s (35,000 cu ft/s). Among large natural fresh bodies of water are Lake Victoria (Nile basin), Lake Geneva (Rhône), and the Italian Lakes (Po). While the Mediterranean watershed is bordered by other river basins in Europe, it is essentially bordered by endorheic basins or deserts elsewhere.

The following countries are in the Mediterranean drainage basin while not having a coastline on the Mediterranean Sea:

- In Europe, through various rivers: Andorra, (Note: Through the Ebro) Bulgaria, (Note: Through the Struma, Maritsa and Nestos, see Geography of Bulgaria#Hydrography) Kosovo, (Note: Through the Drin) North Macedonia, (Note: Through the Drin and Vardar) San Marino, (Note: Through the Marecchia) Serbia, (Note: Through the Struma) and Switzerland. (Note: Through the Rhône, Po and Adige, see Hydrology of Switzerland)
- In Africa, through the Nile: Congo, Burundi, Eritrea, Ethiopia, Kenya, Rwanda, South Sudan, Sudan, Tanzania and Uganda.

=== Coastal countries ===
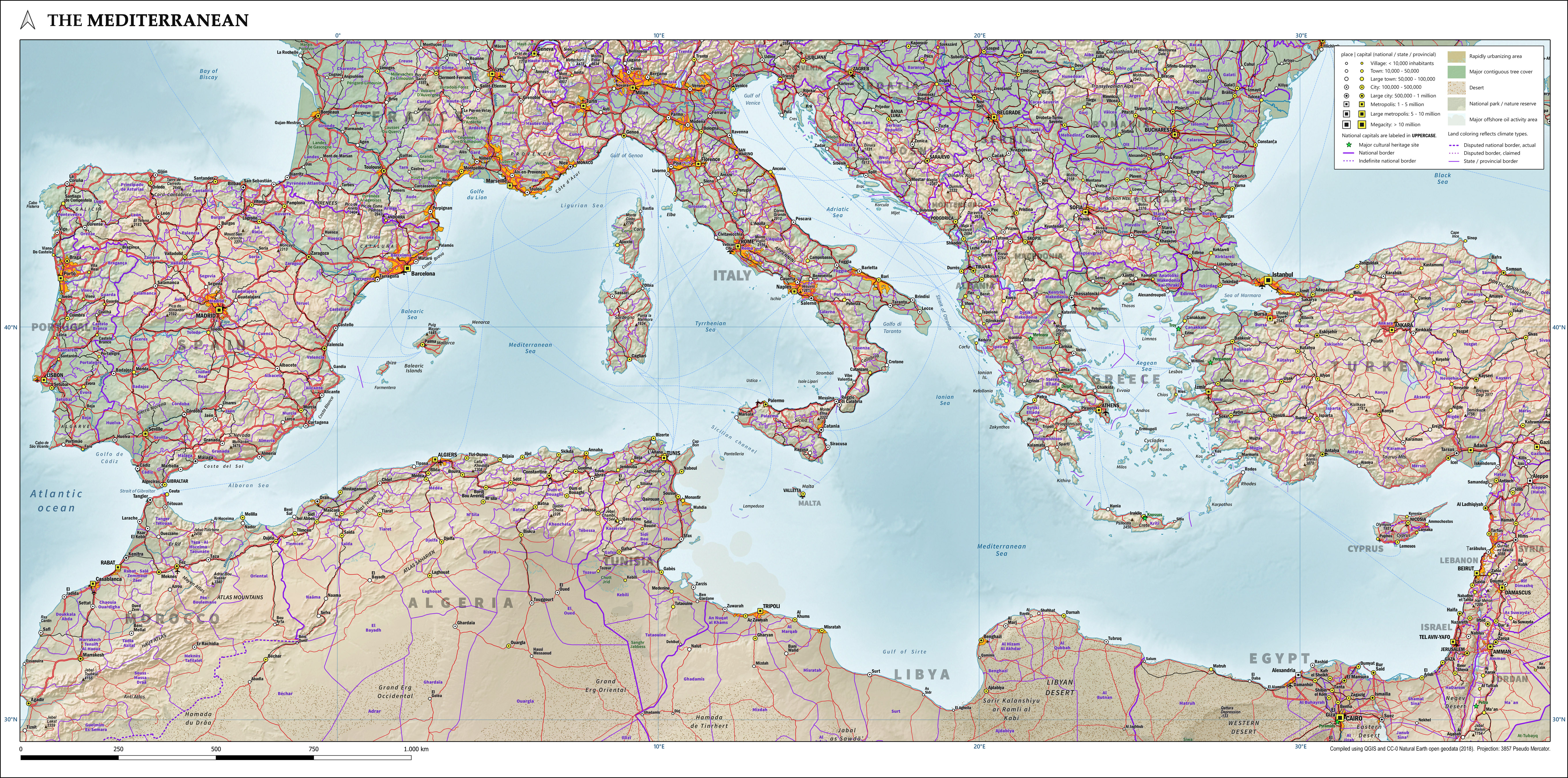
Map of the Mediterranean Sea from open Natural Earth data, 2020

The following countries have a coastline on the Mediterranean Sea:

- European: Spain, France, Italy, Malta, Monaco, Slovenia, Croatia, Bosnia and Herzegovina, Montenegro, Albania, and Greece
- West Asian: Turkey, Syria, Lebanon, Israel, Palestine, and the island of Cyprus
- North African: Morocco, Algeria, Tunisia, Libya, Egypt

=== Exclusive economic zone ===
Exclusive economic zones in Mediterranean Sea:

Number	Country	Area	
Number	Country	km^{2}	sq mi
1	Italy	541,915	209,235
2	Greece	493,708	190,622
3	Libya	355,604	137,299
4	Spain	260,000	100,000
5	Egypt	169,125	65,300
6	Algeria	128,843	49,747
7	Tunisia	102,047	39,401
8	France	88,389	34,127
9	Cyprus	80,412	31,047
10	Turkey	72,195	27,875
11	Croatia	59,032	22,792
12	Malta	55,542	21,445
13	Israel	25,139	9,706
14	Lebanon	19,265	7,438
15	Morocco	18,302	7,066
16	Northern Cyprus	17,676	6,825
17	Albania	13,691	5,286
18	Syria	10,189	3,934
19	Montenegro	7,745	2,990
20	Palestine	2,591	1,000
21	Monaco	288	111
22	Slovenia	220	85
23	Bosnia and Herzegovina	50	19
24	United Kingdom	6.8	2.6
Total	Mediterranean Sea	2,500,000	970,000

=== Subdivisions ===
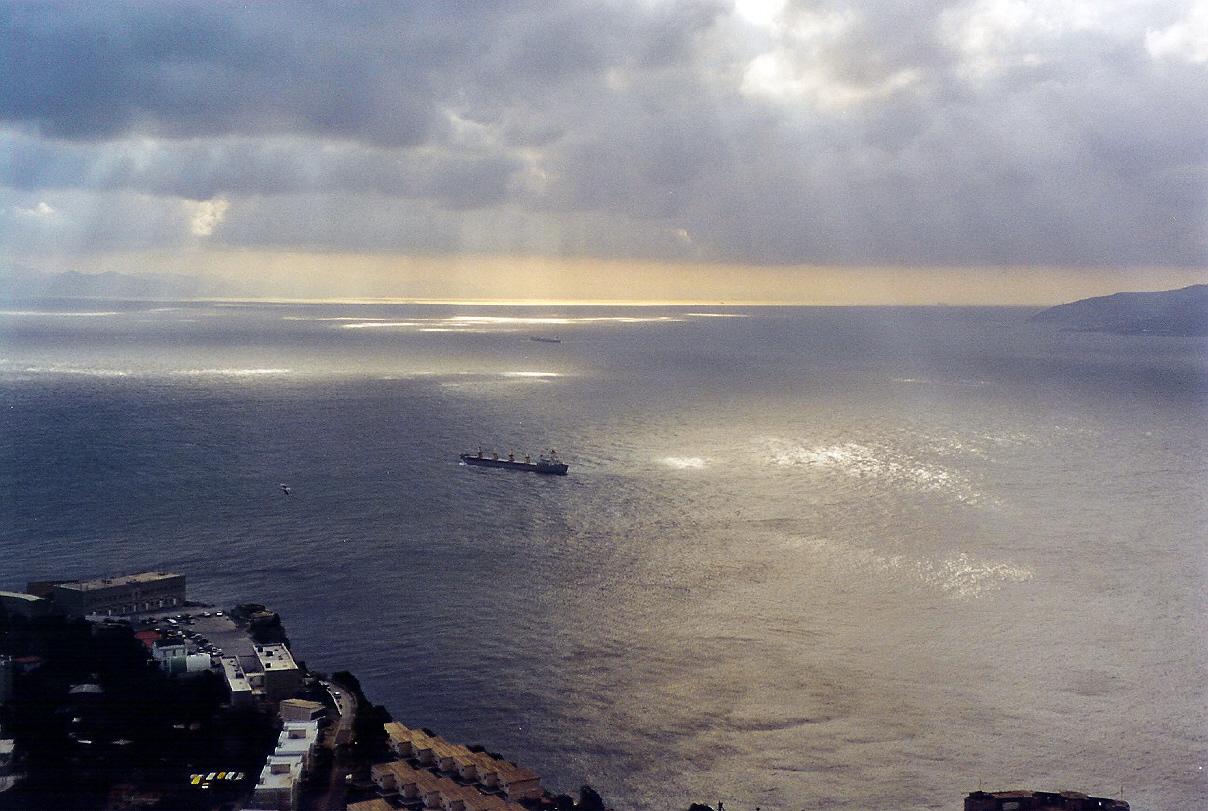
Africa (left, on horizon) and Europe (right), as seen from Gibraltar

The International Hydrographic Organization (IHO) divides the Mediterranean into a number of smaller waterbodies, each with their own designation (from west to east):

- the Strait of Gibraltar
- the Alboran Sea, between Spain and Morocco
- the Balearic Sea, between mainland Spain and its Balearic Islands
- the Ligurian Sea between Corsica and Liguria (Italy)
- the Tyrrhenian Sea enclosed by Sardinia, Corsica, Italian Peninsula and Sicily
- the Ionian Sea between Italy, Albania and Greece
- the Adriatic Sea between Italy, Slovenia, Croatia, Bosnia and Herzegovina, Montenegro and Albania
- the Aegean Sea between Greece and Turkey

=== Largest islands ===
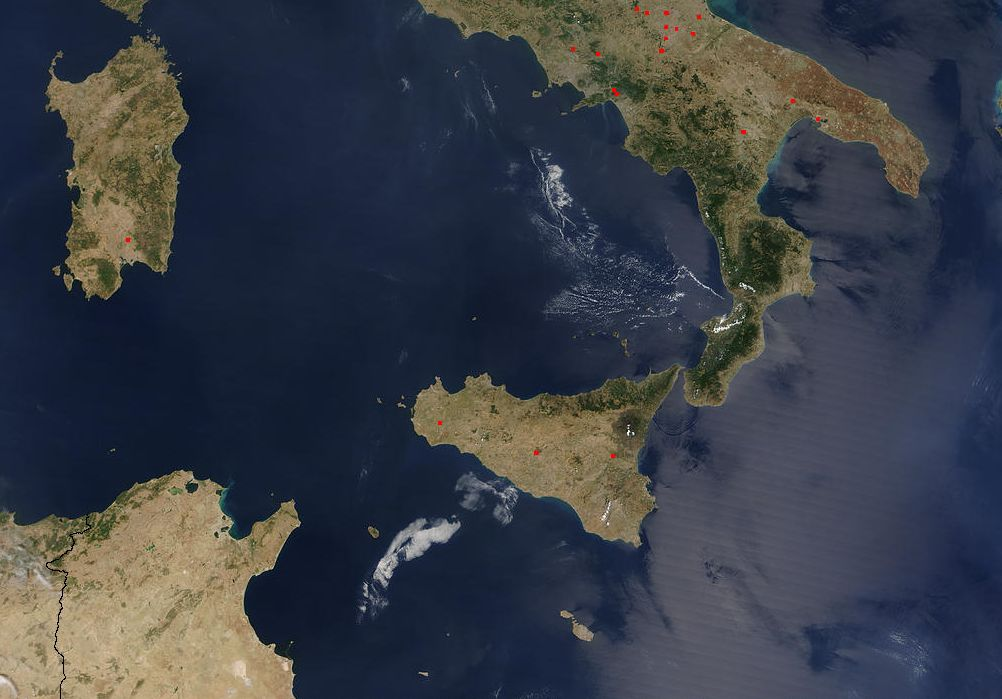
The two biggest islands of the Mediterranean: Sicily and Sardinia (Italy)

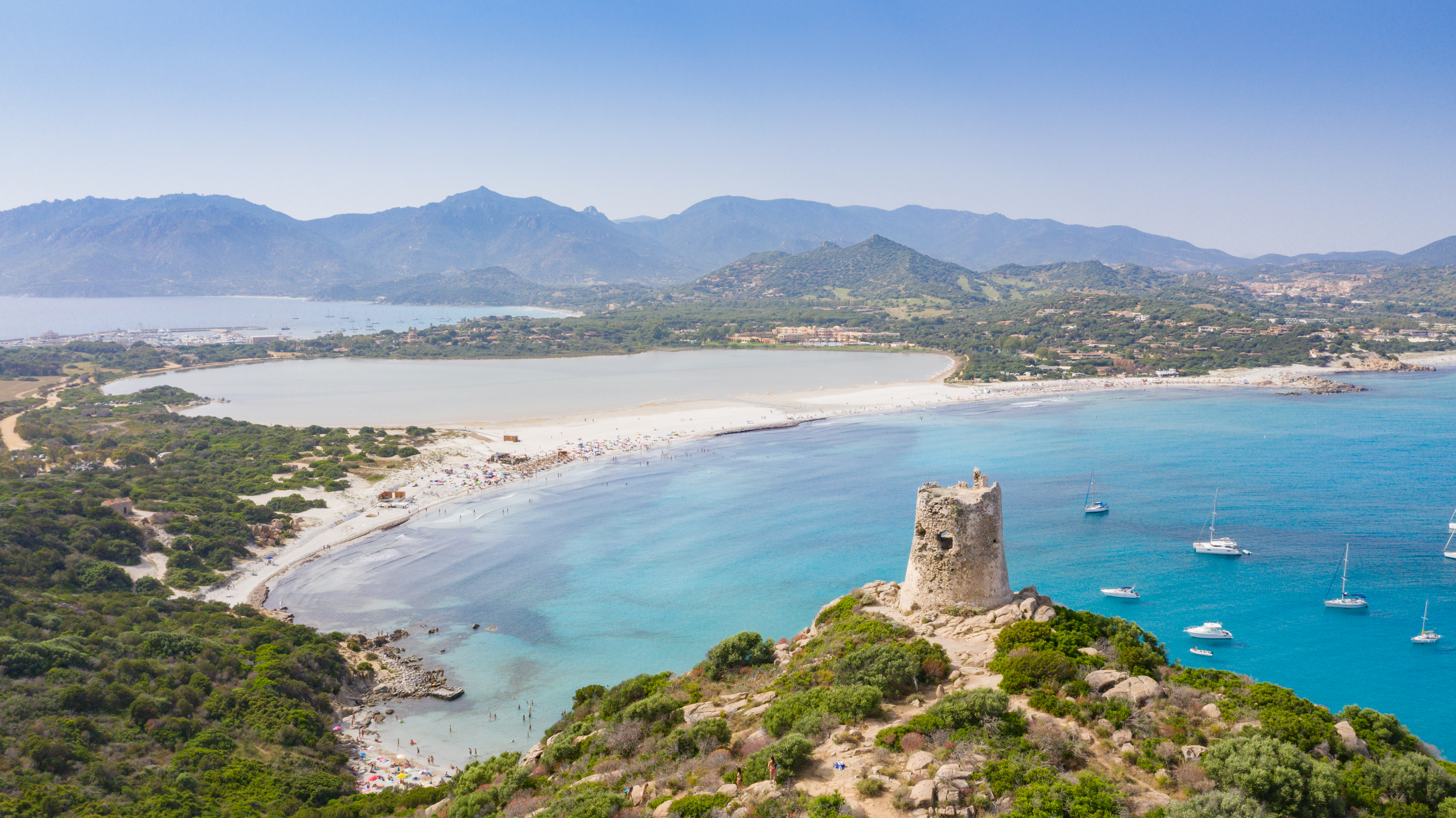
16th century watchtower on the coast of Sardinia

The Mediterranean Sea encompasses about 10,000 islands and islets, of which about 250 are permanently inhabited. In the table below are listed the ten largest by population.

Country	Island	Area		Population
Country	Island	km^{2}	sq mi	Population
Italy	Sicily	25,460	9,830	5,048,995
Italy	Sardinia	23,821	9,197	1,672,804
Cyprus	Cyprus	9,251	3,572	1,088,503
Spain	Mallorca	3,640	1,410	869,067
Greece	Crete	8,336	3,219	623,666
France	Corsica	8,680	3,350	299,209
Greece	Euboea	3,655	1,411	218,000
Tunisia	Djerba	514	198	182,911
Spain	Ibiza	572	221	159,180
Greece	Rhodes	1,400	540	117,007
Greece	Corfu	641	247	101,600
Spain	Menorca	696	269	99,005
Greece	Lesbos	1,632	630	90,643
Greece	Chios	842	325	51,936

=== Climate ===
Much of the Mediterranean coast has a hot-summer Mediterranean climate. The Mediterranean basin has a climate characterised by mild wet winters, and calm, dry and hot summers. Although they are rare, tropical cyclones occasionally form in the Mediterranean Sea, typically in September–November.

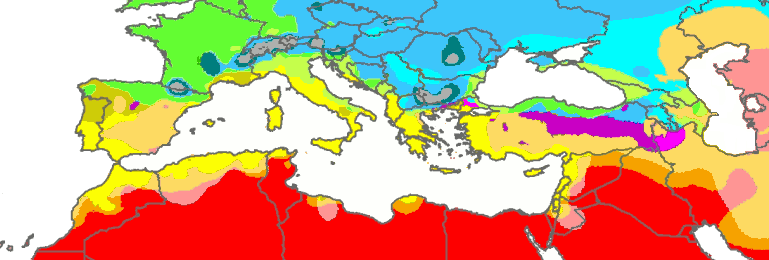
Map of climate zones in the areas surrounding the Mediterranean Sea, according to the Köppen climate classification

==== Sea temperature ====
Mean sea temperature in °C (°F)
	Jan	Feb	Mar	Apr	May	Jun	Jul	Aug	Sep	Oct	Nov	Dec	Year
Málaga	16 (61)	15 (59)	16 (61)	16 (61)	18 (64)	20 (68)	22 (72)	23 (73)	22 (72)	20 (68)	18 (64)	17 (63)	18.6 (65.5)
Barcelona	13 (55)	12 (54)	13 (55)	14 (57)	17 (63)	20 (68)	23 (73)	25 (77)	23 (73)	20 (68)	17 (63)	15 (59)	17.8 (64.0)
Marseille	13 (55)	13 (55)	13 (55)	14 (57)	16 (61)	18 (64)	21 (70)	22 (72)	21 (70)	18 (64)	16 (61)	14 (57)	16.6 (61.9)
Naples	15 (59)	14 (57)	14 (57)	15 (59)	18 (64)	22 (72)	25 (77)	27 (81)	25 (77)	22 (72)	19 (66)	16 (61)	19.3 (66.7)
Malta	16 (61)	16 (61)	15 (59)	16 (61)	18 (64)	21 (70)	24 (75)	26 (79)	25 (77)	23 (73)	21 (70)	18 (64)	19.9 (67.8)
Venice	11 (52)	10 (50)	11 (52)	13 (55)	18 (64)	22 (72)	25 (77)	26 (79)	23 (73)	20 (68)	16 (61)	14 (57)	17.4 (63.3)
Athens	16 (61)	15 (59)	15 (59)	16 (61)	18 (64)	21 (70)	24 (75)	24 (75)	24 (75)	21 (70)	19 (66)	18 (64)	19.3 (66.7)
Heraklion	16 (61)	15 (59)	15 (59)	16 (61)	19 (66)	22 (72)	24 (75)	25 (77)	24 (75)	22 (72)	20 (68)	18 (64)	19.7 (67.5)
Antalya	17 (63)	17 (63)	16 (61)	17 (63)	21 (70)	24 (75)	27 (81)	29 (84)	27 (81)	25 (77)	22 (72)	19 (66)	21.8 (71.2)
Limassol	18 (64)	17 (63)	17 (63)	18 (64)	20 (68)	24 (75)	26 (79)	28 (82)	27 (81)	25 (77)	22 (72)	19 (66)	21.7 (71.1)
Mersin	18 (64)	17 (63)	17 (63)	18 (64)	21 (70)	25 (77)	28 (82)	29 (84)	28 (82)	25 (77)	22 (72)	19 (66)	22.3 (72.1)
Tel Aviv	18 (64)	17 (63)	17 (63)	18 (64)	21 (70)	24 (75)	27 (81)	28 (82)	28 (82)	26 (79)	23 (73)	20 (68)	22.3 (72.1)
Alexandria	18 (64)	17 (63)	17 (63)	18 (64)	20 (68)	23 (73)	25 (77)	26 (79)	26 (79)	25 (77)	22 (72)	20 (68)	21.4 (70.5)

== Seabed ==
The Mediterranean Sea has numerous underwater geological features formed by the subduction of the African Plate beneath the Eurasian Plate. The sea is divided naturally into western and eastern regions by the Malta Escarpment that runs from the island of Sicily to the African coast.

The western Mediterranean region may be separated into three main underwater basins:

- the Alboran Basin lies between the Moroccan and Spanish coasts, east of Gibraltar, west of Sardinia and Corsica, which acts as a gateway between the Atlantic Ocean and the Mediterranean Sea and is a biodiversity hotspot.
- the Algerian Basin stretches from the Algerian coast to the French coast, and includes depths of up to 2,800 metres (9,200 ft). There has been significant hydrocarbon exploration, particularly off the coasts of Algeria, Libya, and Tunisia; The Campi Flegrei del Mar di Sicilia is a field of submarine volcanoes located about 40 kilometres (25 mi) southwest of Sicily very close to sea level and which temporarily emerge above sea level during significant eruptions. These include Ferdinandea, also known as Graham Island, and Empedocles;
- the Tyrrhenian Basin, also referred to as the Tyrrhenian Sea, between Italy and the islands of Sardinia and Corsica. The basin includes Marsili, a large undersea volcano in the Tyrrhenian Sea, about 175 kilometres (109 mi) south of Naples, and the Palinuro Seamount, one of the largest in the Tyrrhenian Sea and lies about 30 kilometres (19 mi) northeast from Marsili. Marsili is one of the largest volcanoes in Europe, with a length of 70 kilometres (43 mi) and a width of 30 kilometres, larger than Mount Etna and part of the Aeolian Islands volcanic arc.

The eastern Mediterranean region may also be subdivided into the following underwater basins:

- the Ionian Basin, which is a deep and narrow oceanic basin, stretches south of Italy, Albania, and Greece and contains the Calypso Deep, also known as the Oinousses or Vavilov Deep, featuring the deepest point in the Mediterranean Sea, located in the Hellenic Trench, 62.6 kilometres (38.9 mi) southwest of Pylos, Greece, with a maximum depth of approximately 4,900 metres (16,000 ft);
- the Levantine Basin to the south of Anatolia separated from the Ionian Basin by the Mediterranean Ridge. The 1,300-kilometre (810 mi)-long submarine ridge running from Calabria along the south of Crete, to the southwest corner of Turkey is a 150-to-300-kilometre (93 to 186 mi)-wide curved feature, which is also known for its mud volcanoes and dome-like structures and has been the subject of studies on the Messinian salinity crisis. The Eratosthenes Seamount, a carbonate seamount is found in the Levantine basin about 100 kilometres (62 mi) south of western Cyprus.
- the island of Crete delineates the Levantine Basin from the Aegean Sea, which is that portion of the Mediterranean Sea north of Crete and is bordered on the east by the coast of Turkey and on the west and north by the coast of Greece. Numerous Greek islands and seamounts are located in the Aegean Sea; and
- the Adriatic Sea, which is northwest of the eastern Mediterranean Sea's main body, is bordered to the east by Slovenia, Croatia, Bosnia and Herzegovina, Montenegro, and Albania, and to the west and north by Italy.

Until the 1960s, the Mediterranean was believed to be the primary remaining portion of the earlier (200 million years old) Mesozoic Tethys Ocean, which once encircled the Eastern Hemisphere. However, since the late 20th century, research using the theory of seafloor spreading has indicated that most of the current Mediterranean seafloor is not a portion of the Tethys sea floor. Some researchers consider the Ionian Basin, to the east of the Malta Escarpment, to be the remnant of the Tethys Ocean. Over the course of the last 44 million years, the continental plates of Africa and Eurasia have converged and receded, resulting in the current tectonically active basin and its surrounding mountain chains. According to the interpretation of geologic data, there are currently several major places where Africa and Eurasia collide, causing land submergence, mountain building, and volcanism.

Sediment cores drilled in 1970 and 1975 led to theories that about 6 million years ago, the Mediterranean was around 3,000 metres (10,000 ft) below the current sea level and included arid deserts blanketed with evaporite salts. It was thought that Gibraltar's high ridges prevented Atlantic waters from entering until roughly 5.5 million years ago, when they broke through and flooded the Mediterranean. According to more recent seismic and microfossil research, the seafloor was never entirely dry. Rather, approximately 5 million years ago, the seafloor was made up of many basins with varying topography and sizes, spanning in depth from 200 to 1,520 metres (650 to 5,000 ft). Salts were likely accumulated on the bottom of highly salinised waters of widely differing depths. The uncertainty of the timing and nature of sea-bottom salt formation and evidence from later seismic research and core samples has been the subject of intense scientific debate.

=== Malta Escarpment ===
The Malta Escarpment is a 250-kilometre (160 mi) undersea limestone escarpment that stretches south from Sicily's eastern coast to the Maltese islands' eastern coast and beyond, primarily formed due to tectonic activities. There are more than 500 undersea canyons along the cliffs, which can reach heights of 3.5 kilometres (2.2 mi) in some locations. Rich biological communities may be found in the canyons, which also serve as channels for contaminants and nutrients due to underwater currents. These deep valleys are special due to the fact that they were not carved out by surface rivers. Underwater landslides are among the natural hazards found on the Malta Escarpment. The University of Malta, UK National Oceanography Centre, New Zealand National Institute of Water and Atmospheric Research, University College Dublin and Italy's Istituto Nazionale di Oceanografia e Geofisica collaborated on a recent study financed by the European Union that focused on the Escarpment.

== Oceanography ==
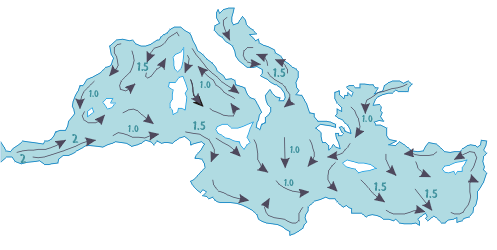
Predominant surface currents for June

Evaporation greatly exceeds precipitation and river runoff in the Mediterranean, a fact that is central to the water circulation within the basin. Evaporation is especially high in its eastern half, causing the water level to decrease and salinity to increase eastward. The average salinity in the basin is 38 PSU at 5 m (16 ft) depth.

The temperature of the water in the deepest part of the Mediterranean Sea is 13.2 °C (55.8 °F).

The net water influx from the Atlantic Ocean is ca. 70,000 m^{3}/s (2.5 million cu ft/s) or 2.2×10^{12} m^{3}/a (7.8×10^{13} cu ft/a). Without this Atlantic water, the sea level of the Mediterranean Sea would fall at a rate of about 1 m (3 ft) per year.

In oceanography, it is sometimes called the Eurafrican Mediterranean Sea, the European Mediterranean Sea or the African Mediterranean Sea to distinguish it from mediterranean seas elsewhere, like the Baltic Sea, and the North-east Atlantic Ocean.

=== General circulation ===
Water circulation in the Mediterranean can be attributed to the surface waters entering from the Atlantic through the Strait of Gibraltar (and also low salinity water entering the Mediterranean from the Black Sea through the Bosphorus). The cool and relatively low-salinity Atlantic water circulates eastwards along the North African coasts. A part of the surface water does not pass the Strait of Sicily, but deviates towards Corsica before exiting the Mediterranean. The surface waters entering the eastern Mediterranean Basin circulate along the Libyan and Israeli coasts. Upon reaching the Levantine Sea, the surface water, having warmed and increased its salinity from its initial Atlantic state, is now denser and sinks to form the Levantine Intermediate Waters (LIW). Most of the water found anywhere between 50 and 600 m (160 and 2,000 ft) deep in the Mediterranean originates from the LIW.

LIW are formed along the coasts of Turkey and circulate westwards along the Greek and south Italian coasts. LIW are the only waters passing the Sicily Strait westwards. After the Strait of Sicily, the LIW circulate along the Italian, French and Spanish coasts before exiting the Mediterranean through the depths of the Strait of Gibraltar. Deep water in the Mediterranean originates from three main areas: the Adriatic Sea, from which most of the deep water in the eastern Mediterranean originates, the Aegean Sea, and the Gulf of Lion. Deep water formation in the Mediterranean is triggered by strong winter convection fuelled by intense cold winds like Bora and Mistral. When new deep water is formed, the older waters mix with the overlaying intermediate waters and eventually exit the Mediterranean. The residence time of water in the Mediterranean is approximately 100 years, making the Mediterranean especially sensitive to climate change (see below).

=== Other events affecting water circulation ===
Being a semi-enclosed basin, the Mediterranean experiences transitory events that can affect the water circulation on short time scales. In the mid-1990s, the Aegean Sea became the main area for deep water formation in the eastern Mediterranean after particularly cold winter conditions. This transitory switch in the origin of deep waters in the eastern Mediterranean was termed Eastern Mediterranean Transient (EMT) and had major consequences on water circulation of the Mediterranean.

Another example of a transient event affecting the Mediterranean circulation is the periodic inversion of the North Ionian Gyre, which is an anticyclonic ocean gyre observed in the northern part of the Ionian Sea, off the Greek coast. The transition from anticyclonic to cyclonic rotation of this gyre changes the origin of the waters fuelling it; when the circulation is anticyclonic (most common), the waters of the gyre originate from the Adriatic Sea. When the circulation is cyclonic, the waters originate from the Levantine Sea. These waters have different physical and chemical characteristics, and the periodic inversion of the North Ionian Gyre (called Bimodal Oscillating System or BiOS) changes the Mediterranean circulation and biogeochemistry around the Adriatic and Levantine regions.

=== Climate change ===
Because of the short residence time of its waters, the Mediterranean Sea is considered a hot-spot for climate change records, registering indeed marked increases in temperature across the entire water column since the 1950s. According to climate projections, the decrease in precipitation over the region will lead to more evaporation, ultimately increasing marine salinity. As a result of both temperature and salinity increases, the Mediterranean Sea is likely to become more stratified by the end of the 21st century, with notable consequences on water circulation and biogeochemistry. The stratification and warming have already led the eastern Mediterranean to become a net source of CO_{2} to the atmosphere.

Human-induced climate change appears to play a growing role in the development of marine heatwaves that have become a prominent subject of research in recent years, particularly in the Mediterranean where a number of areas in both western and eastern sub-basins now experience peaks of temperatures, along with more frequent, more intense, more prolonged warming events than ever seen on record. These events, mainly driven by a combination of oceanic and atmospheric factors, are often triggered by high pressure systems that will reduce cloud cover and increase solar absorption by the sea surface. Their impacts on marine ecosystems, such as mass mortality in benthic communities, coral bleaching events, disruptions in fishery catches and shifts in species distributions, can be devastating. Extreme warming can lead to biodiversity loss and presents an existential threat to some habitats while making conditions more hospitable to invasive tropical species.

== Biogeochemistry ==
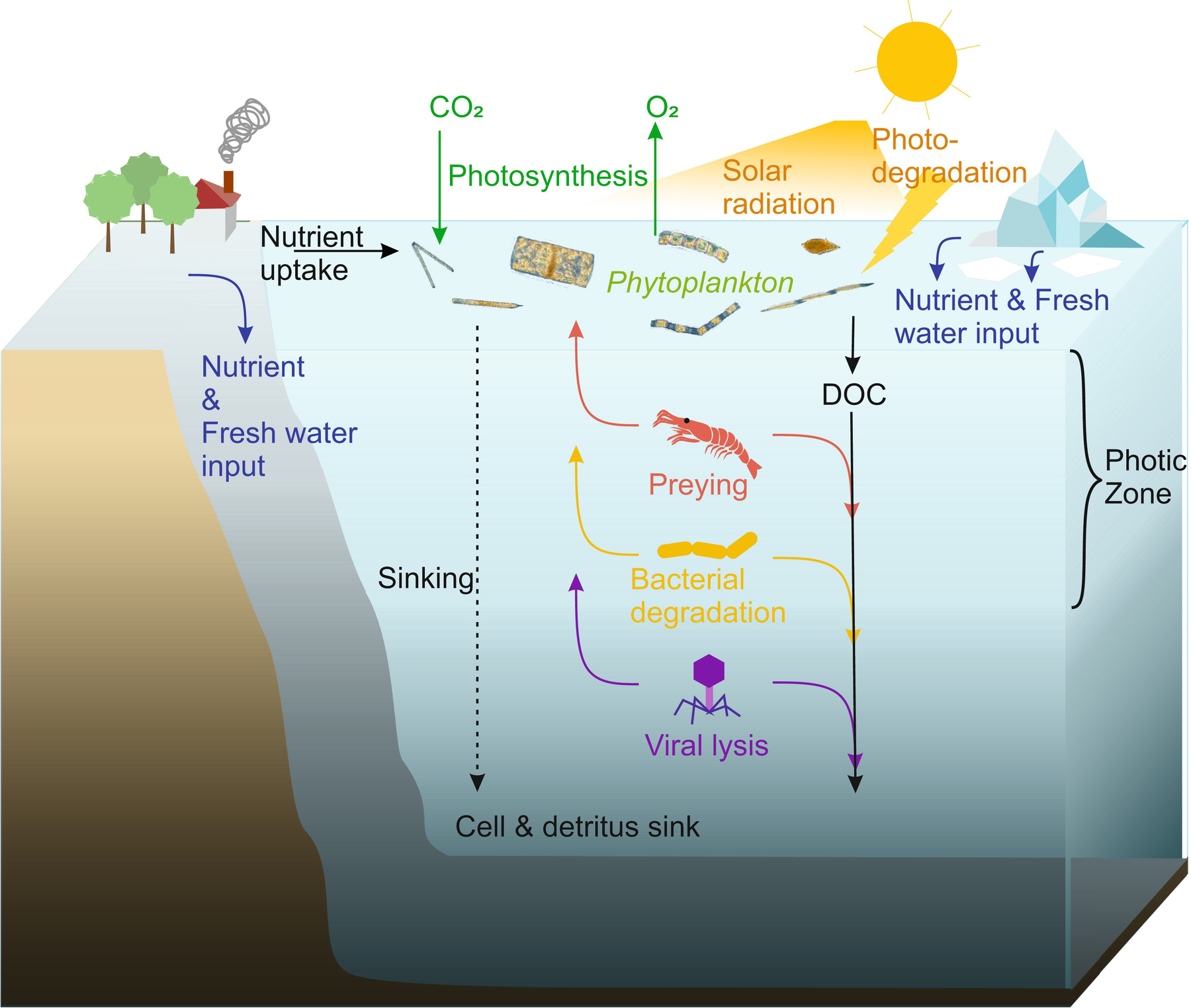
Cycling of marine phytoplankton

In spite of its great biodiversity, concentrations of chlorophyll and nutrients in the Mediterranean Sea are very low, making it one of the most oligotrophic ocean regions in the world. The Mediterranean Sea is commonly referred to as an LNLC (Low-Nutrient, Low-Chlorophyll) area. The Mediterranean Sea fits the definition of a desert in which its nutrient contents are low, making it difficult for plants and animals to develop.

There are steep gradients in nutrient concentrations, chlorophyll concentrations and primary productivity in the Mediterranean. Nutrient concentrations in the western part of the basin are about double the concentrations in the eastern basin. The Alboran Sea, close to the Strait of Gibraltar, has a daily primary productivity of about 0.25 g C (grams of carbon) m^{−2} day^{−1} whereas the eastern basin has an average daily productivity of 0.16 g C m^{−2} day^{−1}. For this reason, the eastern part of the Mediterranean Sea is termed "ultraoligotrophic". The productive areas of the Mediterranean Sea are few and small. High (i.e. more than 0.5 grams of Chlorophyll a per cubic metre) productivity occurs in coastal areas, close to the river mouths which are the primary suppliers of dissolved nutrients. The Gulf of Lion has a relatively high productivity because it is an area of high vertical mixing, bringing nutrients to the surface waters that can be used by phytoplankton to produce Chlorophyll a.

Primary productivity in the Mediterranean is also marked by an intense seasonal variability. In winter, the strong winds and precipitation over the basin generate vertical mixing, bringing nutrients from the deep waters to the surface, where phytoplankton can convert it into biomass. However, in winter, light may be the limiting factor for primary productivity. Between March and April, spring offers the ideal trade-off between light intensity and nutrient concentrations in surface for a spring bloom to occur. In summer, high atmospheric temperatures lead to the warming of the surface waters. The resulting density difference virtually isolates the surface waters from the rest of the water column and nutrient exchanges are limited. As a consequence, primary productivity is very low between June and October.

Oceanographic expeditions uncovered a characteristic feature of the Mediterranean Sea biogeochemistry: most of the chlorophyll production does not occur on the surface, but in sub-surface waters between 80 and 200 metres deep. Another key characteristic of the Mediterranean is its high nitrogen-to-phosphorus ratio (N:P). Redfield demonstrated that most of the world's oceans have an average N:P ratio around 16. However, the Mediterranean Sea has an average N:P between 24 and 29, which translates a widespread phosphorus limitation.

Because of its low productivity, plankton assemblages in the Mediterranean Sea are dominated by small organisms such as picophytoplankton and bacteria.

== Geology ==
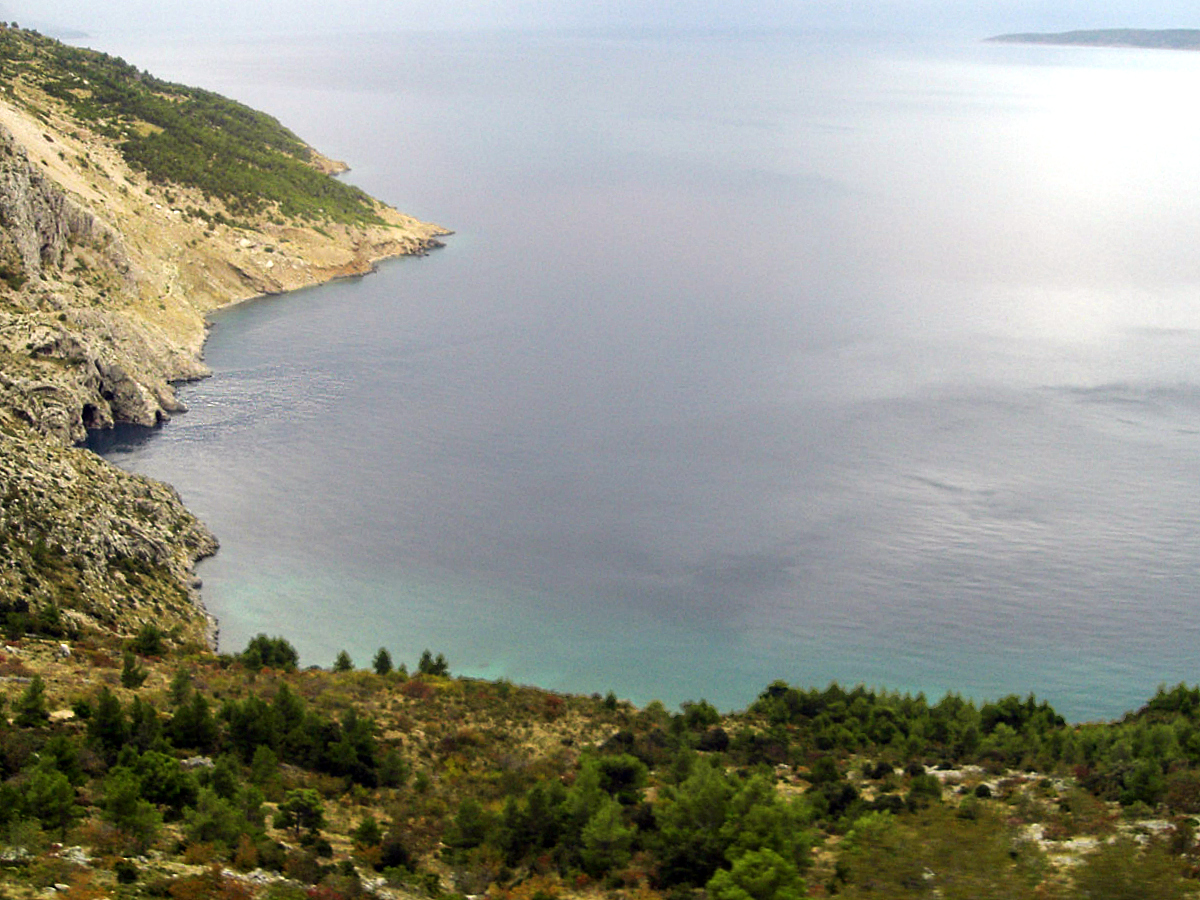
A submarine karst spring, called vrulja, near Omiš; observed through several ripplings of an otherwise calm sea surface.

The geologic history of the Mediterranean Sea is complex. Underlain by oceanic crust, the sea basin was once thought to be a tectonic remnant of the ancient Tethys Ocean; it is now known to be a structurally younger basin, called the Neotethys, which was first formed by the convergence of the African Plate and Eurasian Plate during the Late Triassic and Early Jurassic. Because it is a near-landlocked body of water in a normally dry climate, the Mediterranean is subject to intensive evaporation and the precipitation of evaporites. The Messinian salinity crisis started about six million years ago (mya) when the Mediterranean became landlocked, and then essentially dried up. There are salt deposits accumulated on the bottom of the basin of more than a million cubic kilometres—in some places more than three kilometres thick.

Scientists estimate that the sea was last filled about 5.3 million years ago (mya) in less than two years by the Zanclean flood. Water poured in from the Atlantic Ocean through a newly breached gateway now called the Strait of Gibraltar at an estimated rate of about three orders of magnitude (one thousand times) larger than the current flow of the Amazon River.

The Mediterranean Sea has an average depth of 1,500 m (4,900 ft) and the deepest recorded point is 5,267 m (17,280 ft) in the Calypso Deep in the Ionian Sea. The coastline extends for 46,000 km (29,000 mi). A shallow submarine ridge (the Strait of Sicily) between the island of Sicily and the coast of Tunisia divides the sea in two main subregions: the Western Mediterranean, with an area of about 850,000 km^{2} (330,000 sq mi); and the Eastern Mediterranean, of about 1.65 million km^{2} (640,000 sq mi). Coastal areas have submarine karst springs or vruljas, which discharge pressurised groundwater into the water from below the surface; the discharge water is usually fresh, and sometimes may be thermal.

=== Messinian salinity crisis ===
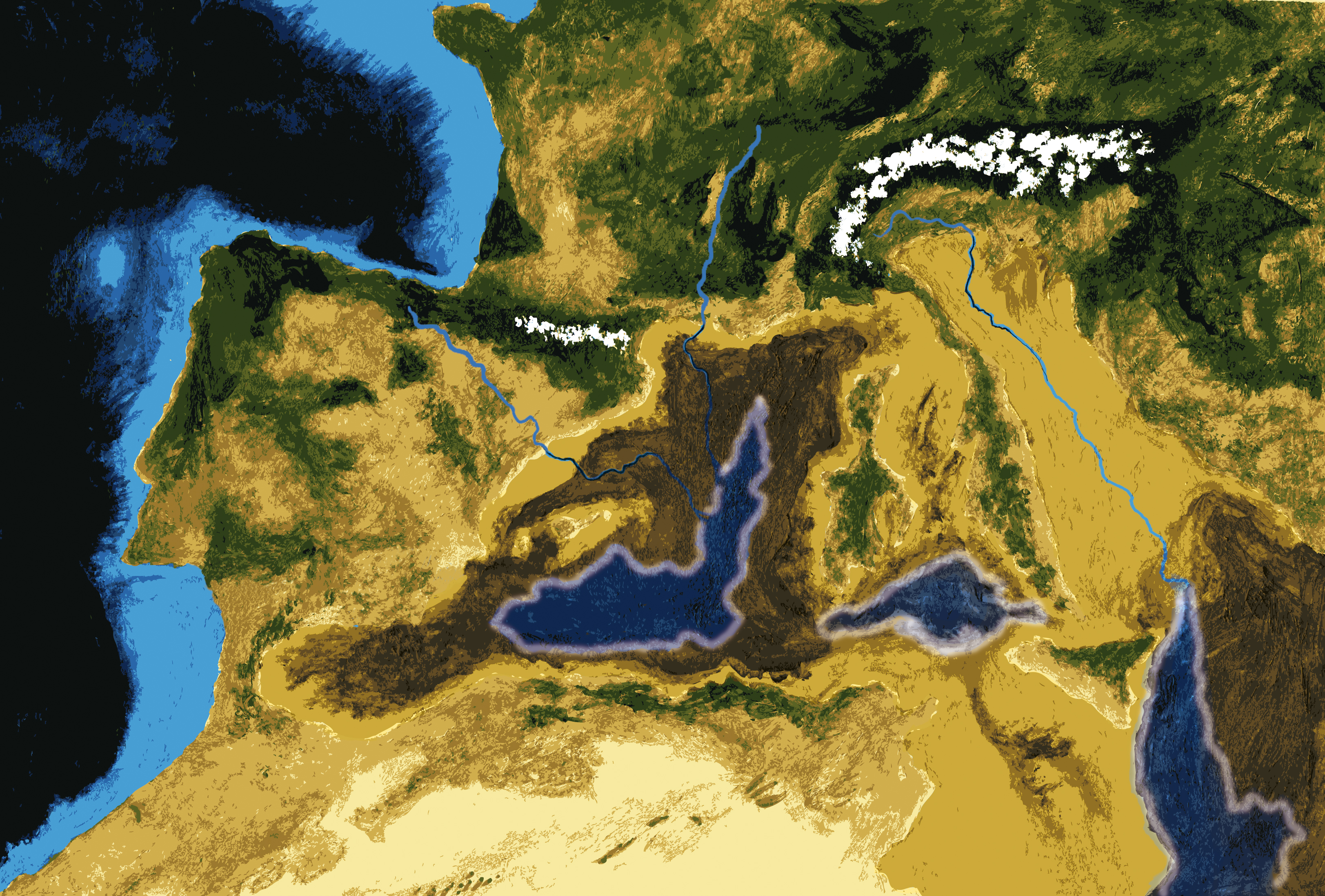
Messinian salinity crisis before the Zanclean flood

Animation: Messinian salinity crisis

During Mesozoic and Cenozoic times, as the northwest corner of Africa converged on Iberia, it lifted the Betic-Rif mountain belts across southern Iberia and northwest Africa. There the development of the intramontane Betic and Rif basins created two roughly parallel marine gateways between the Atlantic Ocean and the Mediterranean Sea. Dubbed the Betic and Rifian corridors, they gradually closed during the middle and late Miocene: perhaps several times. In the late Miocene the closure of the Betic Corridor triggered the so-called "Messinian salinity crisis" (MSC), characterised by the deposition of a thick evaporitic sequence – with salt deposits up to 2 km thick in the Levantine sea – and by a massive drop in water level in much of the Basin. This event was for long the subject of acute scientific controversy, now much appeased, regarding its sequence, geographic range, processes leading to evaporite facies and salt deposits. The start of the MSC was recently estimated astronomically at 5.96 mya, and it persisted for some 630,000 years until about 5.3 mya; see Animation: Messinian salinity crisis, at right.

After the initial drawdown and re-flooding, there followed more episodes—the total number is debated—of sea drawdowns and re-floodings for the duration of the MSC. It ended when the Atlantic Ocean last re-flooded the basin—creating the Strait of Gibraltar and causing the Zanclean flood—at the end of the Miocene (5.33 mya). Some research has suggested that a desiccation-flooding-desiccation cycle may have repeated several times, which could explain several events of large amounts of salt deposition. Recent studies, however, show that repeated desiccation and re-flooding is unlikely from a geodynamic point of view.

=== Desiccation and exchanges of flora and fauna ===
The present-day Atlantic gateway, the Strait of Gibraltar, originated in the early Pliocene via the Zanclean Flood. As mentioned, there were two earlier gateways: the Betic Corridor across southern Spain and the Rifian Corridor across northern Morocco. The Betic closed about 6 mya, causing the Messinian salinity crisis (MSC); the Rifian or possibly both gateways closed during the earlier Tortonian times, causing a "Tortonian salinity crisis" (from 11.6 to 7.2 mya), long before the MSC and lasting much longer. Both "crises" resulted in broad connections between the mainlands of Africa and Europe, which allowed migrations of flora and fauna—especially large mammals including primates—between the two continents. The Vallesian crisis indicates a typical extinction and replacement of mammal species in Europe during Tortonian times following climatic upheaval and overland migrations of new species.

Today, evaporation of surface seawater (output) is more than the supply (input) of fresh water by precipitation and coastal drainage systems, causing the salinity of the Mediterranean to be much higher than that of the Atlantic—so much so that the saltier Mediterranean waters sink below the waters incoming from the Atlantic, causing a two-layer flow across the Strait of Gibraltar: that is, an outflow submarine current of warm saline Mediterranean water, counterbalanced by an inflow surface current of less saline cold oceanic water from the Atlantic. In the 1920s, Herman Sörgel proposed the building of a hydroelectric dam (the Atlantropa project) across the Straits, using the inflow current to provide a large amount of hydroelectric energy. The underlying energy grid was also intended to support a political union between Europe and, at least, the Maghreb part of Africa (compare Eurafrika for the later impact and Desertec for a later project with some parallels in the planned grid).

== Paleoclimate ==
Because of its latitude and its landlocked position, the Mediterranean is especially sensitive to astronomically induced climatic variations, which are well documented in its sedimentary record. Since the Mediterranean is subject to the deposition of eolian dust from the Sahara during dry periods, whereas riverine detrital input prevails during wet ones, the Mediterranean marine sapropel-bearing sequences provide high-resolution climatic information. These data have been employed in reconstructing astronomically calibrated time scales for the last 9 Ma of the Earth's history, helping to constrain the time of past geomagnetic reversals.

== Biodiversity ==
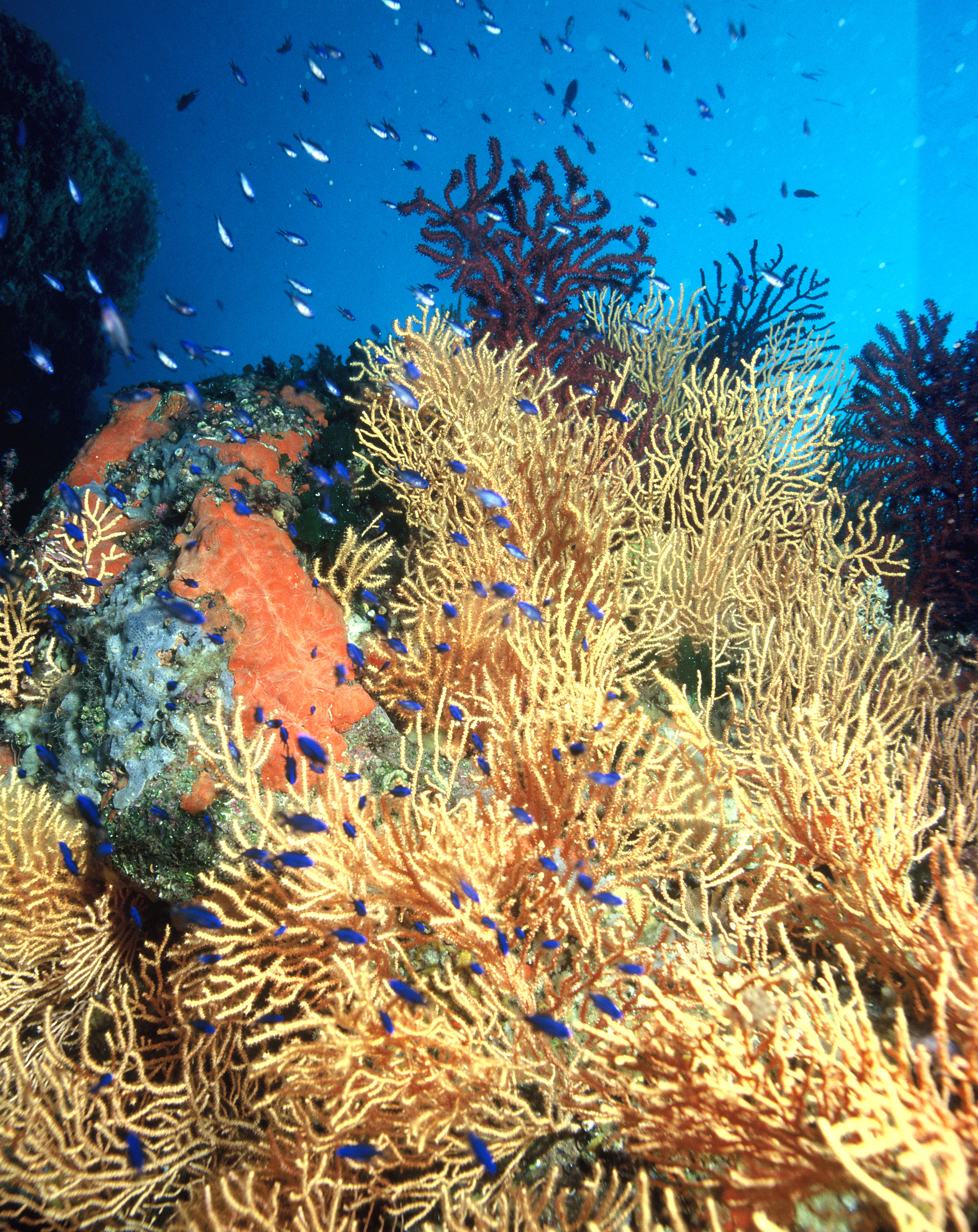
Soft coral Eunicella cavolini

Unlike the vast multidirectional ocean currents in open oceans within their respective oceanic zones; biodiversity in the Mediterranean Sea is stable due to the subtle but strong locked nature of currents which is favourable to life, even the smallest macroscopic type of volcanic life form. The stable marine ecosystem of the Mediterranean Sea and sea temperature provides a nourishing environment for life in the deep sea to flourish while assuring a balanced aquatic ecosystem excluded from any external deep oceanic factors. It is estimated that there are more than 17,000 marine species in the Mediterranean Sea with generally higher marine biodiversity in coastal areas, continental shelves, and decreases with depth.

As a result of the drying of the sea during the Messinian salinity crisis, the marine biota of the Mediterranean is derived primarily from the Atlantic Ocean. The North Atlantic is considerably colder and more nutrient-rich than the Mediterranean, and the marine life of the Mediterranean has had to adapt to its differing conditions in the five million years since the basin was reflooded later.

The Alboran Sea is a transition zone between the two seas, containing a mix of Mediterranean and Atlantic species. The Mediterranean monk seals live in the Aegean Sea in Greece.

There was a resident population of orcas in the Mediterranean until the 1980s, when they went extinct, probably due to long-term PCB exposure. There are still annual sightings of orca vagrants.

== Environmental issues ==
For 4,000 years, human activity has transformed most parts of Mediterranean Europe, and the "humanisation of the landscape" overlapped with the appearance of the present Mediterranean climate. The image of a simplistic, environmental determinist notion of a Mediterranean paradise on Earth in antiquity, which was destroyed by later civilisations, dates back to at least the 18th century and was for centuries fashionable in archaeological and historical circles. Based on a broad variety of methods, e.g. historical documents, analysis of trade relations, floodplain sediments, pollen, tree-ring and further archaeometric analyses and population studies, Alfred Thomas Grove's and Oliver Rackham's work on "The Nature of Mediterranean Europe" challenges this common wisdom of a Mediterranean Europe as a "Lost Eden", a formerly fertile and forested region, that had been progressively degraded and desertified by human mismanagement. The belief stems more from the failure of the recent landscape to measure up to the imaginary past of the classics as idealised by artists, poets and scientists of the early modern Enlightenment.

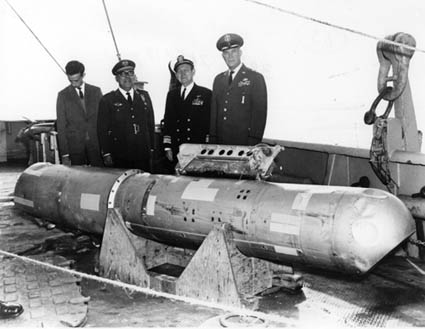
The thermonuclear bomb that fell into the sea recovered off Palomares, Almería, 1966

The historical evolution of climate, vegetation and landscape in southern Europe from prehistoric times to the present is much more complex and underwent various changes. For example, some of the deforestation had already taken place before the Roman age. While in the Roman age large enterprises such as the latifundia took effective care of forests and agriculture, the largest depopulation effects came with the end of the empire. The major deforestation might have taken place in modern times—the later usage patterns were also quite different e.g. in southern and northern Italy. Also, the climate has usually been unstable and there is evidence of various ancient and modern "Little Ice Ages", and plant cover accommodated to various extremes and became resilient to various patterns of human activity.

Even Grove considered that human activity could be the cause of climate change. Modern science has been able to provide clear evidence of this. The wide ecological diversity typical of Mediterranean Europe is predominantly based on human behaviour, as it is and has been closely related to human usage patterns. The diversity range was enhanced by the widespread exchange and interaction of the longstanding and highly diverse local agriculture, intense transport and trade relations, and the interaction with settlements, pasture and other land use. The greatest human-induced changes, however, came after World War II, in line with the "1950s syndrome" as rural populations throughout the region abandoned traditional subsistence economies. Grove and Rackham suggest that the locals left the traditional agricultural patterns and instead became scenery-setting agents for tourism. This resulted in more uniform, large-scale formations. Among further current important threats to Mediterranean landscapes are overdevelopment of coastal areas, abandonment of mountains and, as mentioned, the loss of variety via the reduction of traditional agricultural occupations.

=== Natural hazards ===
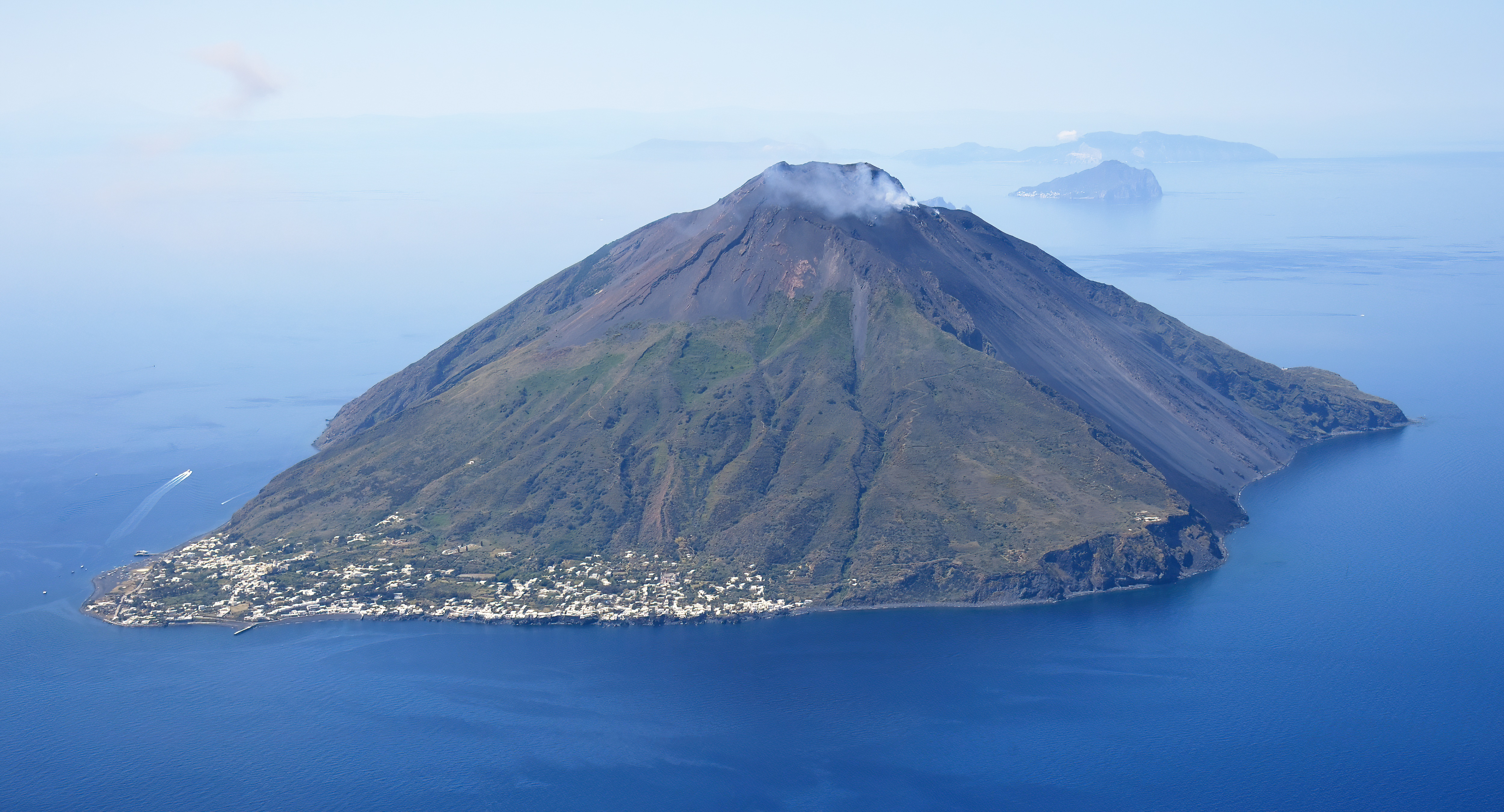
Stromboli volcano in Italy

The Mediterranean region is one of the most geologically active maritime areas of the globe, sitting on a complex tectonic boundary zone between the European and African plates. The geology of the region, with the presence of plate boundaries and active faults, makes it prone to quite frequent earthquakes, tsunamis and submarine landslides with can have devastating consequences in densely populated coastal areas. In addition climate change now intensifies the frequency and impacts of storm surges and coastal flooding, putting additional human lives and property at risk.

Earthquakes are relatively frequent in the Mediterranean Basin, starting in the Mediterranean 70 million years ago. They are still ongoing. From the boundary of tectonic plates, the Mediterranean territory is called two distinct parts: the Eastern Mediterranean (from Italy to Turkey), which is characterised by intense seismicity with earthquakes whose magnitude can rise to 7.5 Richter with more than 350 recorded tsunamis, and the Western Mediterranean. During the 20th century, 198,548 earthquake victims were recorded.

Volcanic eruptions are not uncommon either and left their mark in historical and archaeological records. The largest include the Thera eruption, dated around 1600 BC, and the eruptions of Mount Vesuvius in 217 BC and AD 79 - the latter famously known for the destruction and the burying of the ancient cities of Pompeii and Herculaneum. In the same region the Phlegraean Fields west of Naples constitute one of the most significant volcanic systems in the world, still very active. In the same general area, volcanoes like Mt. Etna and Stromboli are considered in a state of permanent activity, with frequent eruptions and lava emissions through the past 1500 years.

Tsunamis, usually triggered by earthquakes, volcanic eruptions and submarine landslides, have caused a number of documented disasters in the Mediterranean Basin in the past 2500 years. Historical examples include the 365 and 1303 tsunamis in the Hellenic Arc, more recently the disastrous 1908 event that destroyed the cities of Messina and Reggio Calabria, and the large tsunami that occurred off the Algerian margin in 2003.

On the diplomatic front, the experience of coastal countries and regional authorities is leading to exchange at the international level with the cooperation of NGOs, states, regional and municipal authorities. The Greek–Turkish earthquake diplomacy is a quite positive example of natural hazards leading to improved relations between traditional rivals in the region after earthquakes in İzmit and Athens in 1999. The European Union Solidarity Fund (EUSF) was set up to respond to major natural disasters and express European solidarity to disaster-stricken regions within all of Europe. The largest amount of funding requests in the EU relates to forest fires, followed by floods and earthquakes. Forest fires, whether human-made or natural, are a frequent and dangerous hazard in the Mediterranean region. Tsunamis are also an often-underestimated hazard in the region. For example, the 1908 Messina earthquake and tsunami took more than 123,000 lives in Sicily and Calabria and were among the deadliest natural disasters in modern Europe.

=== Invasive species ===
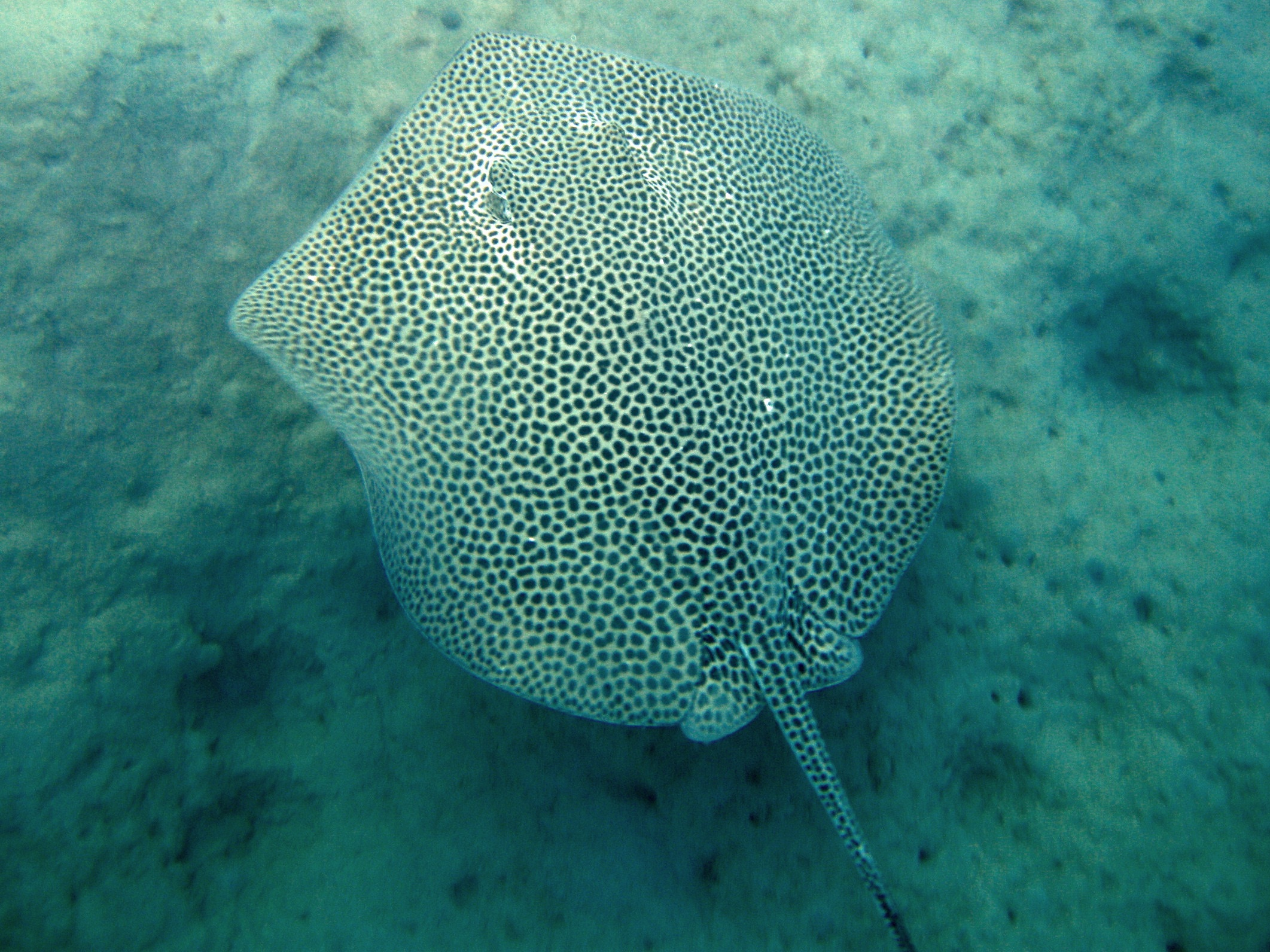
The reticulate whipray is one of the species that colonised the Eastern Mediterranean through the Suez Canal as part of the ongoing Lessepsian migration.

Invasive species have become a major component of the Mediterranean ecosystem and have serious impacts on the Mediterranean ecology, endangering a number of local and endemic Mediterranean species. A first look at some groups of marine species shows that over 70% of exotic decapods and some 2/3 of exotic fishes found in the Mediterranean are of Indo-Pacific origin, introduced from the Red Sea via the Suez Canal. This makes the Canal the first pathway of arrival of alien species into the Mediterranean. The impacts of some Lessepsian species have proven to be considerable, mainly in the Levantine basin of the Mediterranean, where they are replacing native species and becoming a familiar sight.

According to definitions by the Mediterranean Science Commission and the International Union for Conservation of Nature, and to Convention on Biological Diversity (CBD) and Ramsar Convention terminologies, they are alien species, as they are non-native (non-indigenous) to the Mediterranean Sea, and are found outside their normal, non-adjacent area of distribution. When these species succeed in establishing populations in the Mediterranean Sea, compete with and begin to replace native species they are "Alien Invasive Species", as they are an agent of change and a threat to the native biodiversity. In the context of CBD, "introduction" refers to the movement by human agency, indirect or direct, of an alien species outside of its natural range (past or present). The Suez Canal, being an artificial (human-made) canal, is a human agency. Lessepsian migrants are therefore "introduced" species (indirect, and unintentional). Whatever wording is chosen, they represent a threat to the native Mediterranean biodiversity, because they are non-indigenous to this sea. In recent years, the Egyptian government's announcement of its intentions to deepen and widen the Canal raised concerns from marine biologists, fearing that such an act will only worsen the invasion of Red Sea species into the Mediterranean, and lead to even more species passing through the Canal.

==== Arrival of new tropical Atlantic species ====
In recent decades, the arrival of exotic species from the tropical Atlantic has become noticeable. In many cases this reflects an expansion – favoured by a warming trend of sub-tropical Atlantic waters, and also by a fast-growing maritime traffic – of the natural range of species that now enter the Mediterranean through the Strait of Gibraltar. While not as intense as Lessepsian migration, the process is of importance and is therefore receiving increased levels of scientific coverage.

=== Sea-level rise ===
By 2100 the overall level of the Mediterranean could rise between 3 and 61 cm (1.2 and 24.0 in) as a result of the effects of climate change. This could have adverse effects on populations across the Mediterranean:

- Rising sea levels will submerge parts of Malta. Rising sea levels will also mean rising salt water levels in Malta's groundwater supply and reduce the availability of drinking water.
- A 30 cm (12 in) rise in sea level would flood 200 square kilometres (77 sq mi) of the Nile Delta, displacing over 500,000 Egyptians.
- Cyprus wetlands are also in danger of being destroyed by the rising temperatures and sea levels.

Coastal ecosystems also appear to be threatened by sea level rise, especially enclosed seas such as the Baltic, the Mediterranean and the Black Sea. These seas have only small and primarily east–west movement corridors, which may restrict northward displacement of organisms in these areas. Sea level rise for the next century (2100) could be between 30 and 100 cm (12 and 39 in) and temperature shifts of a mere 0.05–0.1 °C (0.09–0.18 °F) in the deep sea are sufficient to induce significant changes in species richness and functional diversity.

=== Pollution ===
Pollution in this region has been extremely high in recent years. The United Nations Environment Programme has estimated that 650,000,000 t (720,000,000 short tons) of sewage, 129,000 t (142,000 short tons) of mineral oil, 60,000 t (66,000 short tons) of mercury, 3,800 t (4,200 short tons) of lead and 36,000 t (40,000 short tons) of phosphates are dumped into the Mediterranean each year. The Barcelona Convention aims to 'reduce pollution in the Mediterranean Sea and protect and improve the marine environment in the area, thereby contributing to its sustainable development.'

Many marine species have been almost wiped out because of the sea's pollution. One of them is the Mediterranean monk seal which is considered to be among the world's most endangered marine mammals.

The Mediterranean is also plagued by marine debris. A 1994 study of the seabed using trawl nets around the coasts of Spain, France and Italy reported a particularly high mean concentration of debris; an average of 1,935 items per km^{2} (5,010/sq mi).

=== Shipping ===
Largest ports of the Mediterranean area per total vessel traffic as of 2016.

Approximately 370,000,000 t (360,000,000 long tons) of oil are transported annually in the Mediterranean Sea (more than 20% of the world total), with around 250–300 oil tankers crossing the sea every day. An important destination is the Port of Trieste, the starting point of the Transalpine Pipeline, which covers 40% of Germany's oil demand (100% of the federal states of Bavaria and Baden-Württemberg), 90% of Austria and 50% of the Czech Republic. Accidental oil spills happen frequently with an average of 10 spills per year. A major oil spill could occur at any time in any part of the Mediterranean.

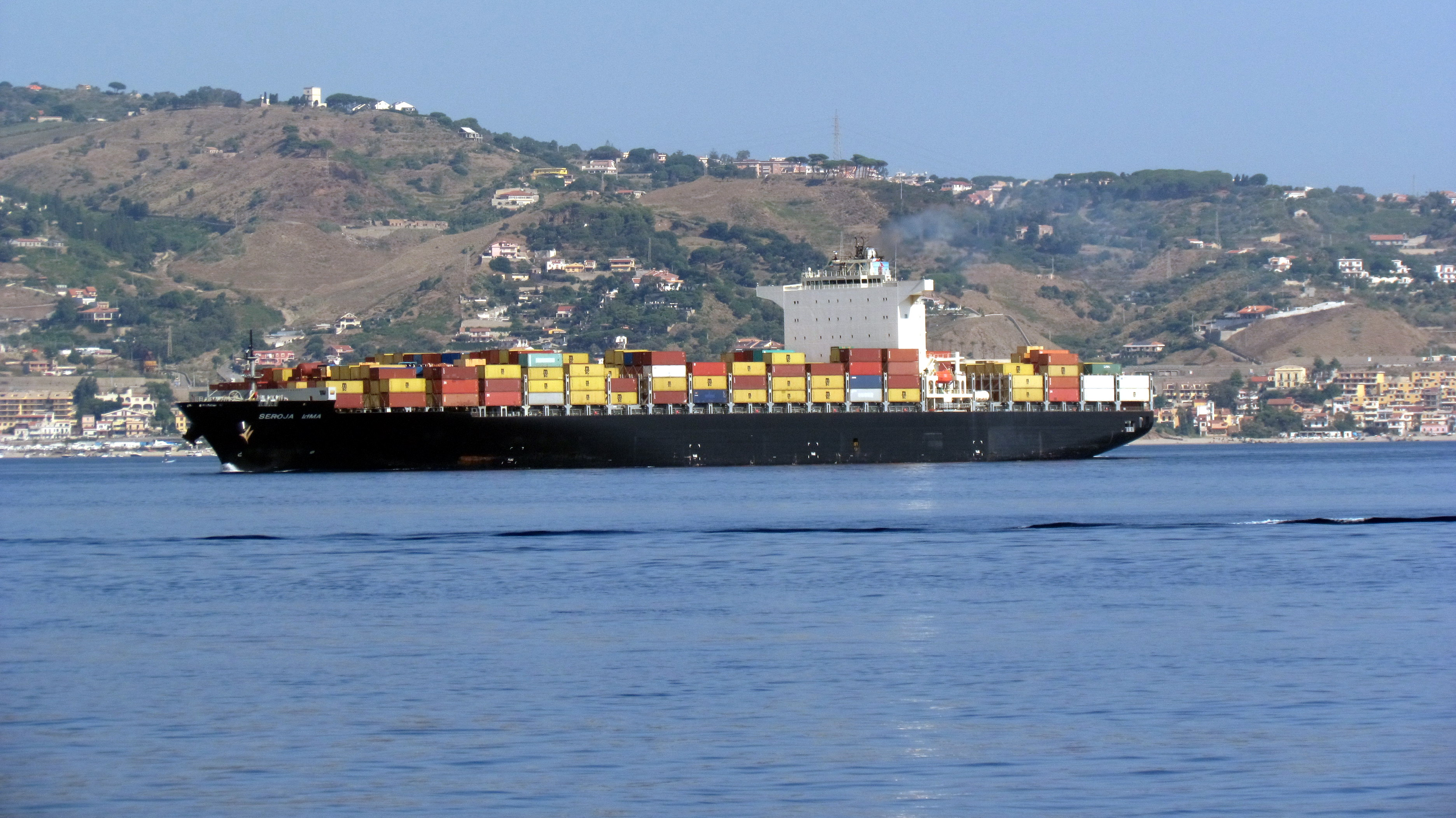
A cargo ship cruises towards the Strait of Messina

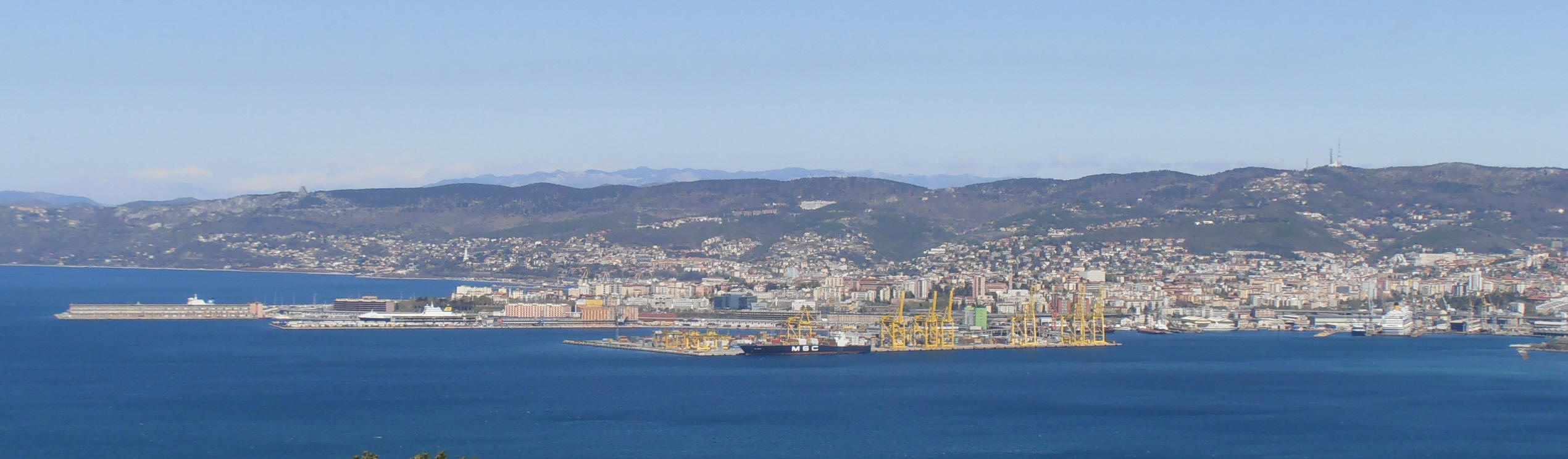
Port of Trieste

=== Tourism ===
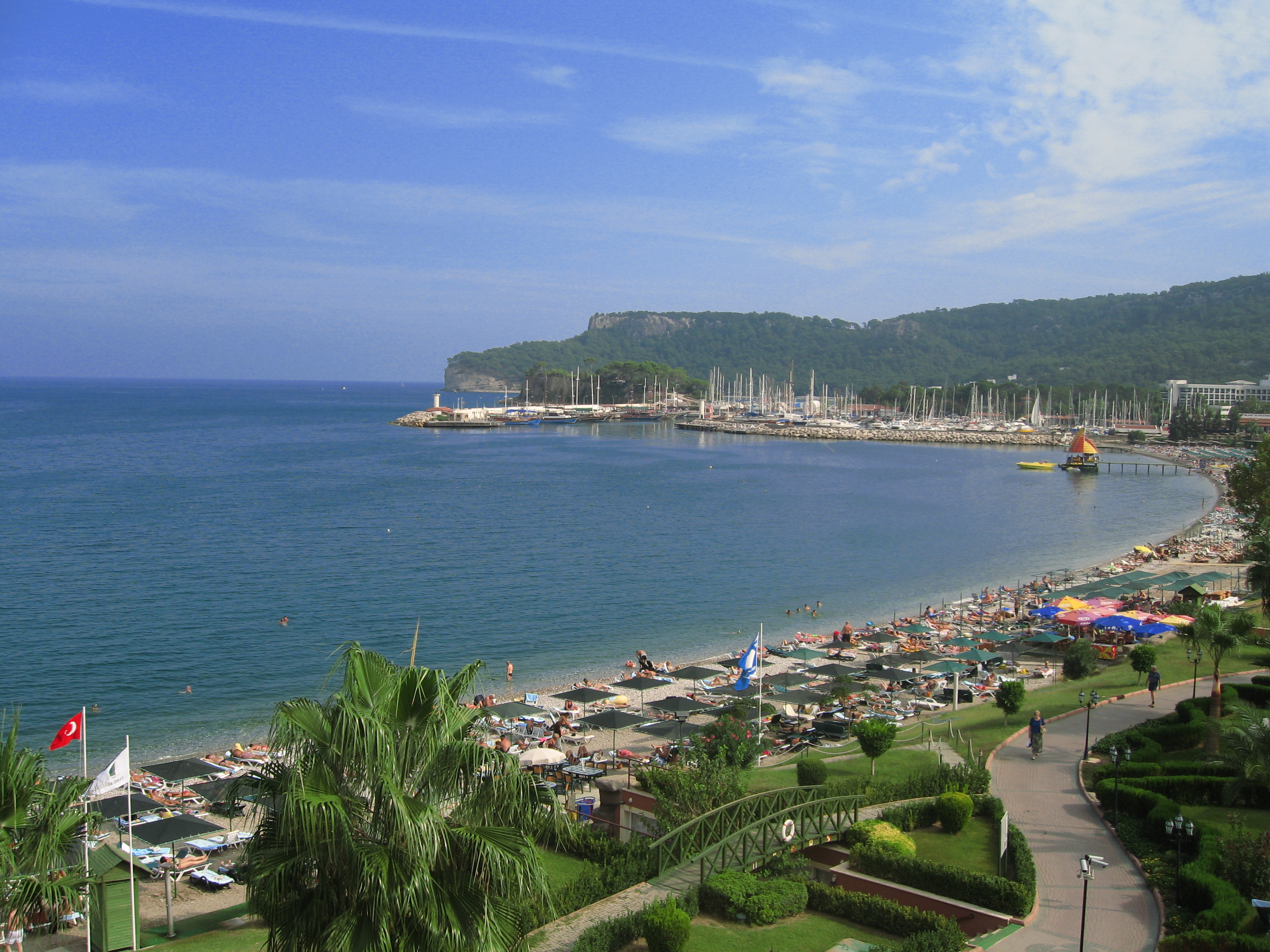
Kemer Beach in Antalya on the Turkish Riviera (Turquoise Coast). In 2019, Turkey ranked sixth in the world in terms of the number of international tourist arrivals, with 51.2 million foreign tourists visiting the country.

The coast of the Mediterranean has been used for tourism since ancient times, as the Roman villa buildings on the Amalfi Coast or in Barcola show. From the end of the 19th century, in particular, the beaches became places of longing for many Europeans and travellers. From then on, and especially after World War II, mass tourism to the Mediterranean began with all its advantages and disadvantages. While initially, the journey was by train and later by bus or car, today the plane is increasingly used.

Tourism is a significant source of income for several Mediterranean countries, including small coastal communities and islands independent of urban centres, despite geopolitical conflicts in the region. However, tourism has also played a major role in the degradation of the coastal and marine environment. Rapid development has been encouraged by Mediterranean governments to support the large numbers of tourists visiting the region, but this has caused serious disturbance to marine habitats by erosion and pollution in many places along the Mediterranean coasts.

Tourism often concentrates in areas of high natural wealth, causing a serious threat to the habitats of endangered species such as sea turtles and monk seals. Reductions in natural wealth may reduce the incentive for tourists to visit.

=== Overfishing ===
Fish stock levels in the Mediterranean Sea are alarmingly low. The European Environment Agency says that more than 65% of all fish stocks in the region are outside safe biological limits. Some of the most important fisheries are threatened. There are clear indications that catch size and quality have declined, often dramatically, and in many areas, larger and longer-lived species have disappeared entirely from commercial catches.

=== Marine heatwaves ===
A study showed that climate change-related exceptional marine heatwaves in the Mediterranean Sea during 2015–2019 resulted in widespread mass sealife die-offs in five consecutive years.

== Gallery ==
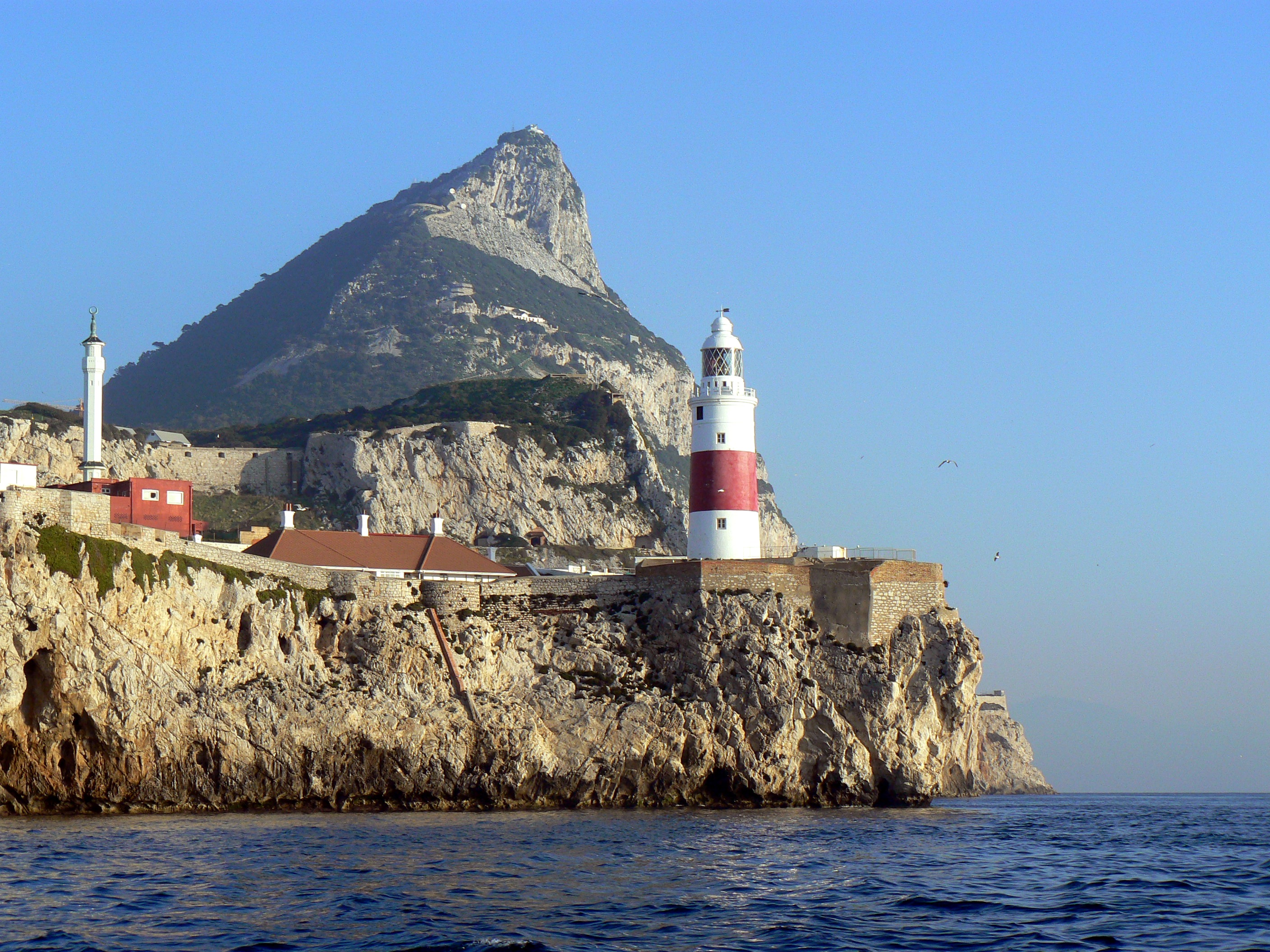
Europa Point, Gibraltar

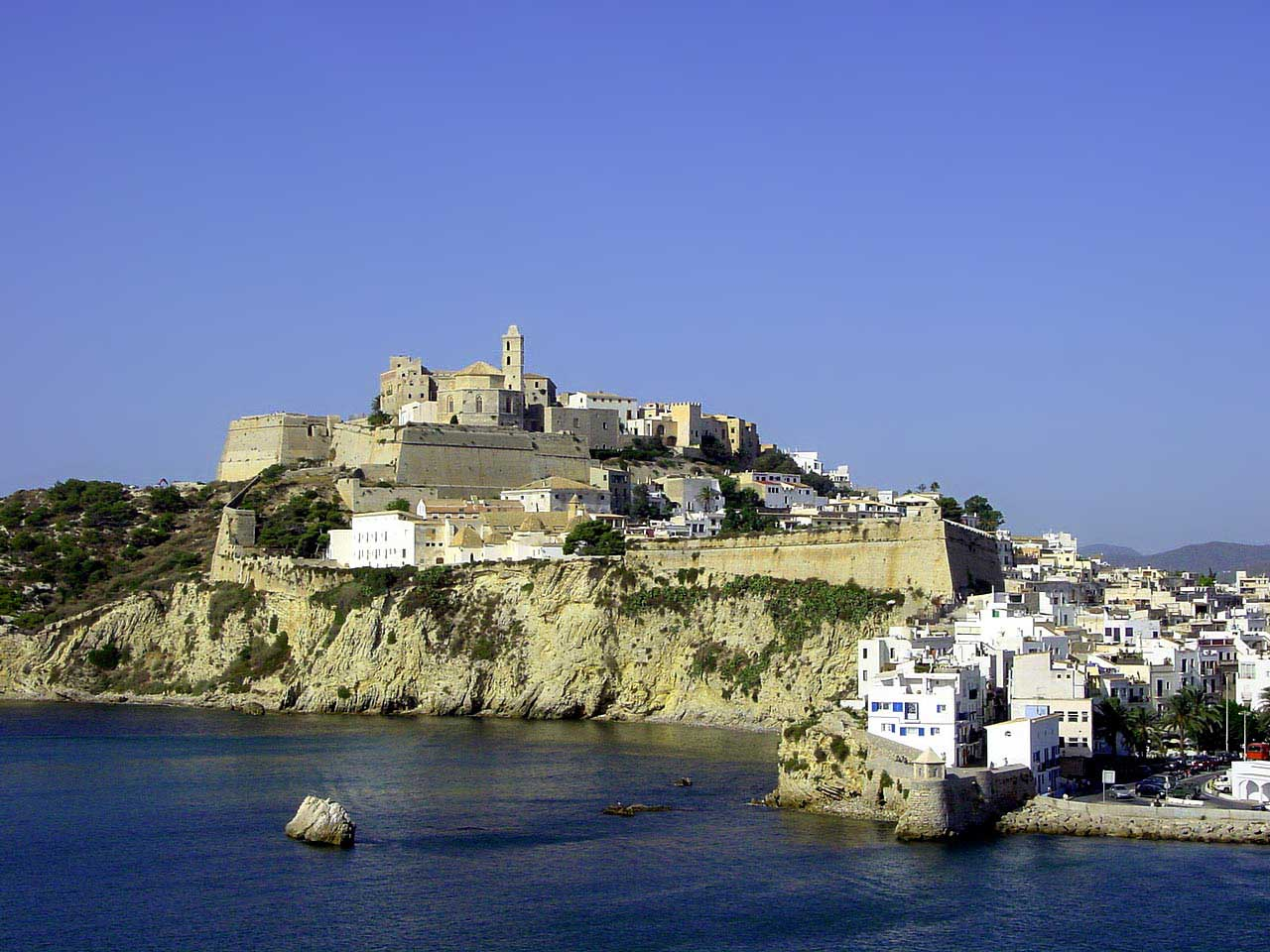
Old city of Ibiza Town, Spain

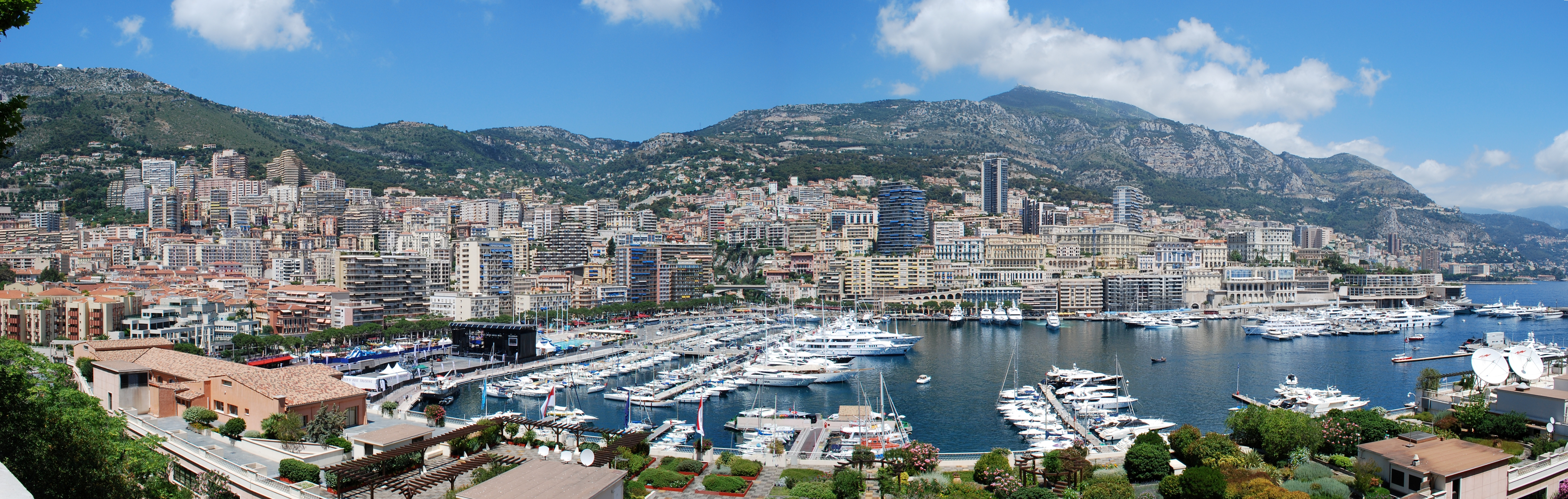
Panoramic view of La Condamine, Monaco

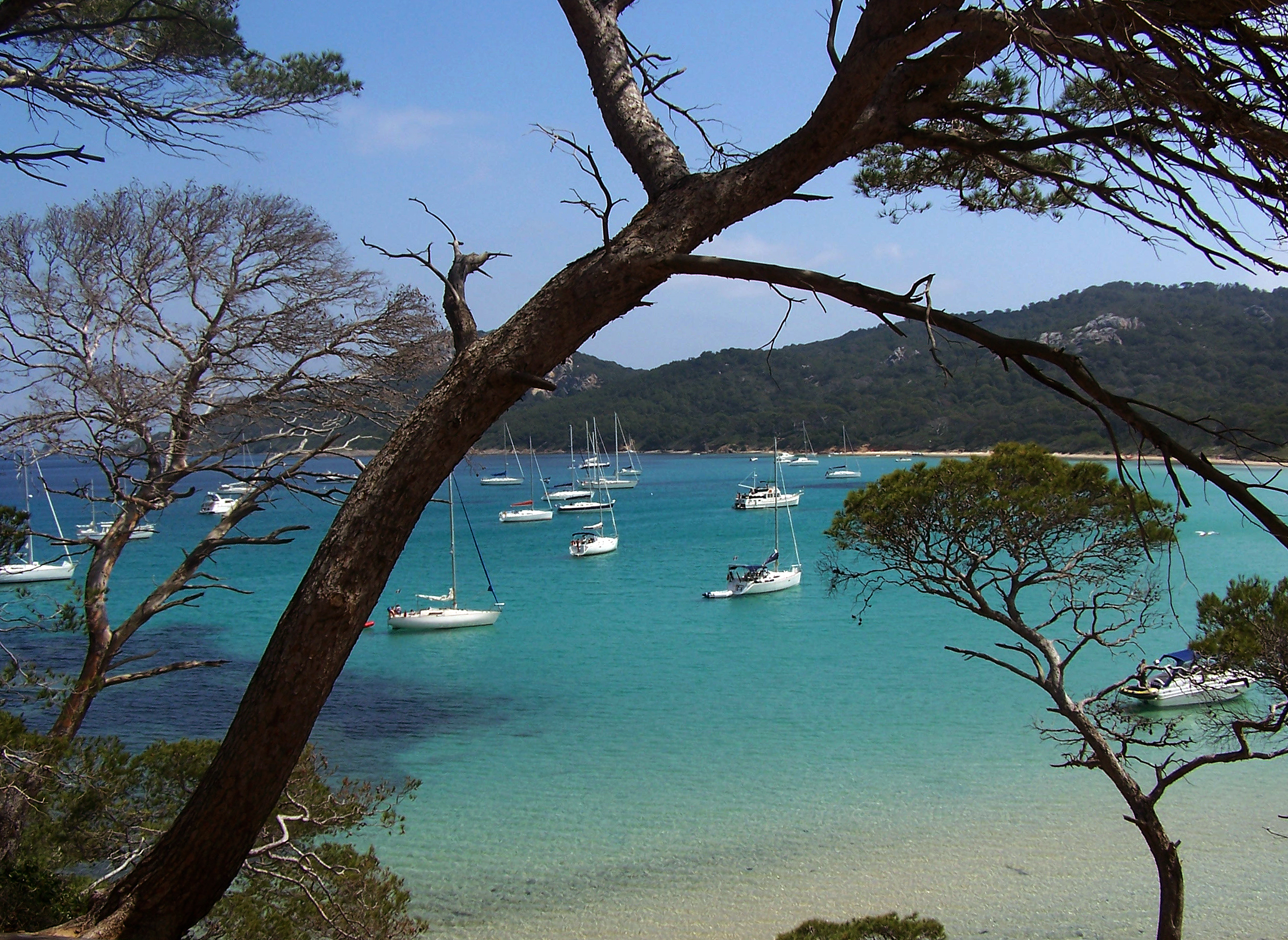
The beach of la Courtade in the Îles d'Hyères, France

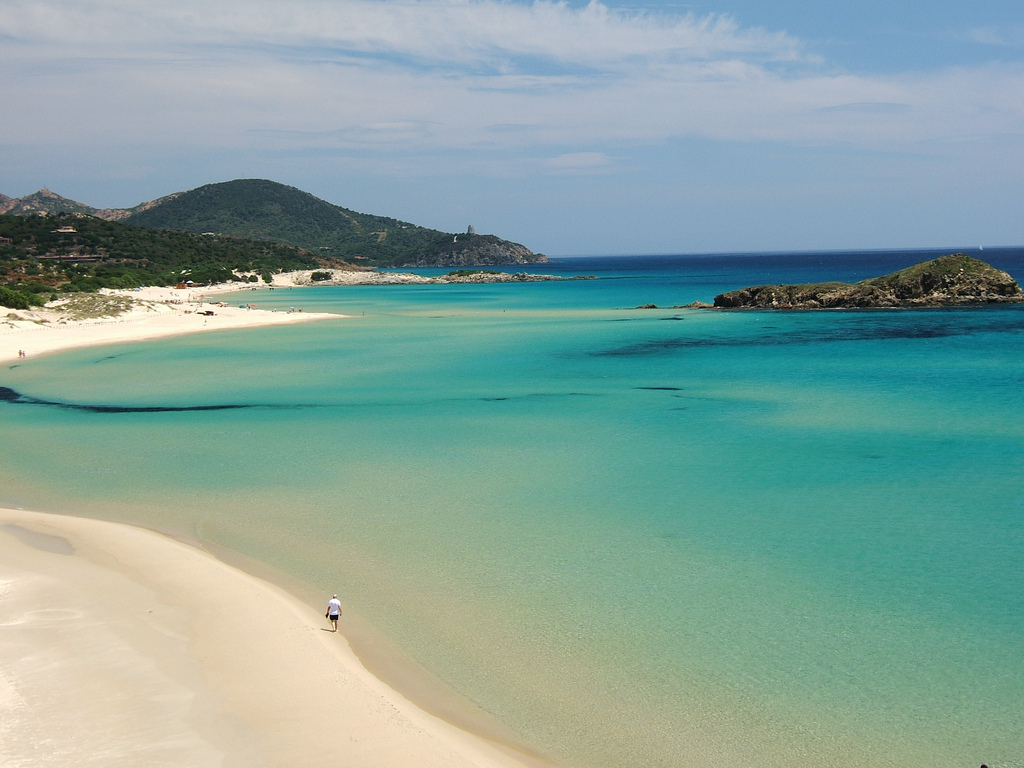
Sardinia's south coast, Italy

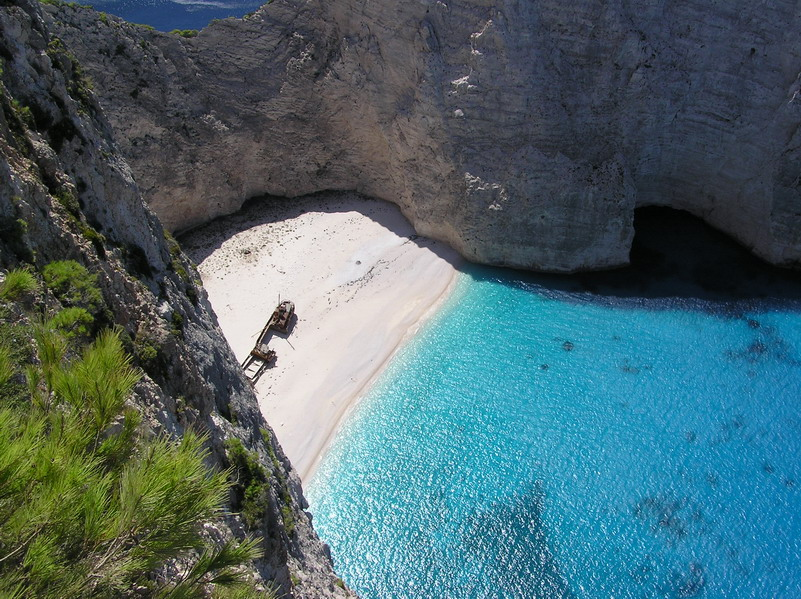
Navagio, Greece

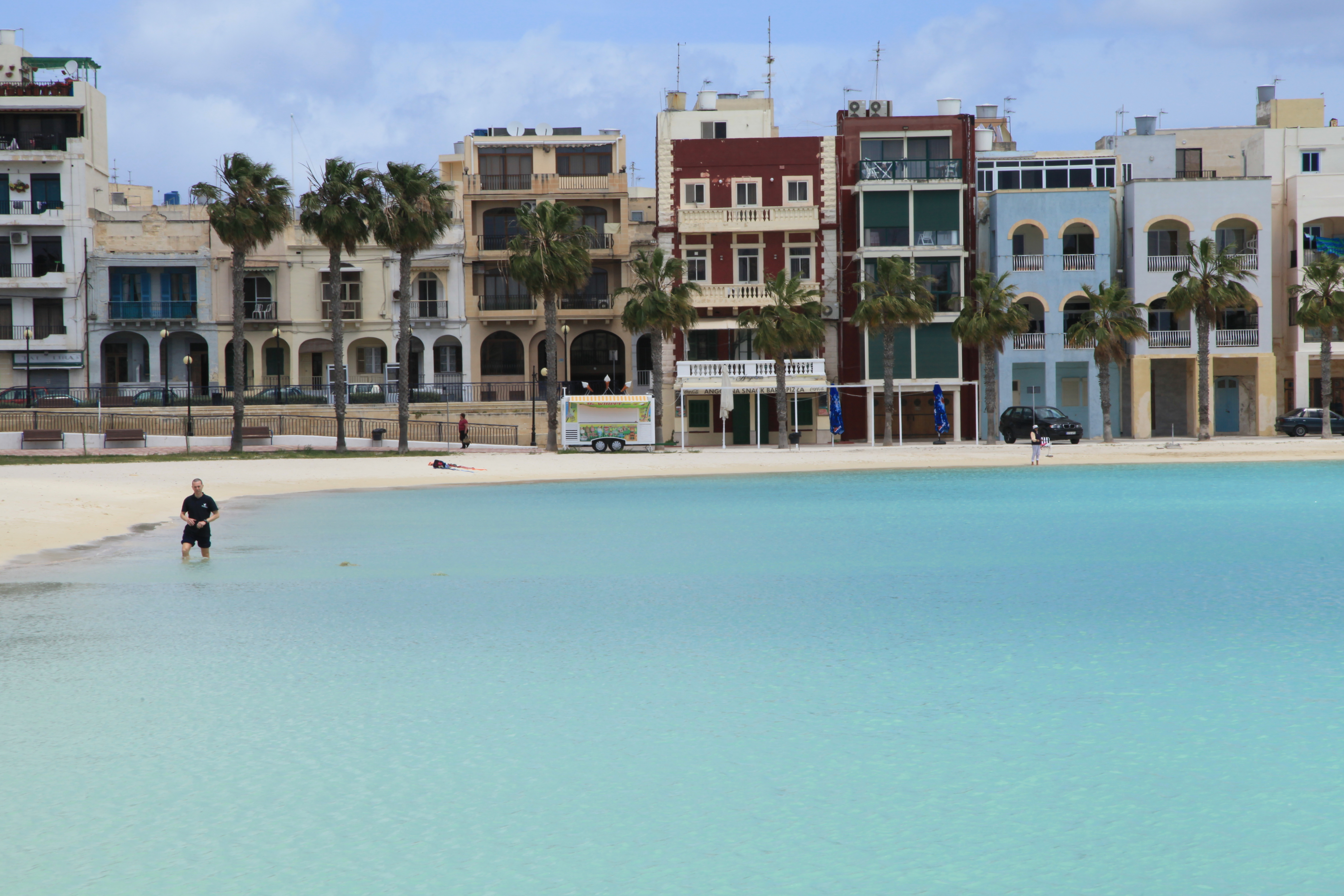
Pretty Bay in Birżebbuġa, Malta

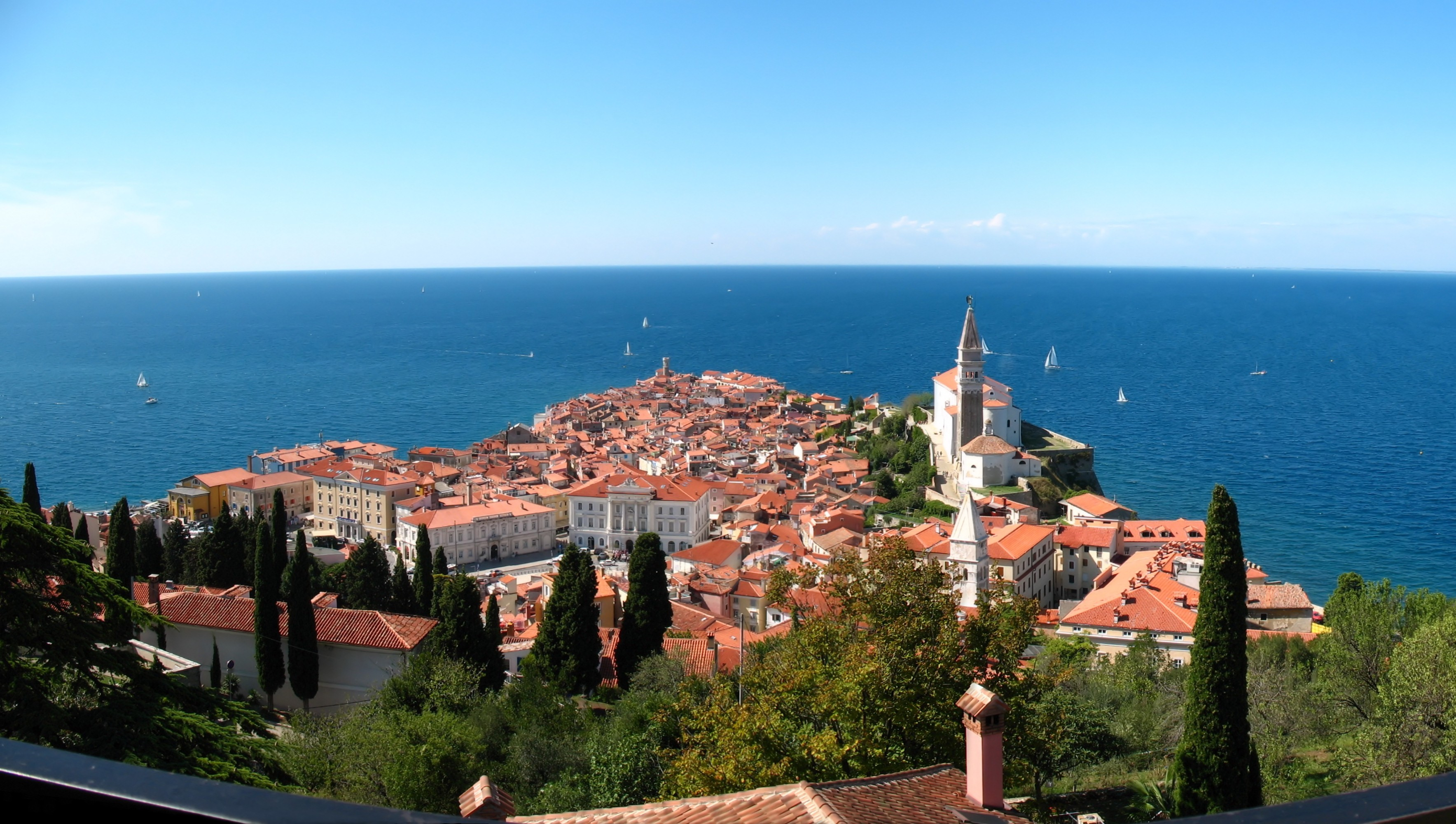
Panoramic view of Piran, Slovenia

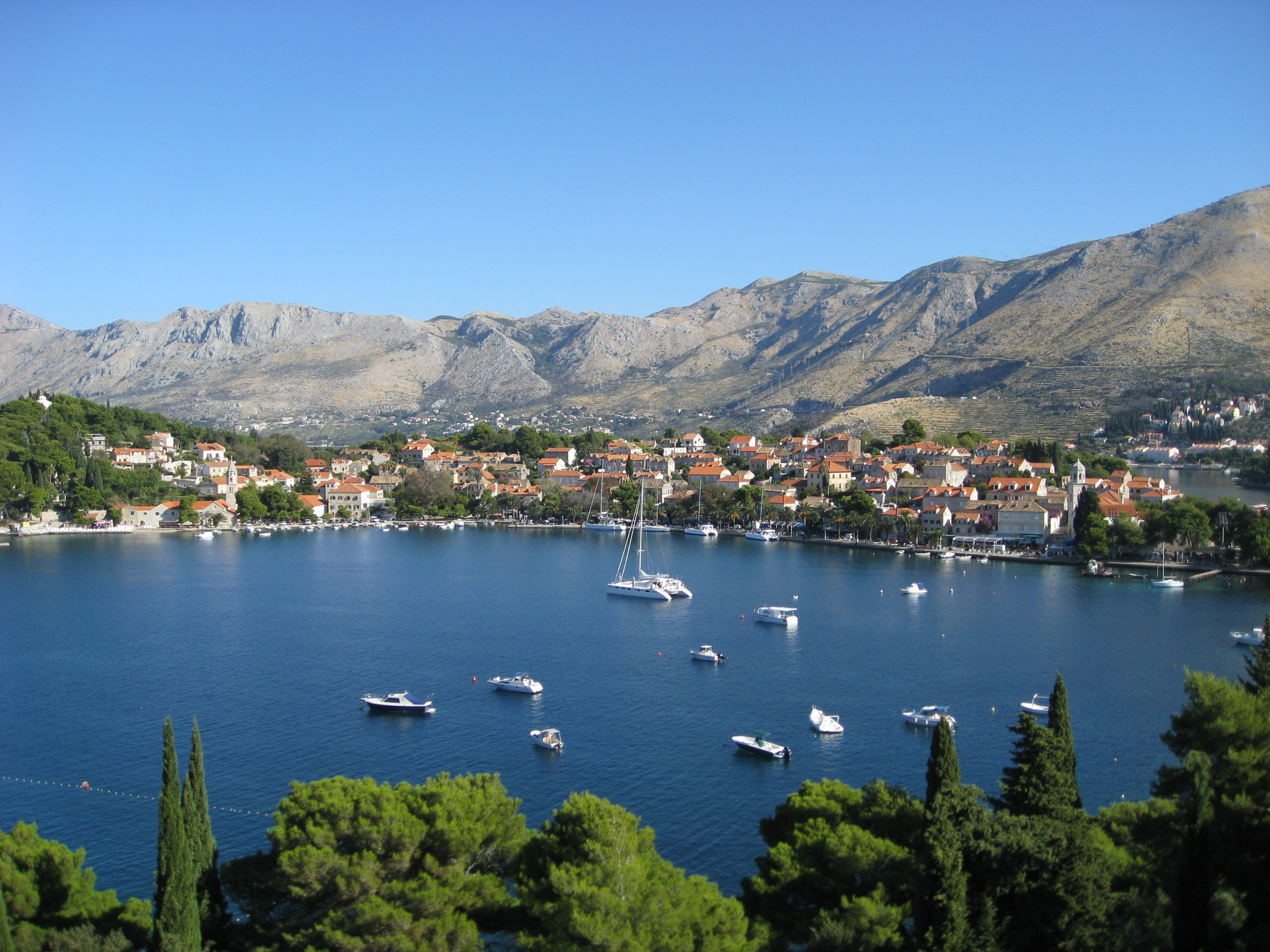
Panoramic view of Cavtat, Croatia

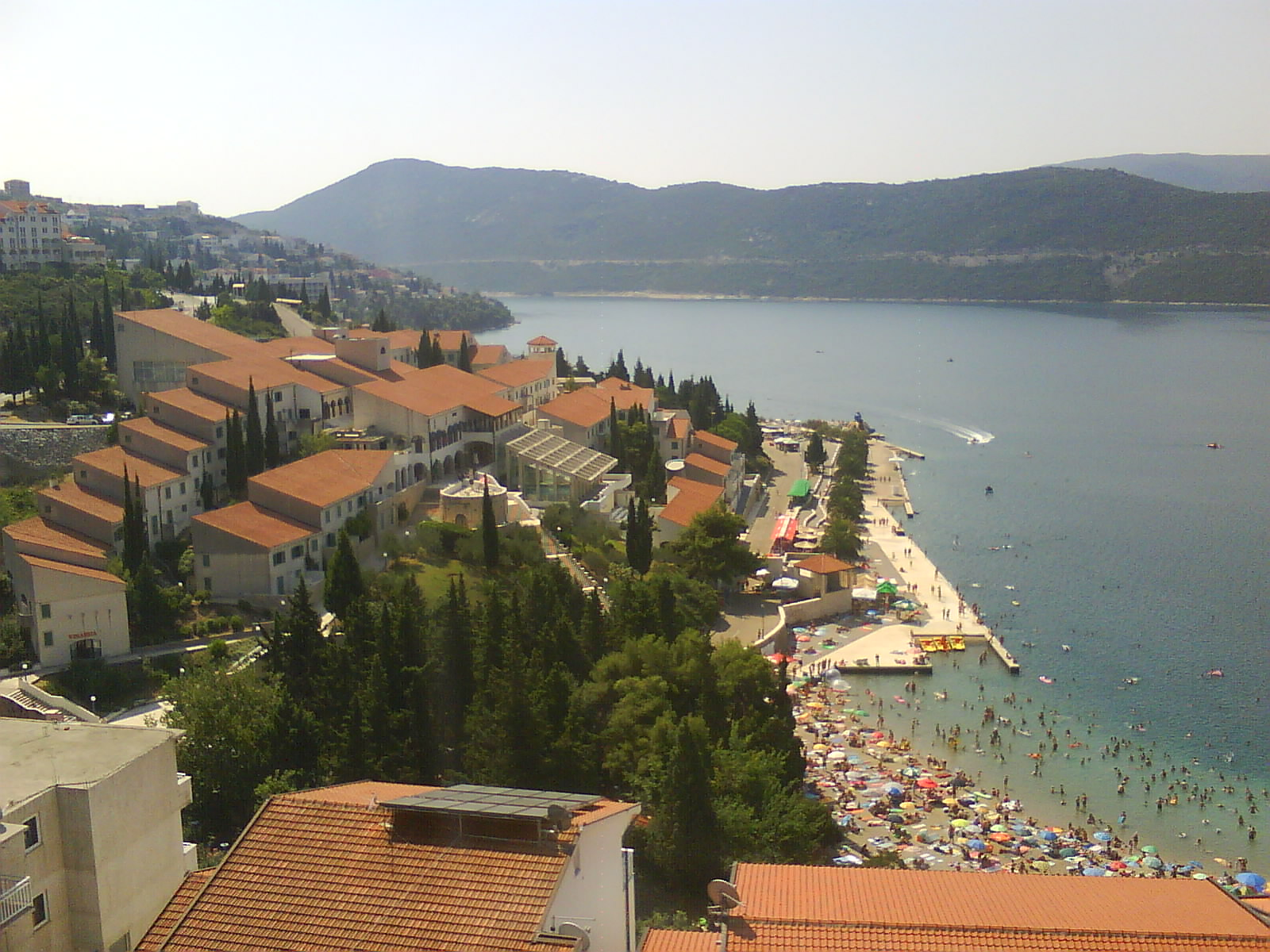
View of Neum, Bosnia and Herzegovina

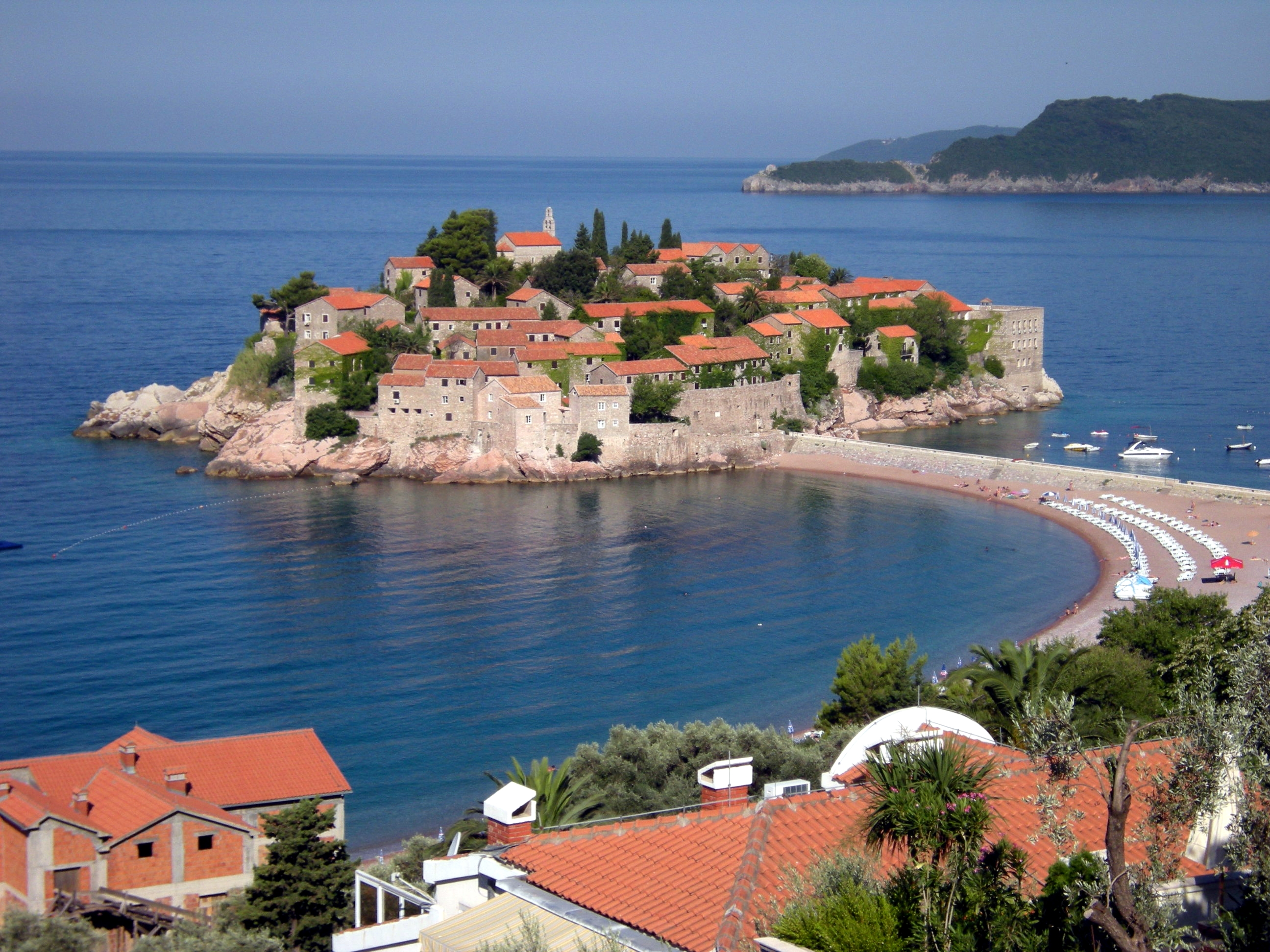
A view of Sveti Stefan, Montenegro

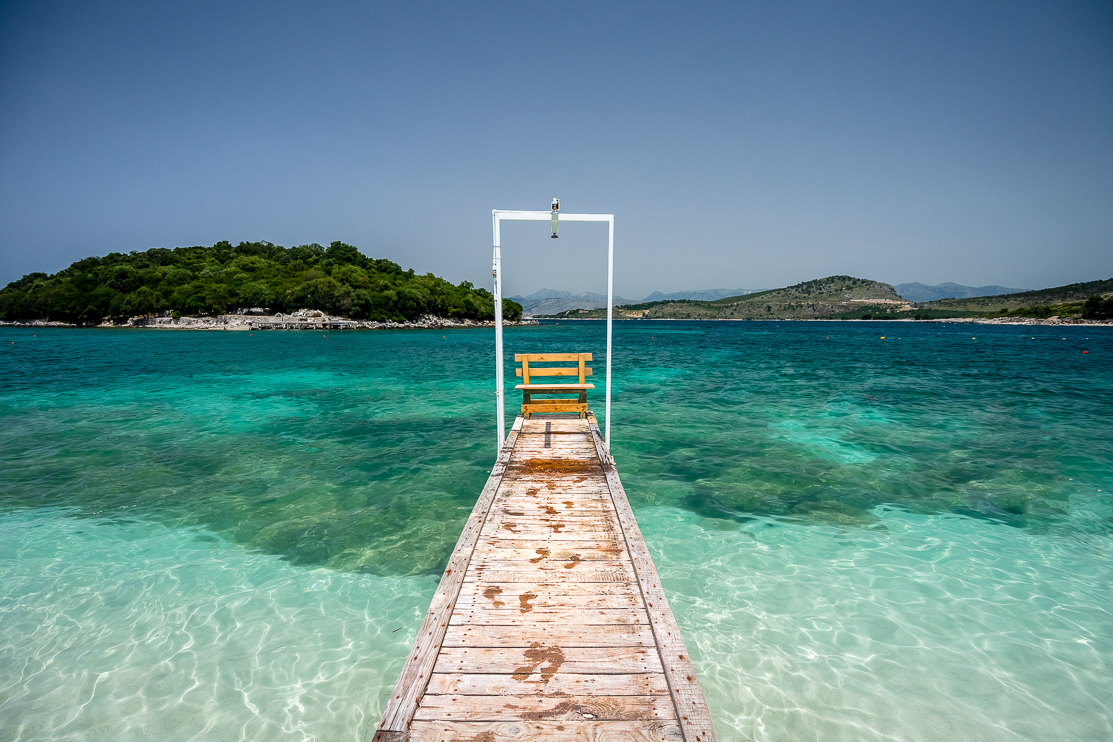
Ksamil Islands, Albania

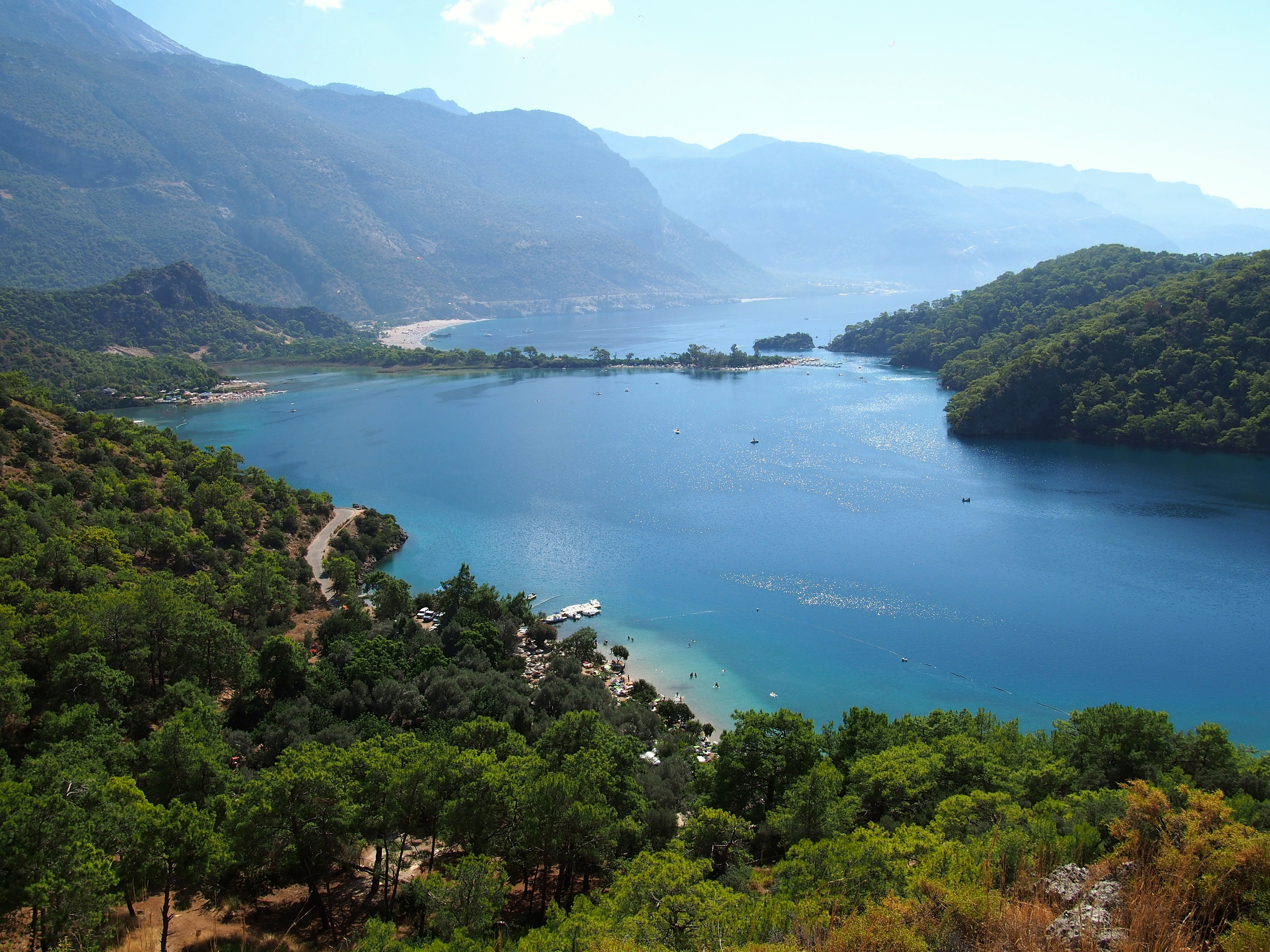
Ölüdeniz, Turquoise Coast, Turkey

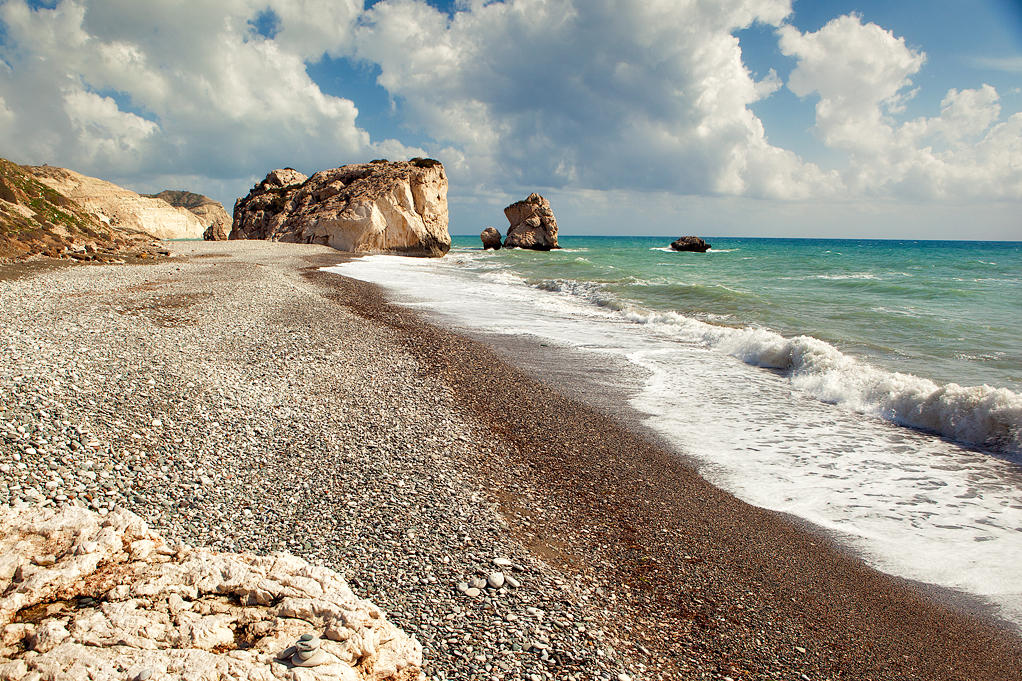
Paphos, Cyprus

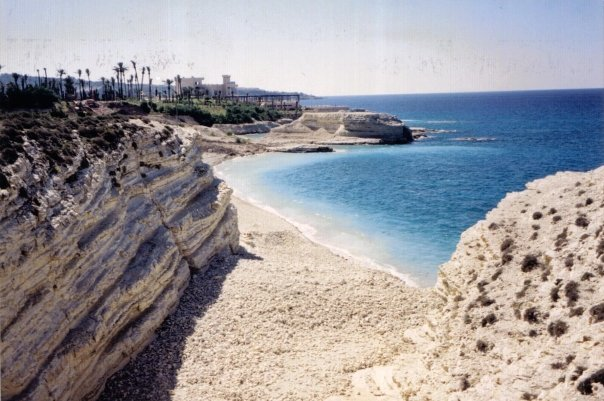
Burj Islam Beach, Latakia, Syria

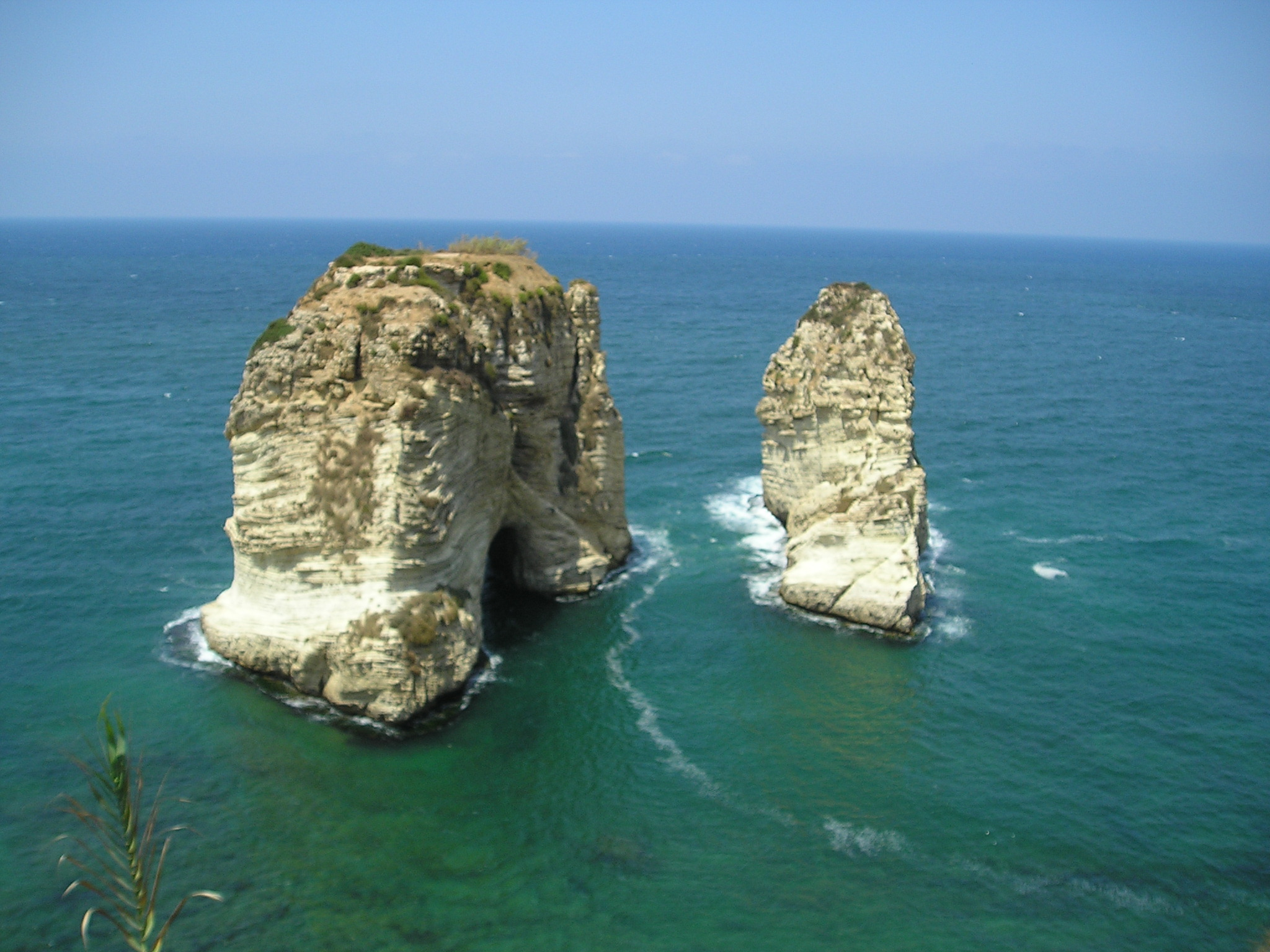
A view of Raouché off the coast of Beirut, Lebanon

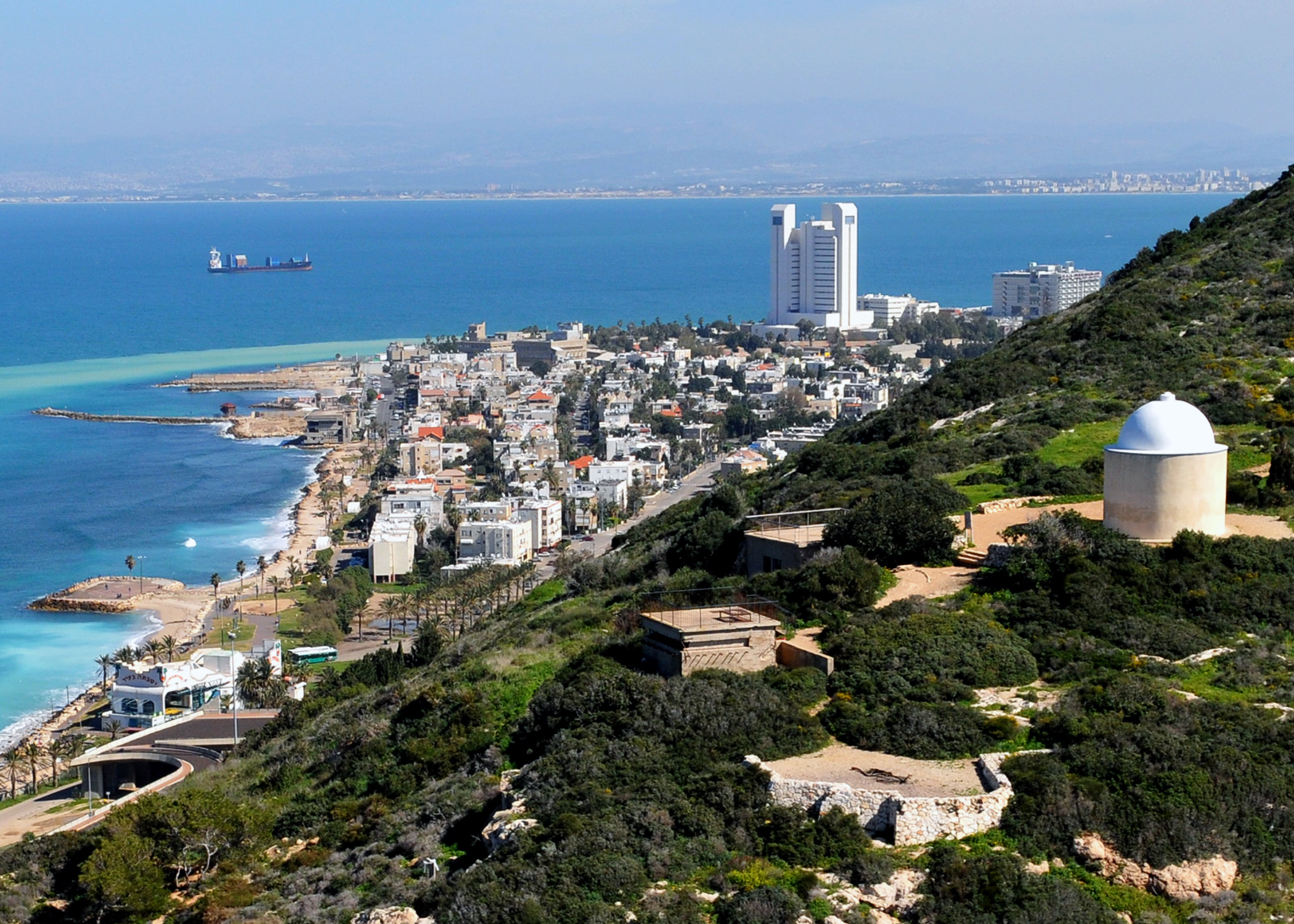
A view of Haifa, Israel

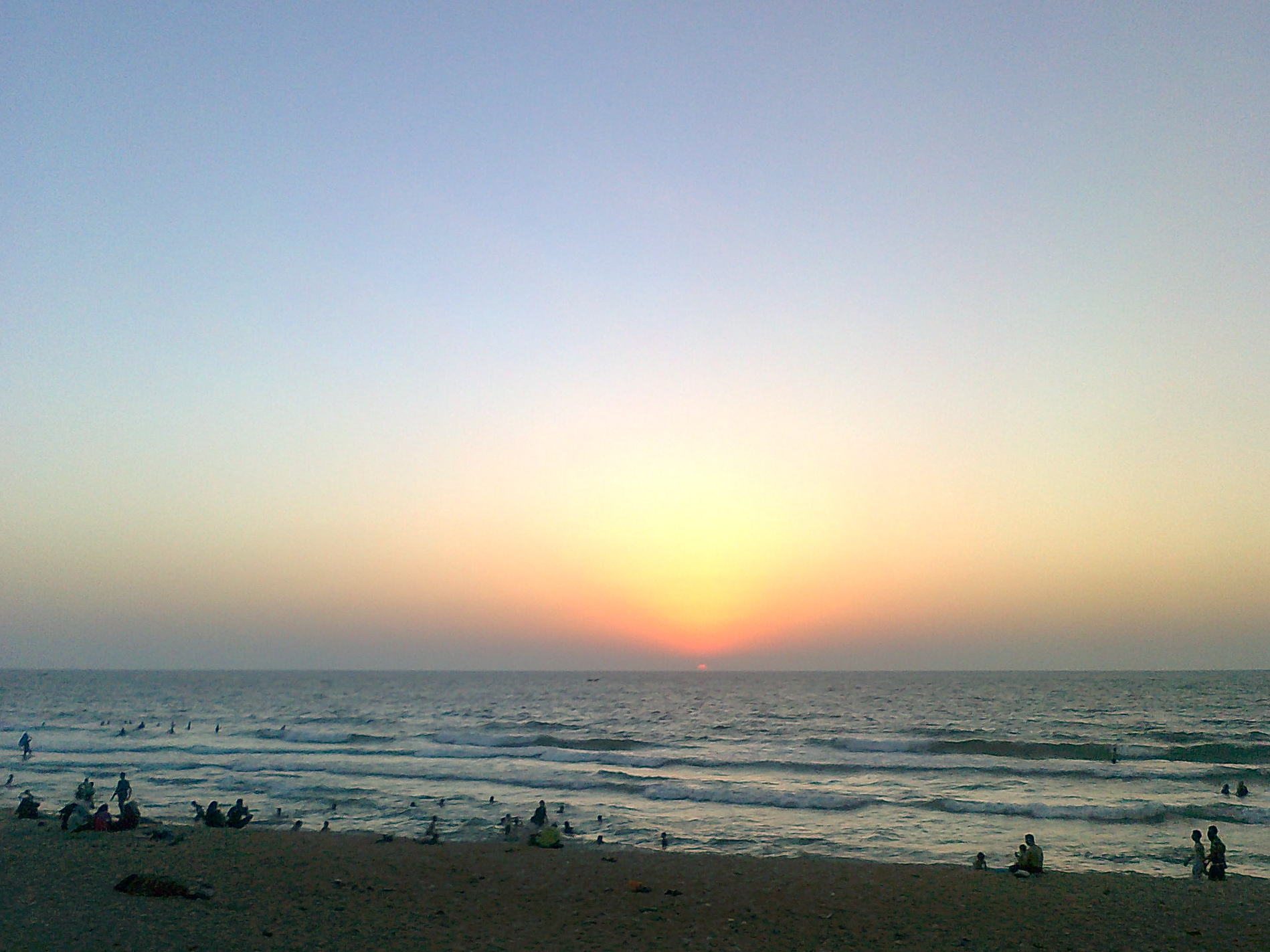
Sunset at the Deir al-Balah beach, Gaza Strip, Palestine

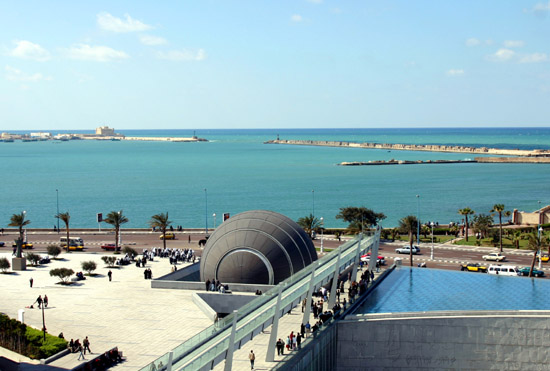
Coast of Alexandria, view From Bibliotheca Alexandrina, Egypt

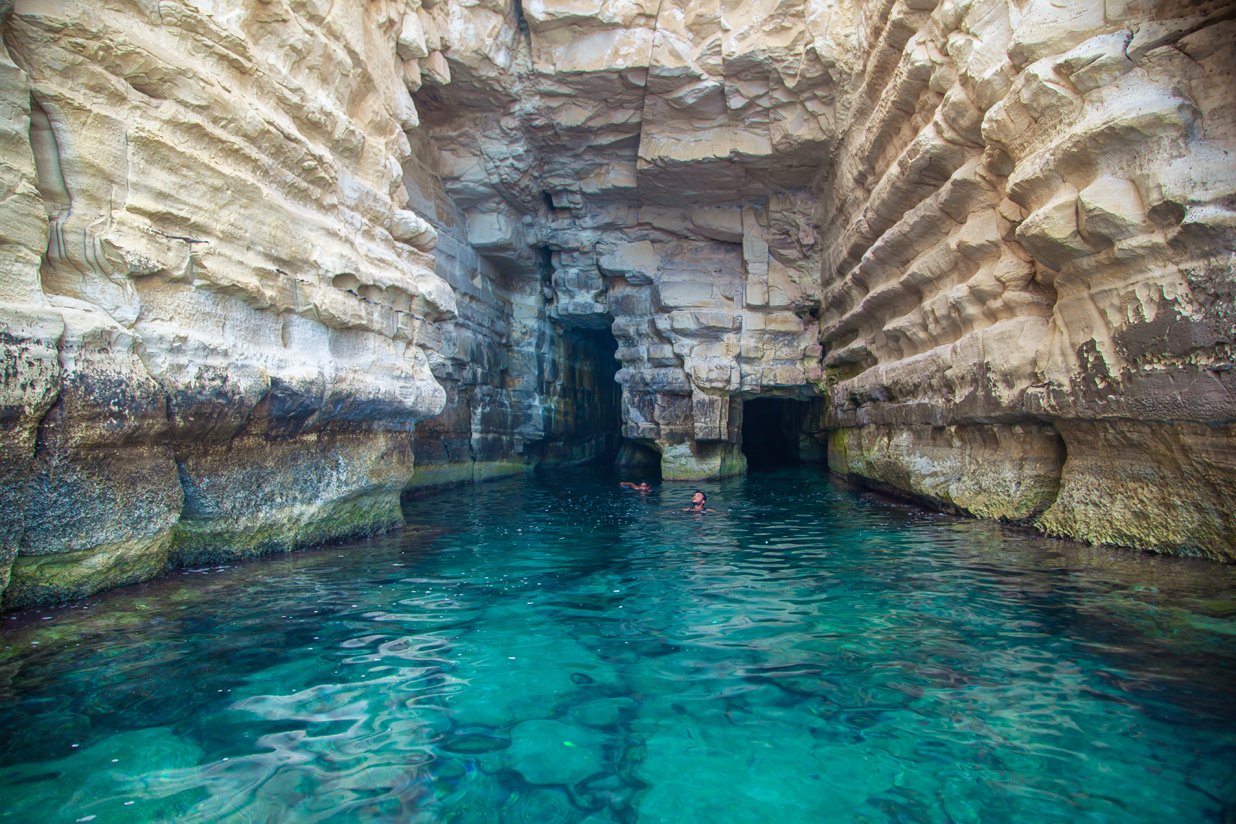
Ras El Hilal sea caves, Libya

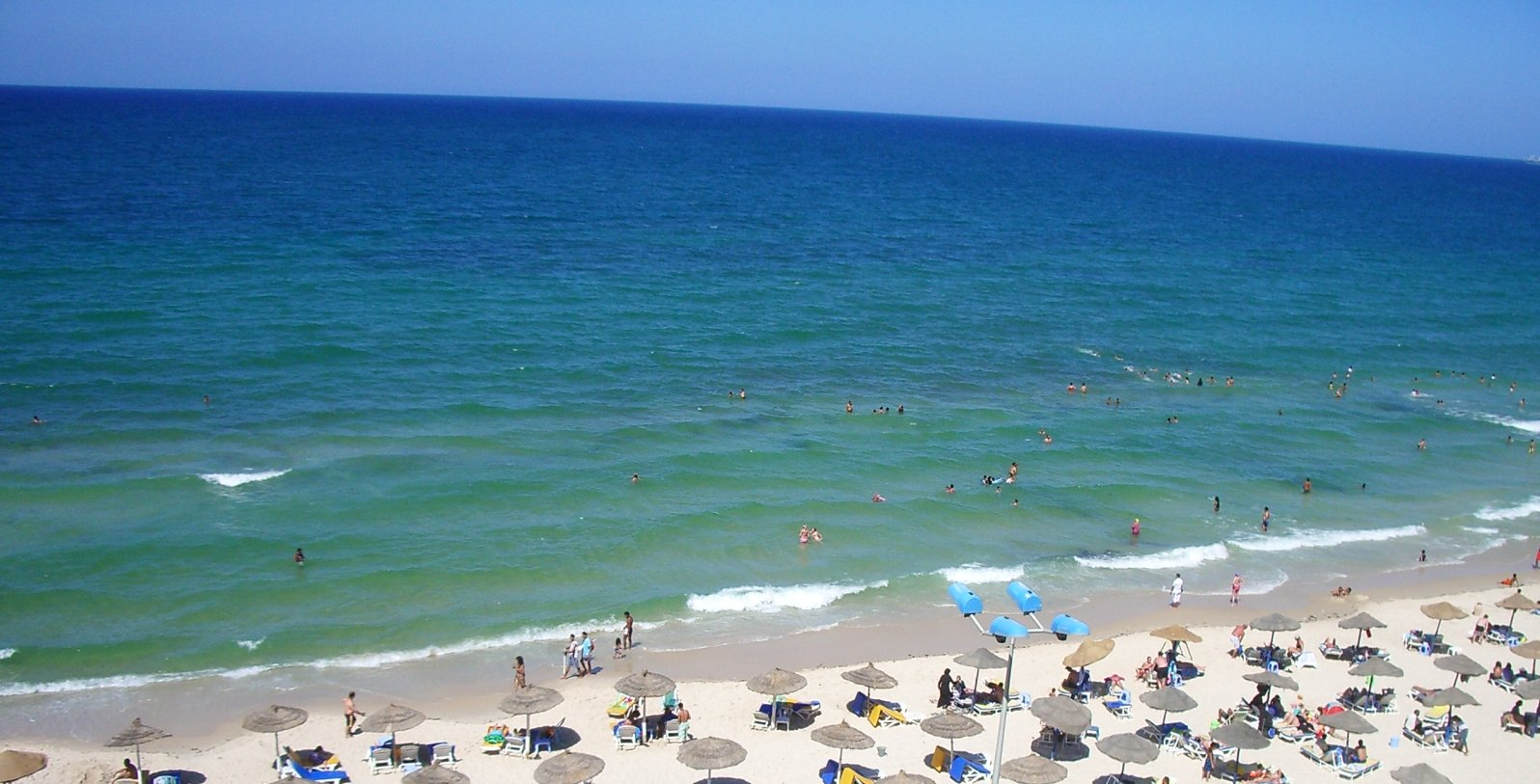
Beach of Hammamet, Tunisia

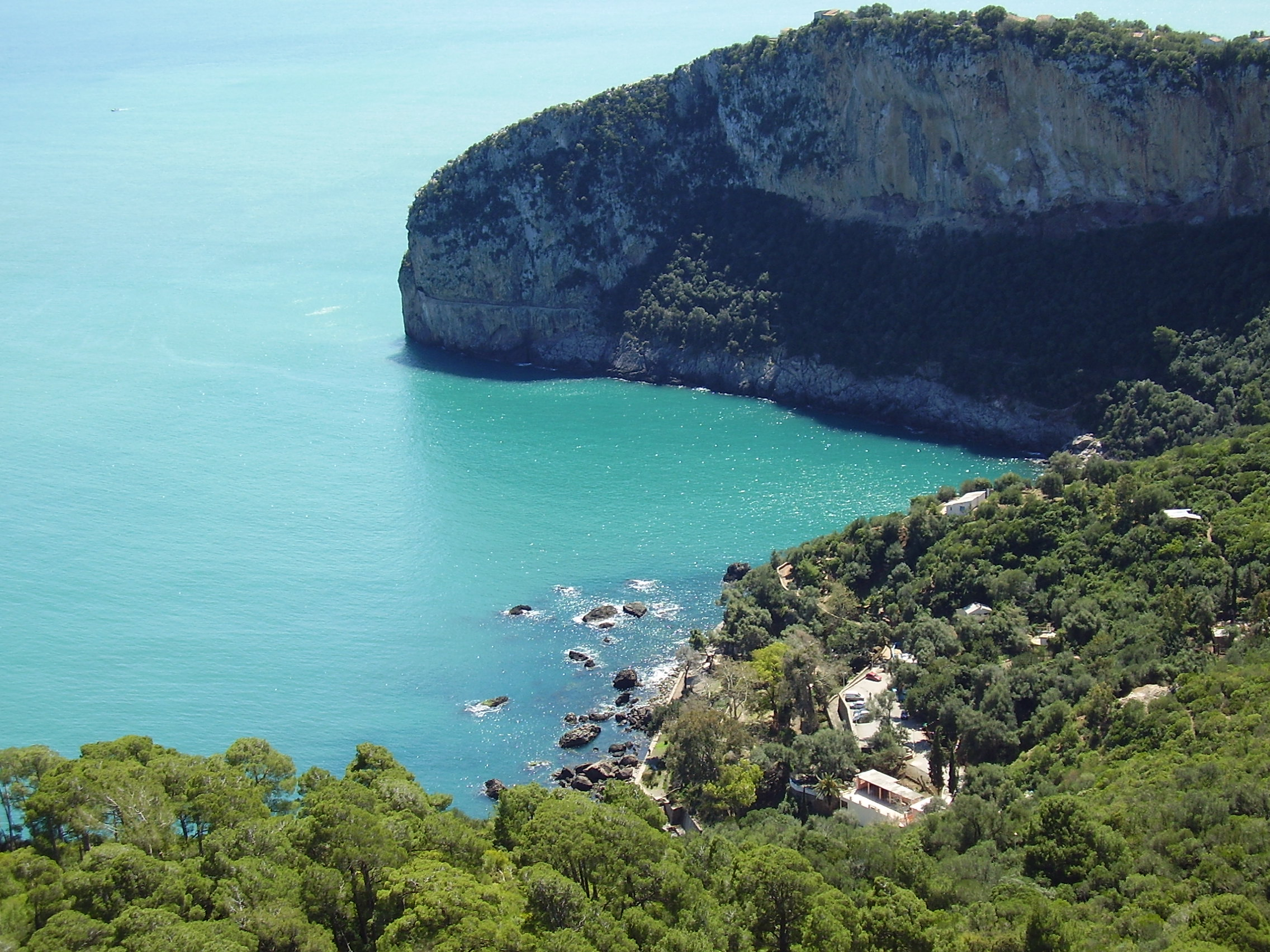
Les Aiguades near Béjaïa, Algeria

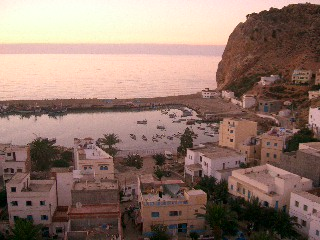
El Jebha, a port town in Morocco

== See also ==
- Aegean dispute – Controversies between Greece and Turkey
- Atlantropa – Proposed engineering project to create new land within the Mediterranean Sea
- Babelmed, the site of the Mediterranean cultures
- Cyprus dispute – Dispute between Greek and Turkish Cypriots
- Cyprus–Turkey maritime zones dispute – Ongoing political dispute in the Mediterranean
- Eastern Mediterranean – Countries that are geographically located to the east of the Mediterranean Sea
- Euro-Mediterranean Parliamentary Assembly – Parliamentary assembly
- Exclusive economic zone of Greece
- Familial Mediterranean fever – Genetic autoinflammatory disease
- History of the Mediterranean region
- Holy League (1571) – Catholic southern European alliance (1571)
- Libya–Turkey maritime deal – Maritime boundary treaty between Libya and Turkey
- List of islands in the Mediterranean
- List of Mediterranean countries
- Mediterranean diet – Diet inspired by the Mediterranean region
- Mediterranean forests, woodlands, and scrub – Habitat defined by the World Wide Fund for Nature
- Mediterranean Games – Multi-sport event of the Mediterranean countries
- Mediterranean race – Outdated grouping of human beings
- Mediterranean sea (oceanography) – Enclosed sea with limited water exchange
- Piri Reis – Ottoman admiral and cartographer – Early cartographer of the Mediterranean
- Qattara Depression Project – Hydroelectric macro-engineering concept in Egypt
- Seto Inland Sea – Japanese Inland Sea – also known as the Japanese Mediterranean Sea
- The Mediterranean: Seaports and sea routes including Madeira, the Canary Islands, the coast of Morocco, Algeria, and Tunisia; handbook for travellers (1911), by Karl Baedeker
- Tyrrhenian Basin
- Union for the Mediterranean – Intergovernmental organization
