= Volcanism of Italy =

Volcanic activity in Italy

Active and quiescent volcanoes present in Italy

The volcanism of Italy is due chiefly to the presence, a short distance to the south, of the boundary between the Eurasian Plate and the African Plate. Italy is a volcanically active country, containing the only active volcanoes in mainland Europe (while volcanic islands are also present in Greece, in the volcanic arc of the southern Aegean). The lava erupted by Italy's volcanoes is thought to result from the subduction and melting of one plate below another.

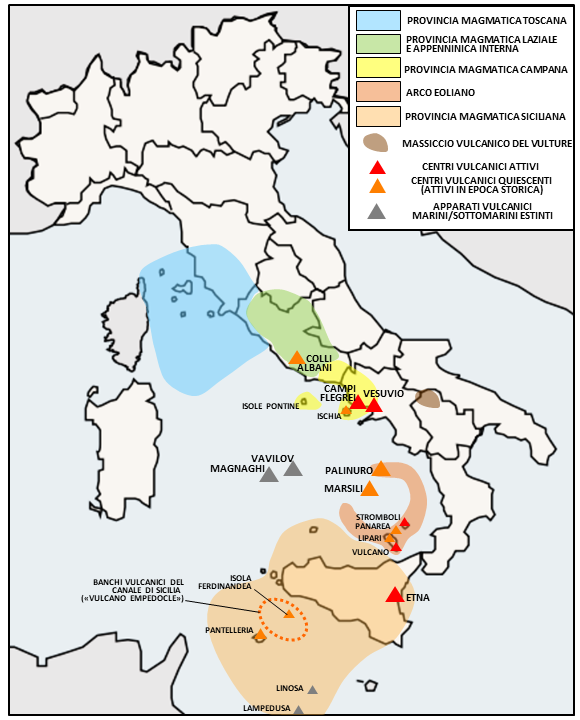
Active and quiescent eruptive centres in Italy grouped into the main magmatic provinces. This map considers the magmatic provinces present from the Middle Miocene to the Quaternary, from active to quiescent centres to late hydrothermal manifestations. Ancient volcanic manifestations (Paleozoic to Lower Tertiary), which are now completely inactive, are not considered here.

Three main clusters of volcanism exist: a line of volcanic centres running northwest along the central part of the Italian mainland (see: Campanian volcanic arc); a cluster northeast of Sicily in the Aeolian Islands; and a cluster southwest of Sicily around the island of Pantelleria, in the Mediterranean's Strait of Sicily. Sardinia has had a totally separate geological history from that of the rest of Italy, where several cycles of volcanic activity occurred, the last of which ended at the beginning of the Pleistocene, but currently hosts only permanently extinct volcanoes.

Due to their position within densely populated areas, Etna and Vesuvius have been included in the list of "Volcanoes of the Decade", a global list of volcanoes to be kept under closer surveillance. In particular, the "Volcanoes of the Decade" is a list drawn up by International Association of Volcanology and Chemistry of the Earth's Interior, as part of a United Nations project, which includes, overall, 16 volcanoes distributed all over the world.

Italy was the first country to exploit geothermal energy to produce electricity. The high geothermal gradient that forms part of the peninsula makes it potentially exploitable also in other regions; research carried out in the 1960s and 1970s identified potential geothermal fields in Lazio and Tuscany, as well as in most volcanic islands.

== Volcanoes ==
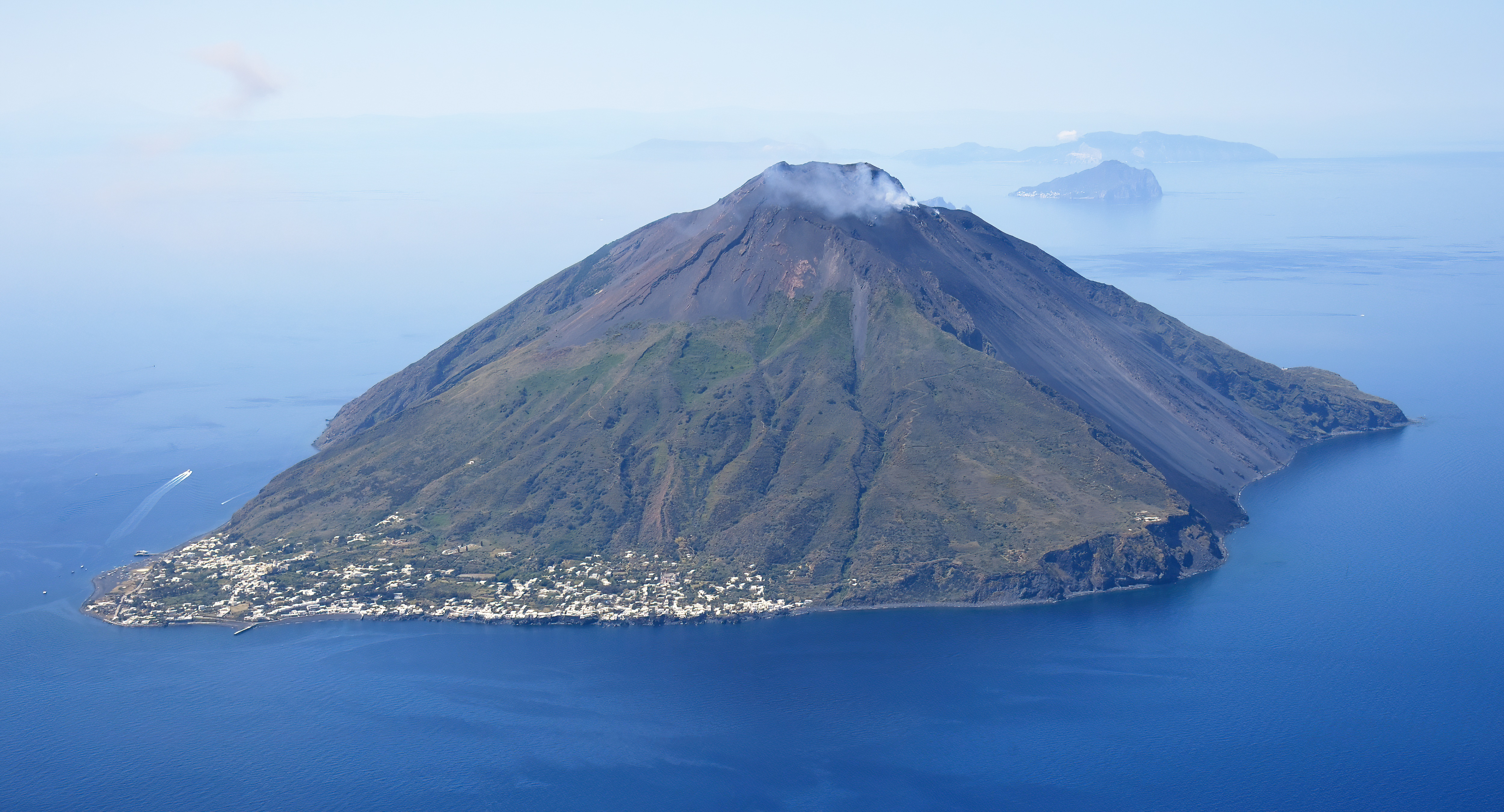
Stromboli

Etna eruption in November 2013

=== Active volcanoes ===
Four of Italy's volcanoes have erupted in the last one-hundred and fifty years:

- Mount Etna, on Sicily (continuous activity). It is the highest volcano in Europe west of the Caucasus. It is currently erupting as of August 2026.
- Stromboli, one of the Aeolian Islands (continuous activity).
- Mount Vesuvius, near Naples (last erupted in 1944); the only volcano to have recently erupted in Continental Europe.
- Vulcano, another of the Aeolian Islands, last erupted in 1888–1890.

=== Dormant volcanoes ===
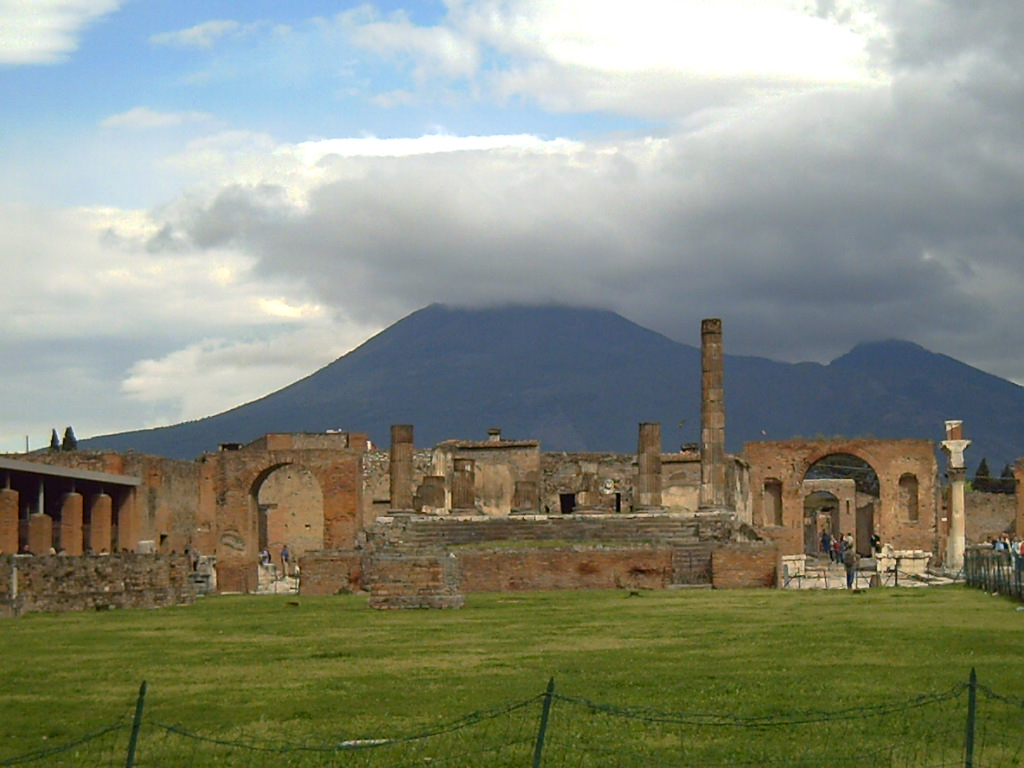
Vesuvius seen from ruins of Pompeii

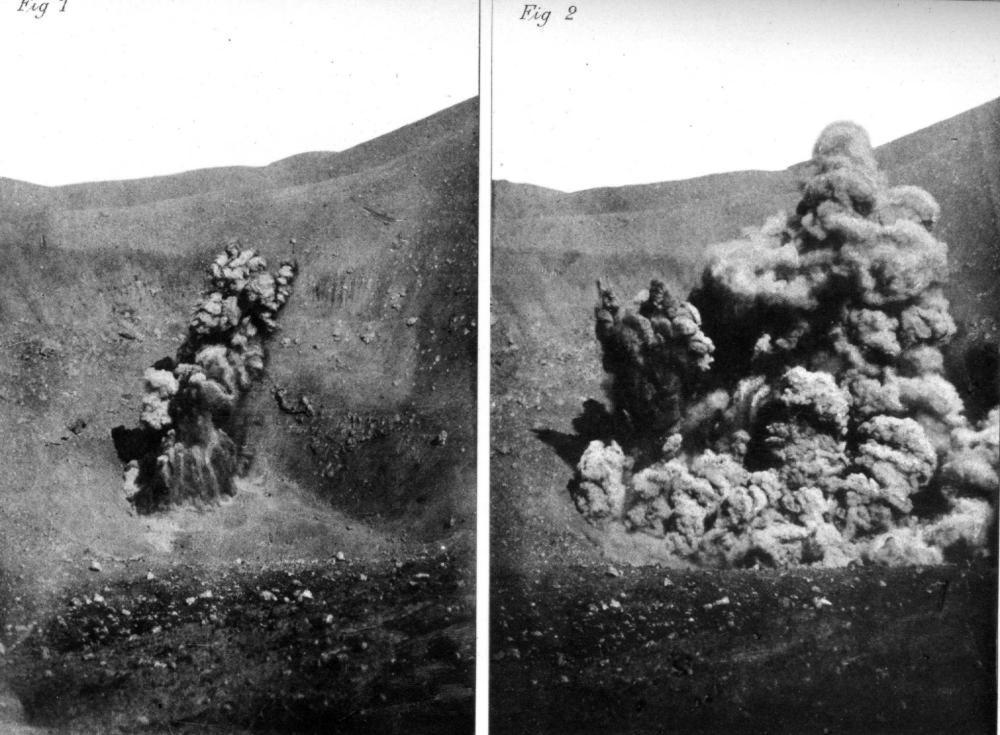
Vulcano eruption of 1889

At least 10 other volcanic centres have seen eruptions in historic times. In order of the most recent eruptions, they are:

- Pantelleria, off the coast of Tunisia, probably last erupted around 1,000 BC. There was a submarine eruption a few kilometres north-east of the island in 1891, which was probably related to the main volcano.
- Vulcanello, a small volcano connected by an isthmus to the island of Vulcano, which erupted out of the sea in 183 BC and showed occasional activity thereafter until the 16th century.
- Phlegraean Fields, a huge caldera containing the western area of Naples, erupted in 1538, generating the small tuff cone named Monte Nuovo ("new mountain").
- Ischia, an island 20 kilometres west of Naples, last erupted in 1302.
- Lipari, an island a couple of kilometres from Vulcano, has a volcano which last erupted in 1230.
- Monte Albano, a quiescent volcanic complex near Rome (south). The most recent eruptions produced Lake Nemi and Lake Albano. It may have last erupted in 5,000 BC, the idea of eruptions during the Holocene have since been questioned, and the last ascertained eruption occurred in 34,000 BC. Since this time interval is comparable to the average dormancy time of the volcano, it cannot yet be considered extinct.
- Sabatini, (Bracciano volcano and Sacrofano volcano) is a volcanic complex and caldera near Rome (north). It last erupted in 70,000 BC, but, as for the Monte Albano, it cannot yet be considered extinct.
- Cimini (Cimino volcano and Vico volcano), a volcanic complex and caldera at the north of the Sabatini volcanic complex. It last erupted in 90,000 BC.
- Panarea, part of the Aeolian Islands, last erupted in the Pleistocene, but a high seismic and gaseous activity suggests that it can be considered quiescent.

=== Underwater volcanoes ===
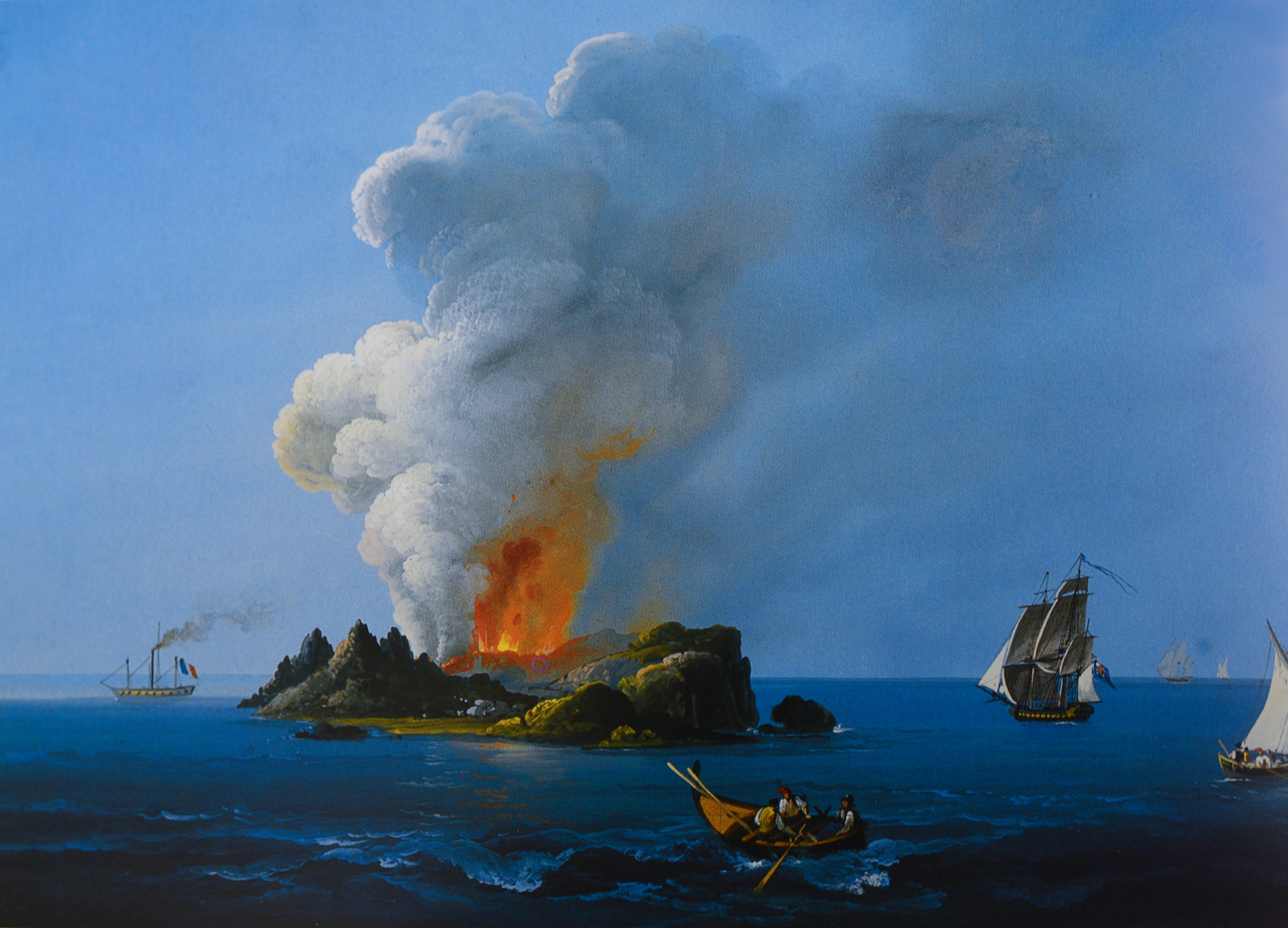
Painting depicting the Isola Ferdinandea in 1831

In addition to the volcanoes on land, there are three submarine volcanoes in the seas surrounding Italy, in particular in the south-eastern Tyrrhenian and in the Strait of Sicily:

- Marsili, a submarine volcano in the Tyrrhenian Sea. Marsili rises 3,000 metres from the seabed in the Tyrrhenian sea 180 km south of Naples. Its summit is only 500 metres below the surface of the water. The volcano last erupted between 2,100 and 5,000 BC, and is considered active, and potentially dangerous, as a possible collapse of the volcanic building could trigger a tsunami. However, it is not yet clear how much this eventuality is actually possible, as there is no evidence of similar collapses (and consequent tsunamis) in the last 700,000 years.
- Isola Ferdinandea, emerged following a surtseyan eruption, a few kilometers north-west of Pantelleria in 1831, reaching a maximum height of 63 meters, but was eroded again at sea level after a few months. The summit is now a few meters below the surface of the sea. A later eruption may have occurred in 1863, but this is not proven. A swarm of small earthquakes in 2002 led to think that magma was moving under the volcano, but no eruption occurred. It is located in the so-called Graham volcanic field, which is believed to be, together with the nearby Terribile and Nerita fields, part of a hypothetical large underwater volcano called Empedocles. However, this hypothesis is not definitively confirmed.
- Palinuro, an underwater volcano in the Tyrrhenian Sea near the Cilento coast. It last erupted around 8,000 BC, and like the Marsili it is considered active and potentially dangerous.

=== Main extinct volcanoes ===
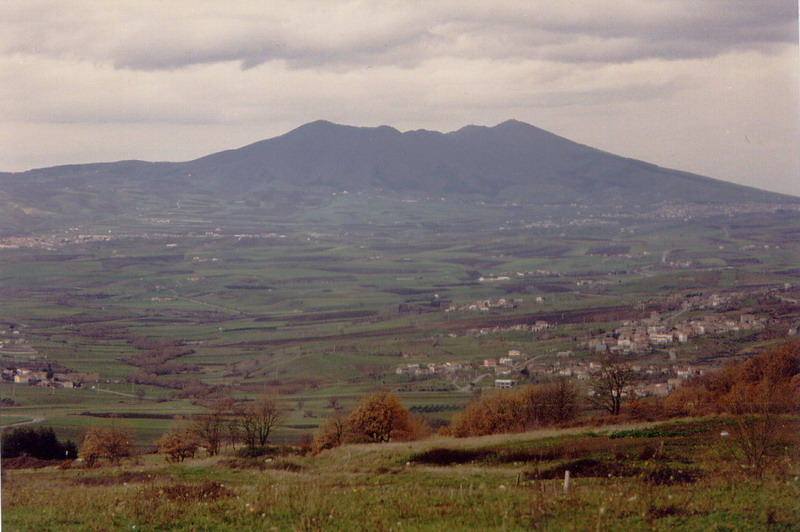
Monte Vulture

In Italy there is also a large number of geological structures due to extinct volcanic centres. It is possible to group these volcanoes into various categories:

- Many smaller islands belonging to the Italian Republic are of volcanic origin; the remaining Aeolian Islands (Alicudi, Filicudi, Salina) and Phlegraean Islands (Vivara and Procida), the Cyclopean Isles, Ustica, Linosa, the Pontine Islands and Capraia.
- Vulsini (Bolsena volcano, Latera volcano, Montefiascone volcano), a caldera complex at the northern end of the Roman magmatic province (at the north of Cimini volcanic complex).
- Lazio anti-Apennines; this area was particularly rich in volcanic activity up to the Upper Pleistocene, leaving behind a large number of volcanoes with a characteristic more or less circular shape (due to the collapse of the magma chamber): Lake Bolsena, Lake Bracciano, Lake Albano, Lake Nemi, Lake Vico. The corresponding volcanic systems are those of the Alban Hills, Monti Sabatini, Monti Cimini, Monti Volsini, and Monti della Tolfa. The first two considered dormant, the others (despite an alleged eruption of the Volsini in 104 BC) are instead considered definitively extinct.
- Still in the anti-Apennines, to the south, are the Roccamonfina (in Campania), Vulture, and the flat-topped Cervati, with Roccamonfina and Vulture both dating back to the Pleistocene and Cervati to an unknown date.
- The landform that the village of Civita di Bagnoregio sits on is an unstable volcanic plateau made of tuff. It has been falling apart due to instability and the Tiber River.
- To the north, in Tuscany, the Monte Amiata last erupted about 130,000 BC, and which still has a remarkable geothermal activity.
- Much older (dating back to the Oligocene) are the Euganean Hills in Veneto. However, geothermal activity is found here.
- In Valsesia (Piedmont) the remains of an ancient supervolcano were found, dating back to about 290 million years ago, long before the formation of the Alps.
- Among the volcanoes of Sardinia the main ones are Monte Arci (whose obsidian was extracted and exported in prehistoric times), Montiferru, Mount Arcuentu and the plateaus of the Giare, of a basaltic nature. These are volcanoes dating back to the period between the end of the Pliocene and the first part of the Pleistocene.
- In the Tyrrhenian Sea there are also numerous submarine volcanoes that are now considered extinct: the Vasilov, the Lametini, the Magnaghi, as well as numerous other underwater mountains whose volcanic nature has only recently been discovered.

== Significant eruptions ==
=== Vesuvius ===
Areas affected by the eruption of Mount Vesuvius in 79 AD

The volcanic system of Somma-Vesuvius is generally characterized by explosive eruptions. The most widely-known is the one that destroyed the Roman cities of Pompeii, Herculaneum, Stabiae and Oplontis in 79 AD, claiming thousands of victims. It is estimated that this eruption had a Volcanic Explosivity Index (VEI) equal to 5, and is considered the archetype of Plinian eruptions, which are named after Pliny the Younger, an eyewitness of the event.

Scholars have discovered that previously Vesuvius had given rise to even more violent Plinian eruptions, the last of which was that of the pumice of Avellino about 3,900 BP (estimated to have a VEI of 6). After 79 AD there were no more plinian eruptions, but at most sub-plinian. The most important were that of 472 AD (whose ash reached Constantinople) and that of 1631, which killed thousands of people (due to pyroclastic flows and lahars),) and which was taken as a reference by Protezione Civile for the drafting of evacuation plans in the event of future eruptions. Due to this eruptive history, and the very high population density in the Metropolitan City of Naples, Vesuvius is considered one of the most dangerous volcanoes in the world.

=== Phlegraean Fields ===
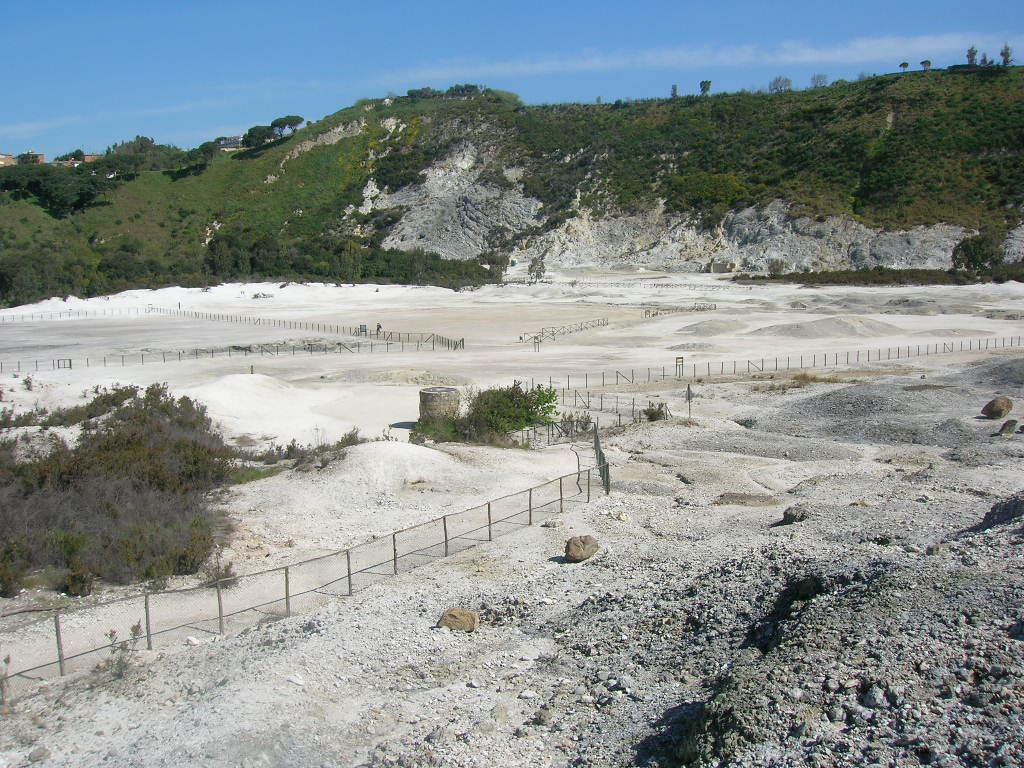
The Solfatara, inside the Phlegraean Fields

Unlike Vesuvius, the nearby Phlegraean Fields are not made up of a single large volcanic edifice, but are a vast volcanic field within which numerous eruptive vents have opened, often different from eruptions. The only eruption in historical times, which generated Monte Nuovo and Lake Avernus, was of low intensity, and was preceded by a period of quiescence that lasted more than 3,000 years (before which there was a long sequence of close eruptions). However, the Phlegraean Fields are capable of producing violent eruptions, which earned them the title of supervolcano.

The most famous was that of the Campanian Ignimbrite eruption, which occurred about 40,000 BP, considered the most severe ever to occur in the Mediterranean area, having a VEI equal to 7, and which probably had effects on the climate worldwide. Only slightly less intense was that of the Neapolitan yellow tuff, which occurred about 15,000 BP. There are also indications of a third large-magnitude eruption, which probably occurred 29,000 BP. For this reason, the Phlegraean Fields are also closely monitored by the Vesuvius Observatory.

They are also characterized by numerous secondary volcanic phenomena, of which the best known is the Phlegraean bradyseism, which in the second half of the 1900s led to the evacuation of entire districts of the city of Pozzuoli.

=== Etna ===
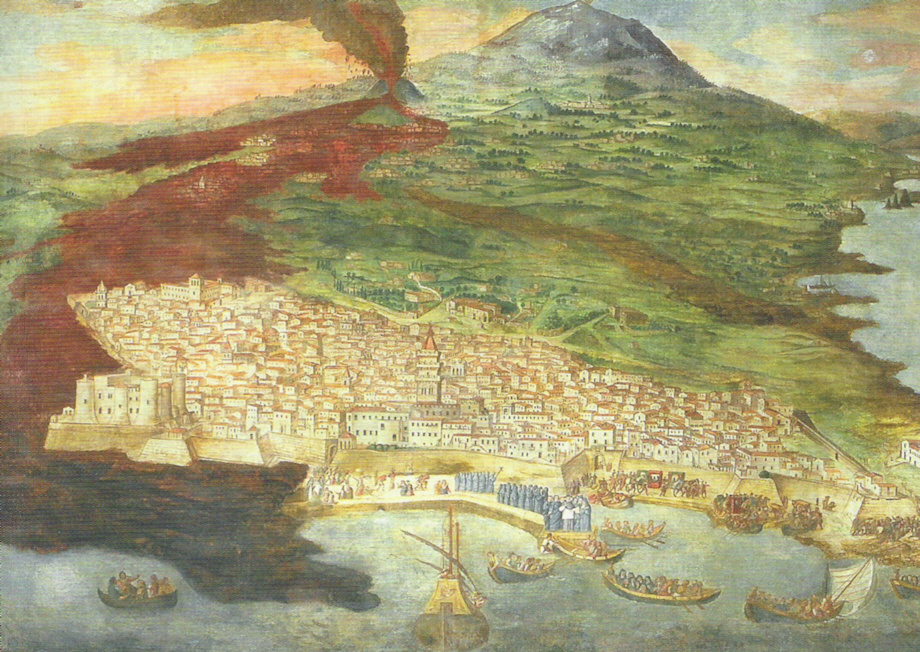
Fresco (preserved in the Catania Cathedral) depicting the large eruption of Etna of 1669, in which the lava flow that reaches Catania is clearly visible

Etna is characterized by an almost continuous eruptive activity, and, unlike Vesuvius, the eruptions of Etna tend to be effusive, with lava flows that can come from both the summit craters and side openings. These eruptions seldom cause high damage, but there are exceptions. The largest effusive eruption of Etna in historical times took place in 1669, when the lava buried numerous villages reaching the sea near Catania, with a flow up to 17 km long. This eruption completely changed the landscape of the area, but due to its effusive nature there were no victims associated with the eruption.

Another eruption of similar magnitude occurred in 396 BC, when the lava flows, reaching the sea, hindered the advance of the Carthaginian army of Himilco during the Greco-Punic wars (as described by Diodorus Siculus). A few dozen deaths were recorded in Bronte in the eruption of 1843, due to a phreatic explosion due to contact between the lava and a source of water. The last highly destructive eruption occurred in 1928, when the lava buried the town of Mascali. In the 1979 eruption, a sudden explosion caused nine deaths and 23 injuries in a group of tourists on excursion, and in that same eruption the last official order to evacuate an inhabited centre was issued due to an eruption of Etna.

The great explosive eruption of 122 BC, a Plinian event, which caused serious damage to the Roman city of Catania, which for this reason was exempt from paying taxes to Rome for a decade, was completely different. A further explosive eruption, of a sub-Plinian type, occurred in 44 BC. This eruptive history, associated with the high population density of the Metropolitan City of Catania (but with a less problematic situation than that of Naples), therefore requires continuous surveillance of the volcano.

=== Stromboli ===
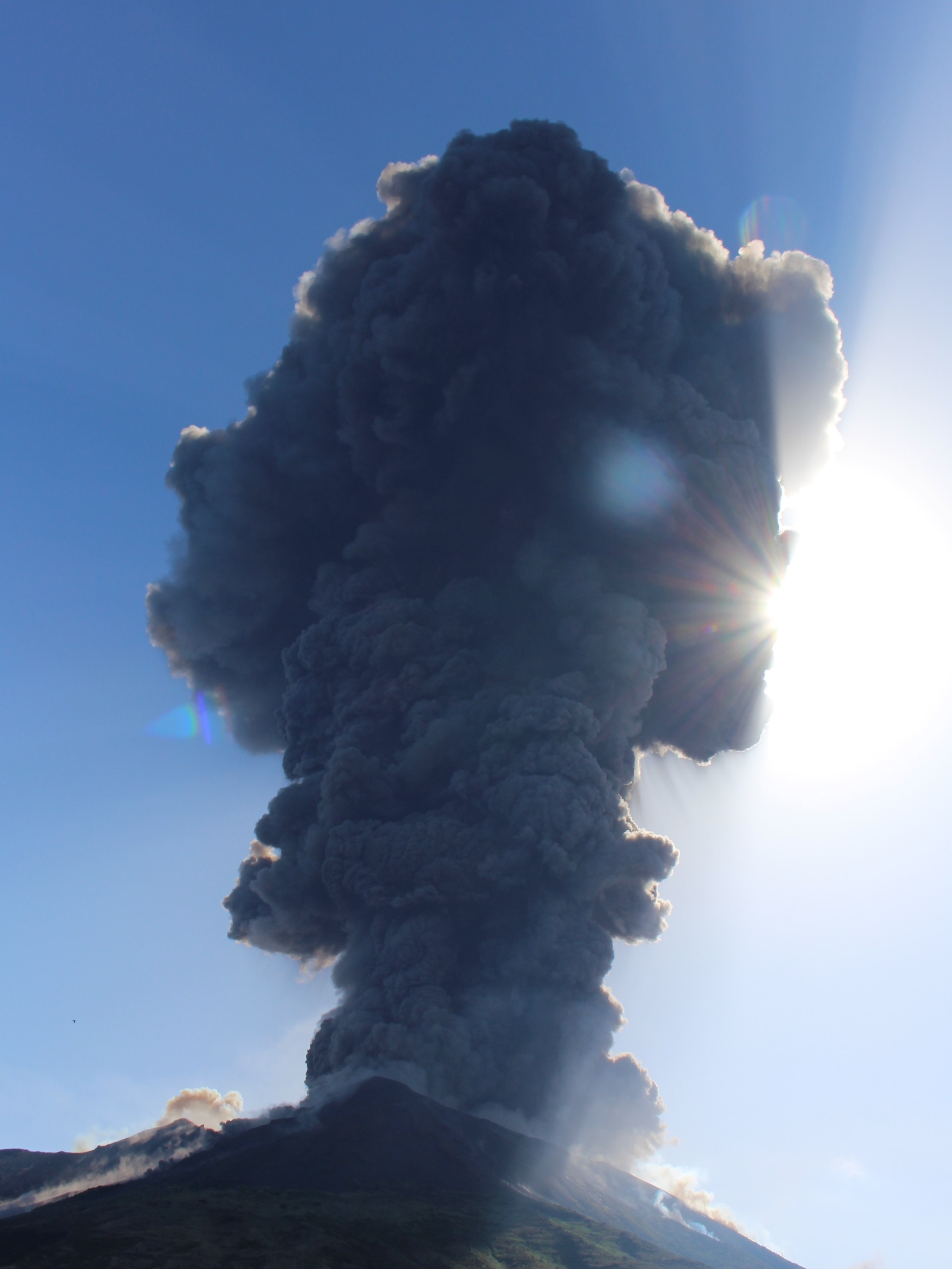
Stromboli eruption on 3 July 2019

Stromboli is one of the most active volcanoes in the world, with almost persistent activity for at least 2,000 years, which is why it was nicknamed the "lighthouse of the Mediterranean". Usually this activity consists of a continuous degassing, interspersed with small bursts of low intensity, at intervals that can vary from a few minutes to a few hours, a type of eruption that is defined precisely as Strombolian.

About 1–2 times per decade, lava can overflow from the summit craters, forming flows that can also reach the sea. These flows usually go towards the north-western area of the island, in the so-called Sciara del Fuoco (a depression shaped like a horseshoe, formed about 6,000 BP,) away from the inhabited settlements. At irregular intervals, Stromboli can give rise to much more violent explosions than normal, called paroxysms, which can instead cause damage to the population.

On 11 September 1930, what is considered the most violent eruptive event of the volcano in the last 13 centuries, occurred with a massive fallout of volcanic material on the inhabited centre of Ginostra and the formation of a pyroclastic flow outside the Sciara del Fuoco. In total, there were four deaths and numerous buildings destroyed. The most recent paroxysmal events occurred on 3 July and 28 August 2019, with the former explosion causing the death of a hiker. In these eruptions, pyroclastic flows able to flow over the sea for a few hundred meters have also been observed.

A further source of danger about Stromboli is the risk of landslides (often in correspondence with the paroxysms), both aerial and submarine, capable of causing tsunami waves. The last event of this type occurred on 30 December 2002, when the wave did damage to coastal buildings. An underwater landslide event of greater proportions could have caused the tsunami in the Gulf of Naples in 1343.

== See also ==
- Geology of Italy
- Geothermal power in Italy
- List of volcanoes in Italy
- National Institute of Geophysics and Volcanology
- Vulcano (Sicily)
