= List of volcanoes in Italy =

This is a list of active and extinct volcanoes in Italy.

Name	Elevation (m)	Elevation (ft)	Coordinates	Most Recent Eruption
Alicudi	675	2215	38°32′N 14°22′E	28,000 YBP
Amiata	1738	5702	42°54′N 11°38′E	Pleistocene
Campi Flegrei	458	1503	40°49′37″N 14°08′20″E	1538
Campi Flegrei Mar Sicilia	Seamount (−8)	−26	37°06′N 12°42′E	1911
Capraia	466	1529	43°02′N 9°31′E	Pliocene
Alban Hills (Colli Albani)	950	3113	41°44′N 12°42′E	5000 BCE
Cimini Hills (monti Cimini)	1053	3454	42°22′01″N 12°11′17″E	800,000 YBP
Mount Etna	3357	11014	37°44′N 15°00′E	2026 (continuing)
Ferdinandea	Seamount (-6)	-18	37°10′N 12°43′E	1863
Filicudi	774	2539	38°35′N 14°33′E	37,000 YBP
Monte Lauro	986	3117	37°44′02″N 15°00′14″E	Pleistocene
Ischia	789	2589	40°44′N 13°59′E	1302
Larderello	500	1640	43°15′N 10°52′E	1282
Linosa	195	640	35°53′N 12°31′E	Pleistocene
Lipari	602	1975	38°29′N 14°57′E	1220
Ora Caldera	–	–	–	277– 274 Ma
Palinuro Seamount	Seamount (−70–80)	−230–260	39°29′06″N 14°49′44″E	8040 BCE
Panarea	421	1381	38°38′N 15°04′E	10,000 YBP
Pantelleria	836	2743	36°46′N 12°01′E	1891
Roccamonfina	1005	3297	41°18′N 14°54′E	52,000 YBP
Sabatini complex	612	2008	42°30′N 12°30′E	40,000 YBP
Salina	965	3166	38°38′06″N 14°52′37″E	13,000 YBP
Stromboli	926	3038	38°47′N 15°13′E	2026 (continuing)
Ustica	239	784	38°43′N 13°12′E	150,000 YBP
Marsili	Seamount 3000 m (−500 m)	−1500	39°15′N 14°23′E	1050 BCE
Mount Vesuvius	1281	4203	40°49′N 14°26′E	1944
Vico	965	3120	42°19′N 12°10′E	95,000 YBP
Vulcano	500	1640	38°24′13″N 14°57′42″E	1890
Vulcanello	123	404	38°24′14″N 14°57′43″E	1550
Vulsini	800	2625	42°36′N 11°56′E	Pleistocene
Monte Vulture	1326	4350	40°56′N 15°38′E	40,000 YBP

== See also ==
- Volcanology of Italy
- List of mountains of Italy
