= Marsili =

Large undersea volcano in the Tyrrhenian Sea south of Naples

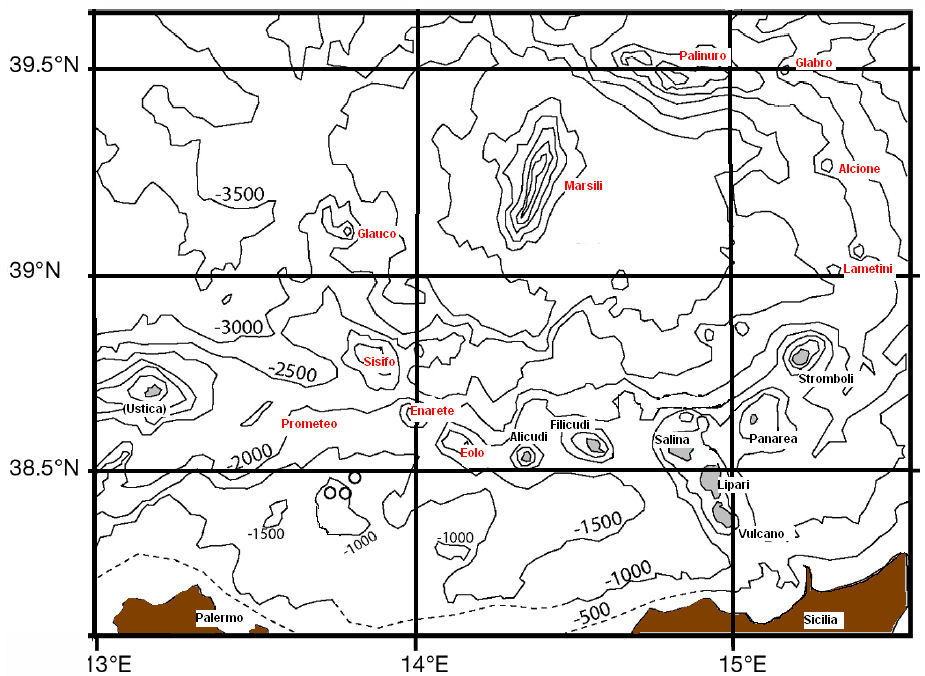
- Aeolian arc, including coastline and depth contour lines for every 500 meters.

- Location within Italy
- Summit depth: −450 m (−1,476 ft)
- Height: 3,000 m (9,800 ft)

Location
- Location: Tyrrhenian Sea
- Coordinates: 39°15′00″N 14°23′40″E
- Country: Italy

Geology
- Type: Submarine volcano
- Volcanic arc/chain: Aeolian Arc
- Last eruption: 1050 BC ± 200 years

Marsili is a large undersea volcano in the Tyrrhenian Sea, it is located approximately 140 kilometers (87 mi) north of Sicily and approximately 150 kilometers (93 mi) west of Calabria. The seamount is about 3,000 m (9,800 feet) tall; its peak and crater are about 450 m below the sea surface. Though it has not erupted in recorded history, volcanologists believe that Marsili is a relatively fragile-walled structure, made of low-density and unstable rocks, fed by the underlying shallow magma chamber. Volcanologists with the Italian National Institute of Geophysics and Volcanology (INGV) announced on March 29, 2010, that Marsili could erupt at any time, and might experience a catastrophic collapse that would suddenly release vast amounts of magma in an undersea eruption and landslide that could trigger destructive tsunamis on the Italian coast and nearby Mediterranean coastlines.

== Geomorphology ==
Marsili belongs to the Aeolian Islands volcanic arc. It is one of the largest volcanoes in Europe, with a length of 70 kilometres (43 mi) and a width of 30 kilometres (19 mi), larger than Mount Etna. It was discovered during the 1920s and named after Italian geologist Luigi Ferdinando Marsili. Extensive studies have been carried on only since 2005 as the Italian National Research Council started a vulcanology research program on the site.

The volcano rises from a plateau of thin oceanic (or pseudo-oceanic) crust with a thickness of only 10 km, which forms its own sea basin. The basin crust is made of tholeiitic basalt which is most typical of inflated basins at the back of oceanic volcanic arcs. The Marsili basin appears to have formed very recently (2 million years) as a consequence of the growth of the volcanic arc, and Marsili could be the result of the thermal inflation of the thin crust at the center of the basin. The start of the volcano activity could date back as recently as 200,000 years ago. Evidence of lava flows on the mountain flanks was found. Evidence of catastrophic collapses of previous other undersea volcanoes in the same area was also found.

== Potential risks ==
Marsili is an active volcano, with numerous satellite volcanic systems. The magma of Marsili is similar in composition to other volcanoes in the Aeolian Arc. The magma of Marsili came from the Ionian subduction of the seafloor of the Tethys Ocean. The volcanic activity started less than 200,000 years ago. Traces of volcanic collapse have been found on the sides of other submarine volcanoes, which may have resulted from tsunamis along the Tyrrhenian coast of southern Italy.

Marsili is on a list of the most dangerous submarine volcanoes of the Tyrrhenian Sea, along with Magnaghi, Vavilov, and Palinuro. As with Vavilov, Marsili is at risk of a major collapse from a single event. In addition, hydrogeological deep-water surveys show that there is geothermal activity on Marsili.

Marsili has been studied since 2005 as a strategic project of the Italian National Research Council by means of a sonar system and integrated monitoring networks for ocean observations. In February 2010, the research vessel Urania began a study on the submerged volcano. Considerable instability has been detected. A significantly large region of the Marsili summit is also made up of low-density rocks, strongly weakened by hydrothermal alteration phenomena; which could cause a large collapse event.

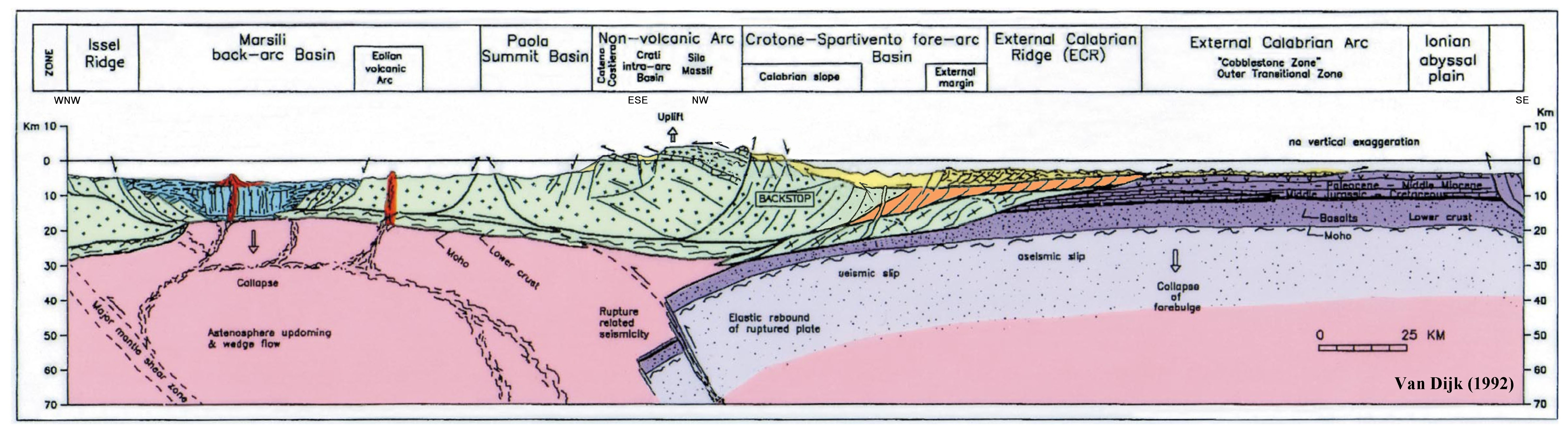
Geological, geotectonic, structural section of the Central Mediterranean Subduction System

== See also ==
- List of volcanoes in Italy
- Volcanism in Italy
- Seamount
- Submarine volcanoes
