= Vulcano (Sicily) =

Complex stratovolcano in the Mediterranean

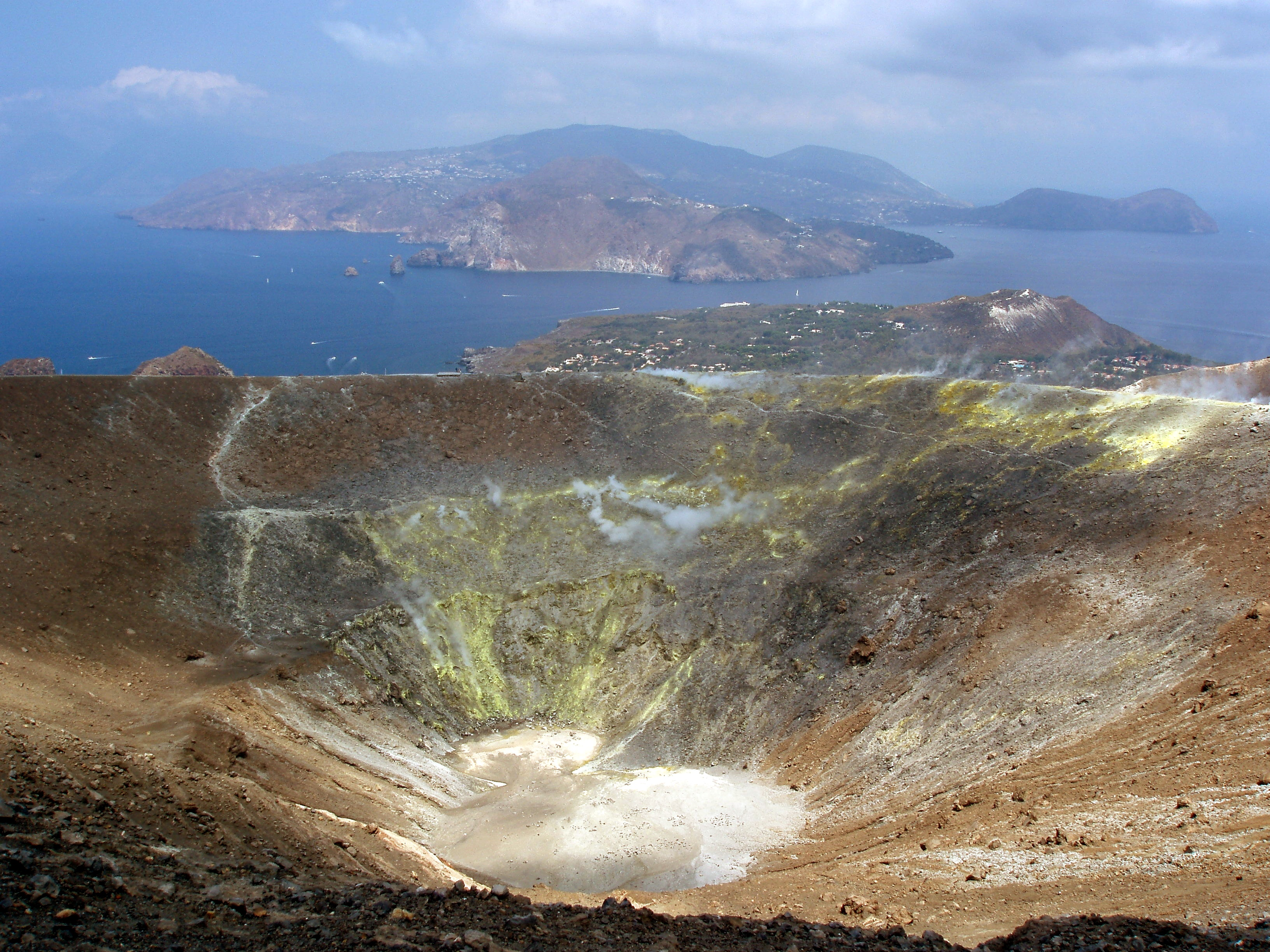
- The Gran Cratere on Vulcano Island, in the middle of the Vulcanello, in the background Lípari

Highest point
- Prominence: 386 m (1,266 ft)
- Coordinates: 38.405°N 14.96°E

Geography
- Location: Lipari, Messina, Sicilia, Italy
- Parent range: Aeolian Arch

Geology
- Last eruption: 1890

Vulcano is a complex stratovolcano in the Mediterranean. It is the eponymous volcanic complex comprising the island of Vulcano in the Aeolian archipelago. The origin of the word volcano is derived from the name of this volcanic island, which in turn owes its name to the Roman god of fire, volcanoes, and metalworking, Vulcan, who in classical Roman mythology resided on this island.

== Geology ==
This volcanic complex was created due to the African plate subducting under the Eurasian plate. Vulcano’s central peak is 386 meters above sea level. It is visible from the ground as a hill in the island's center, near Porto Levante. The slope’s composition is of various types (sandy landscape, porous pumice-type formations, and the presence of more glassy oxydian-type remnants). The vegetation cover decreases as altitude increases. Around half-way up the hill, only gorse grows; near the main crater, the ground is completely bare.

== Volcanic epochs ==
Volcanic activity at Vulcano can be split up into 8 different eruptive Epochs:

Summary of Eruptive Epochs reconstructed for Vulcano Island eruptive history
Eruptive Epoch	Synthem	AGE (Time Span)	Active volcanic centres (lithosomes)	Synthetic description
Eruptive Epoch 1	Paleovulcano (informal unit)	127–113 ka ca.(1)	Capo Secco (small shield volcano)	Effusive eruptions
Eruptive Epoch 2	Casa Grotta dell’Abate	117–101 ka ca.(1)	Primordial Vulcano (Serro di Punta Lunga stratovolcano)	Effusive to subordinate Strombolian activity, with minor phreatomagmatic eruptions
Eruptive Epoch 3	Scoglio dell’Arpa	99.5–94 ka ca.(1)	Scoglio Conigliara caldera ring faults	Mainly effusive activity and subordinate phreatomagmatic eruptions (PDC)
Eruptive Epoch 4	Rio Grande	83–78 ka ca.(1)	Monte Aria and Timpa del Corvo fissures (mostly located along the rims of Piano Caldera); Casa Petrulla scoria cone	Effusive activity producing lava piles; phreatomagmatic dilute PDCs interlayered with Strombolian fallout deposits
Eruptive Epoch 5	Il Piano	70–42 ka ca.(1)	Il Cardo, Monte Rosso, Punta Luccia, La Sommata (tuff-cones or scoria cones)	Dilute PDC activity alternated to minor Strombolian fallout; effusive and/or pure Hawaiian to Strombolian activity
Eruptive Epoch 6	Serra delle Felicicchie	28–21 ka ca.(1)	Monte Lentia dome field (“Lentia group”, Keller 1980; “Lentia complex”, De Astis et al. 1997b) and other vents, originating various: P. Sciarra del Monte, Sc. Capo Secco, P.ta Bandiera, Faro vecchio	Various effusive and explosive (Quadrara Fm.) western border activities generating lava domes and coulees, scoriae/pumices blankets, lava flow
Eruptive Epoch 7	Vallonazzo (Menichedda sub-synthem)	< 21 ka to 10 ka ca.(1)	La Fossa caldera (LFC) borders and inner vents, Punta Roja, Monte Lentia	Medium- to high-energy PDC (Piano Grotte dei Rossi Fm. ≡ Upper Brown Tuffs (2)); effusive activity (domes, lava flows)
Eruptive Epoch 8	Vallonazzo (Porto di Levante sub-synthem)	from 9–8 ka to the last eruption (1888–1890 AD) (1)	Mt. Saraceno, LFC western (small domes and lava flow), La Fossa tuff-cone, Vulcanello cone(s)	Frequent phreatomagmatic eruptions with both Vulcanian style (low-energy PDC and fallout) or PDC-dominated (La Fossa cone and inside LFC: i.e. final units of Upper Brown Tuffs). Strombolian to Hawaiian and effusive activity (Mt. Saraceno, Vulcanello, La Fossa). Dome-type activity (LFC border)

== Great Pit Crater ==
The main crater, about 500 metres (1,600 ft) in diameter, is named “Great Pit Crater”, and is also called the “Grand Crater”. The rim is located at an elevation of 386 metres (1,266 ft), and is surrounded by slopes leading to greater heights (Lentia Mountains).

== Other craters ==
In the vicinity of the Great Pit Crater, there are the remains of two other craters:

1. Old Vulcano is located to the south: it includes the two peaks of Mount Saraceno and Mount Aria, which reach altitudes of around 500 metres (1,600 ft). This is the original volcanic edifice, still the highest in the entire complex.
2. The Lentia, to the northwest, is much smaller: the Fossa crater was formed from the interior of this crater.

In addition to the Grand Crater, Old Vulcano, and the Lentia, there is a peripheral complex. Next to the island of Vulcano are the cones of Volcanello, joined to the island of Vulcano by an isthmus called the Isthmus of Vulcano.

== Recorded history ==
=== Vulcano in ancient times ===
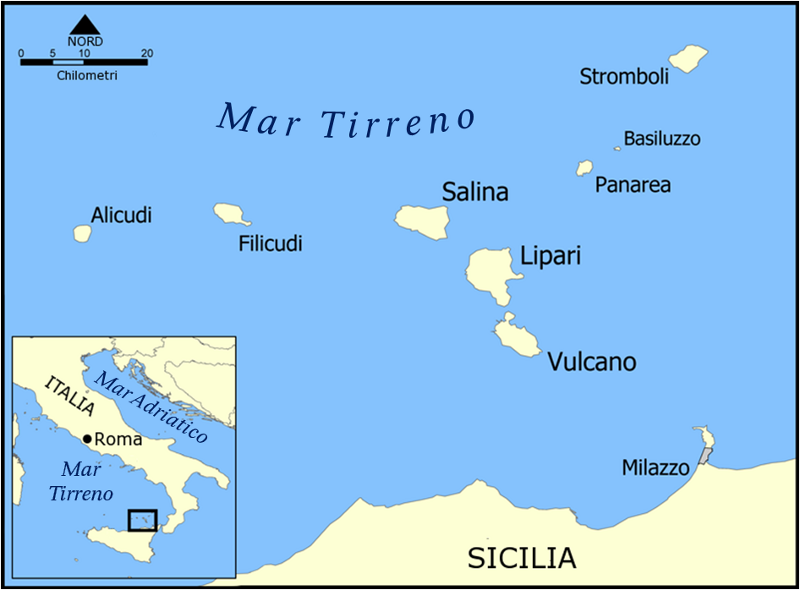
Geographic location

Vulcano has produced half a dozen devastating eruptions over the past millennia. The Fossa crater has been active at irregular intervals since ancient times, as documented by classical writers, particularly Thucydides in the fifth century B.C. During this time period, records suggest the island produced eruptions that were audible as far as Sicily. After centuries of irregular eruptions, the Fossa crater began a prolonged phase of dormancy.

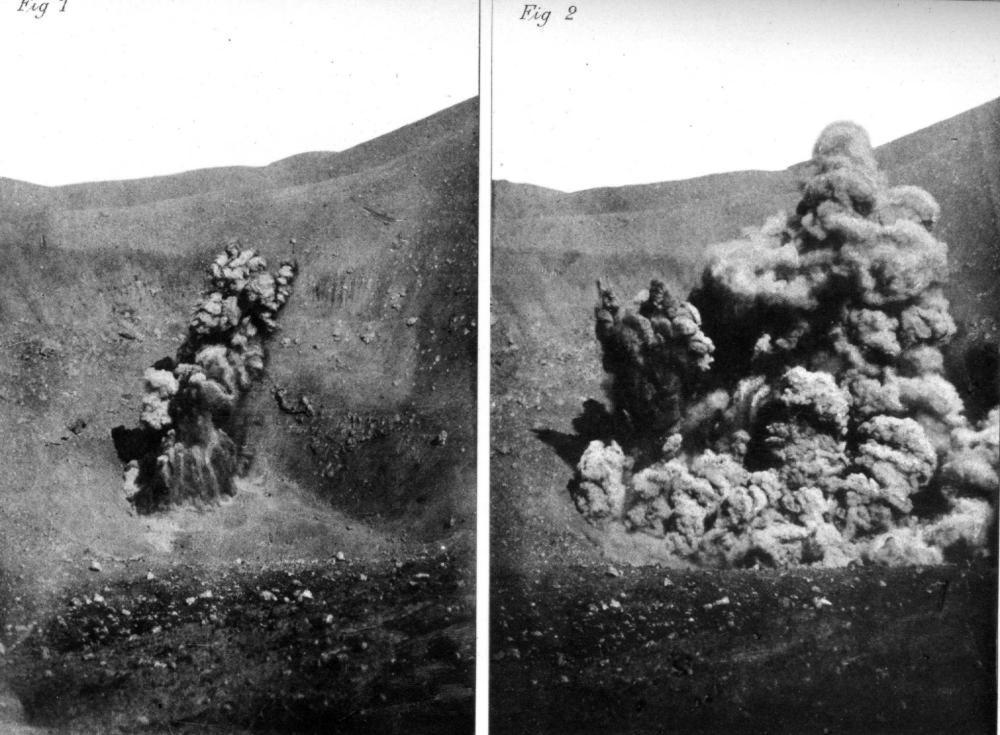
Eruption of 1889

In the second century B.C., next to the island of Vulcano, the new crater of Vulcanello emerged from the sea, which, erupting, gave rise to a small island located next to the mother island. The eruption causing the creation of Vulcanello, was also documented in antiquity in a dramatic style. The dormancy of the Great Crater was recorded as lasting until the sixth century A.C.

=== Vulcano in modern times ===
Between 1727 and 1739, the activity of the Grand Crater resumed; following this eruptive awakening, the lava flow of fired stones (obsidian) was observed. Spilled ash fell on Lipari, Salina, Stromboli, and the Sicilian coast opposite. Further eruptions are also documented in 1771 and 1783.

Fumaroles of Vulcano

The last eruption occurred between 1888 and 1890. The latter was heralded in 1886 by a phreatic eruption (i.e., caused by steam formed as a result of water heating). The last eruptions in this series were of the Vulcano type: so-called bread crust bombs (solidified lava) and ash were catapulted from the Great Crater. An expedition of researchers was organized by the government. In particular, the eruption was documented by the famous seismologist Mercalli.

=== Current Unrest ===
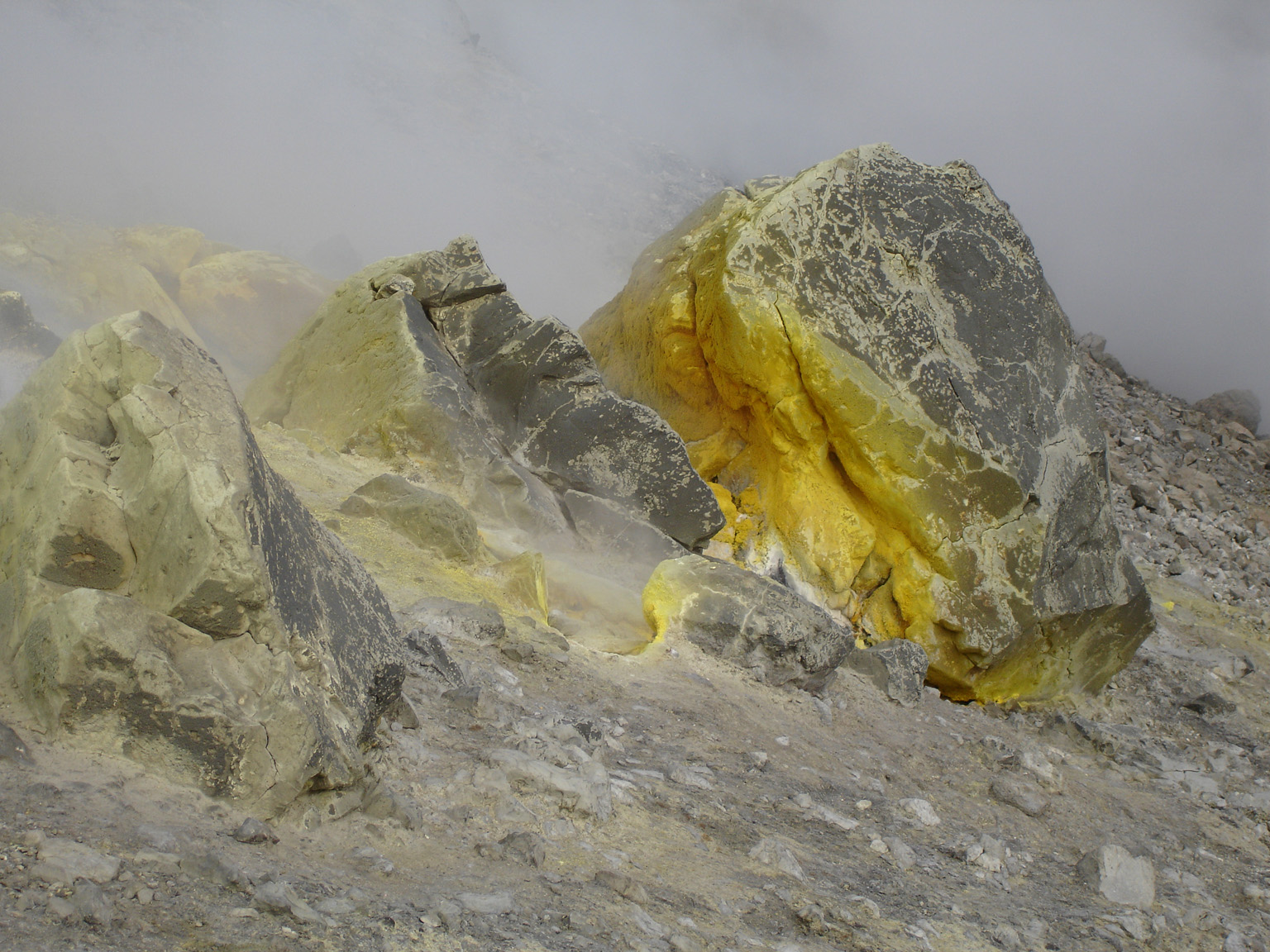
Boulders near fumaroles, with a yellow patina of sulfur

Since the time of the last violent eruption, only fumarole activity has been recorded volcanic exhalations consisting of the production of steam and volcanic gases. In the case of Vulcano, it is mainly sulfur, which, thanks to the action of bacteria, contributes to the formation of a colored patina on the surfaces of soil and stones.

The activity of fumaroles has been documented for centuries and has continued in alternating phases to the present day. While it was very modest in the 1970s, there was increased activity at the turn of the 1980s and 1990s that raised serious concerns.

On the beach at Porto Levante, the water and mud are heated by the heat of sulfur dioxide produced by the weaker fumaroles. This small coastal area has long been famous for bathing: mud baths on Vulcano have a reputation for benefiting the skin and having therapeutic effects.

Starting in the summer of 2021 and that of September, there has been an increase in fumarole activity, with a rise in the temperature of the gases and the amount of CO_{2} and SO_{2} in them, as well as an increase in microseismic activity. For this reason, the Civil defense raised the volcanic alert level from green to yellow starting in October. Following a subsequent decrease in these phenomena, the alert level was returned to green in December 2023.

In the fall of 2025, volcanic unrest increased again with strong gas emissions reported on October 15, 2025.

== Excursions ==
The ascents to the peaks of Vulcano are typically done on foot, starting from Porto Levante. Ascents to the Grand Crater for people in average physical condition typically do not require much effort nor a guide. Elderly people and people sensitive to sulfurous gases have complained about the difficulty of reaching the peak. It is frequently advised to avoid getting near the fumaroles. Before the descent back down to Porto Levante, there is an option to have a guided tour around the crater.

== Gallery ==
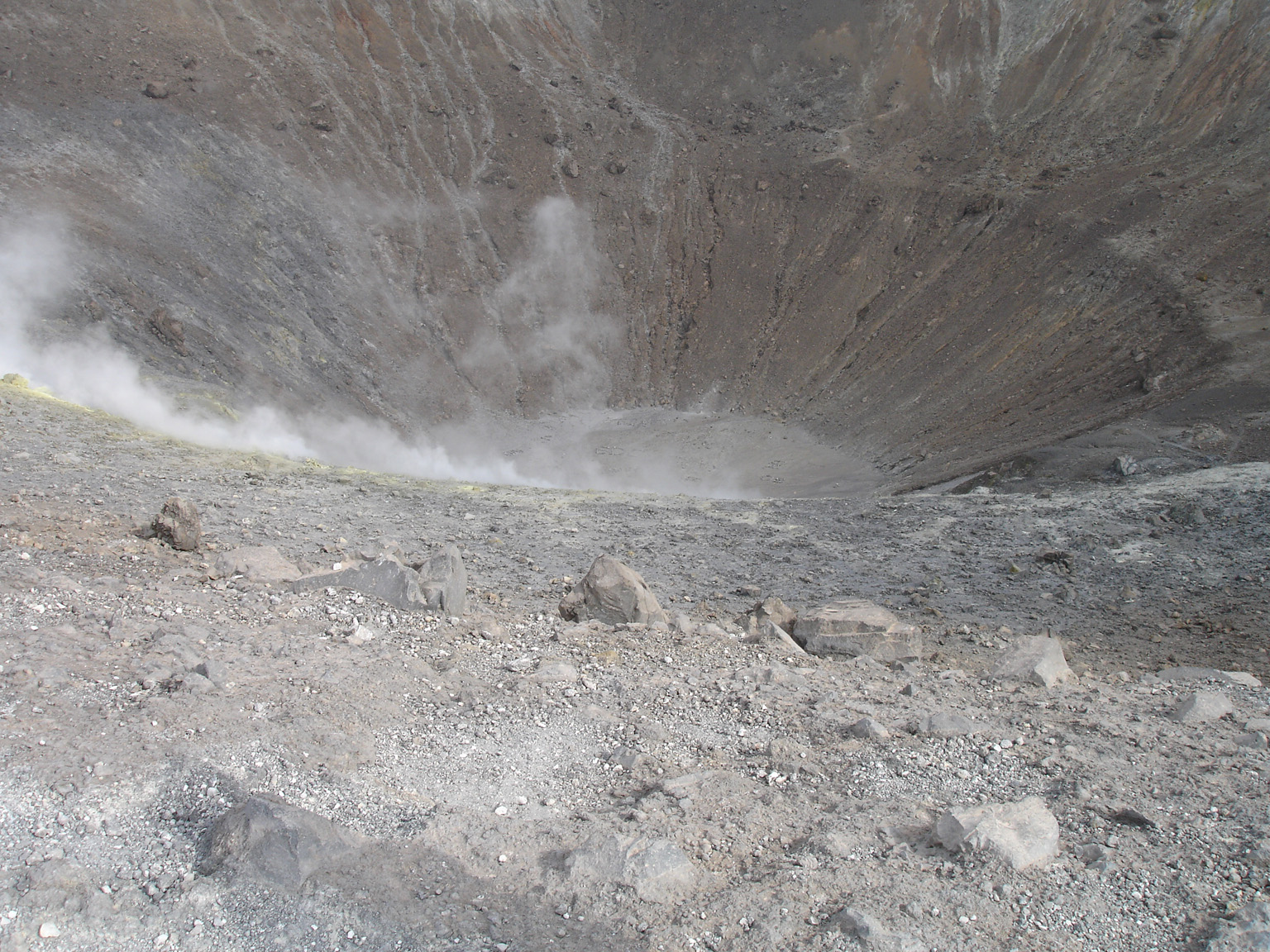
The Great Crater as seen from the rim

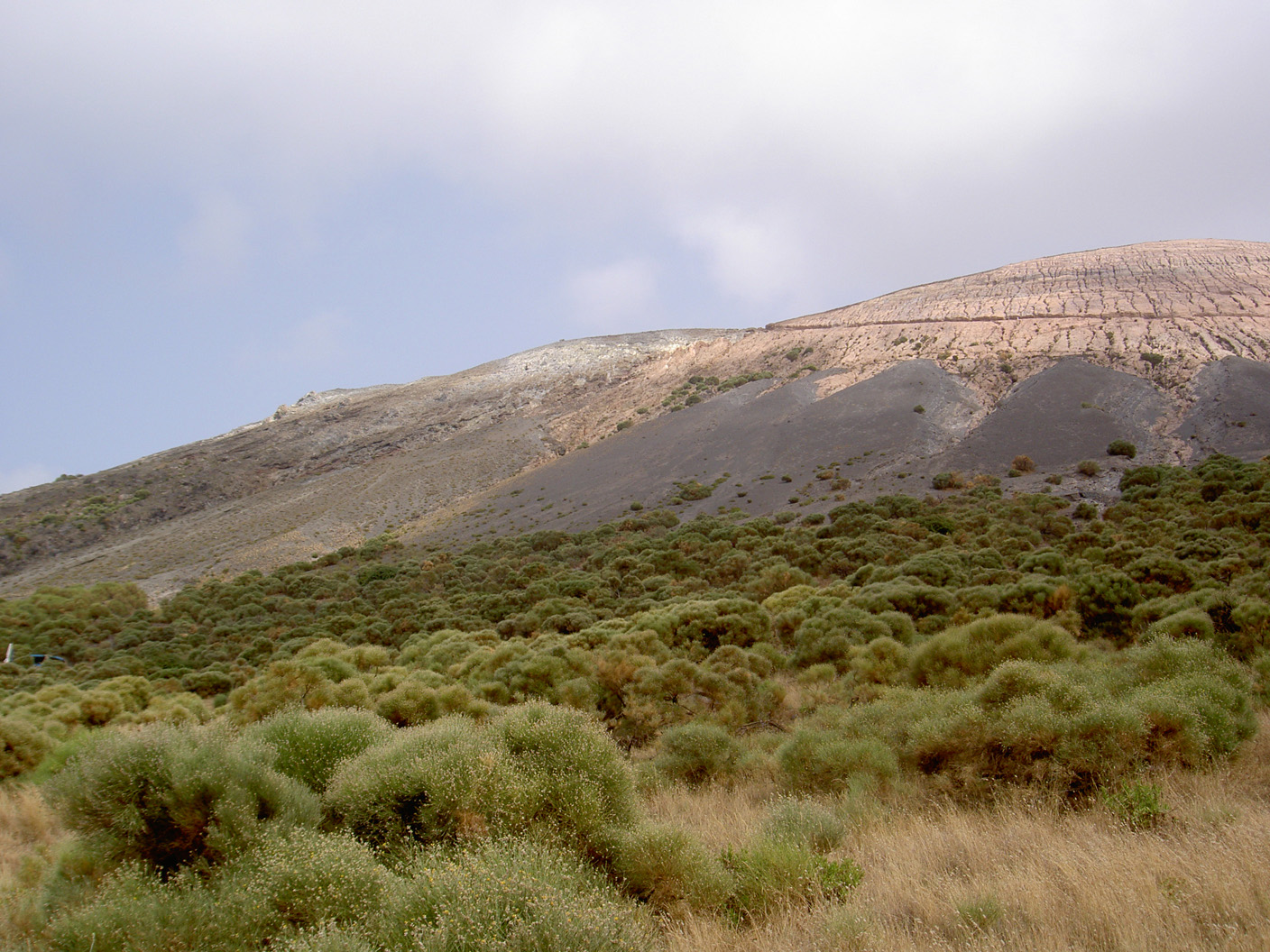
View from the vicinity of Porto Levante

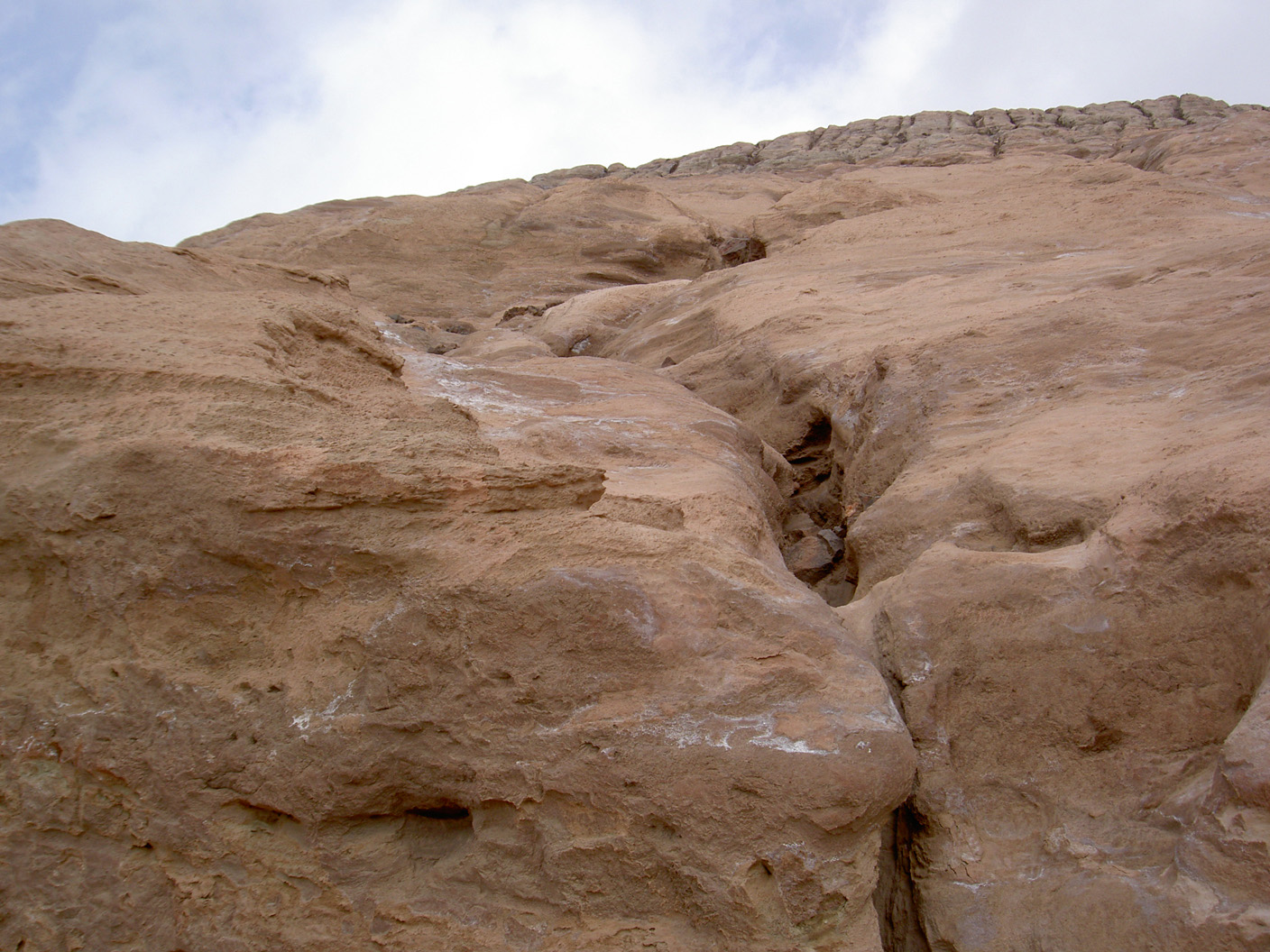
Slope in the vicinity of the crater

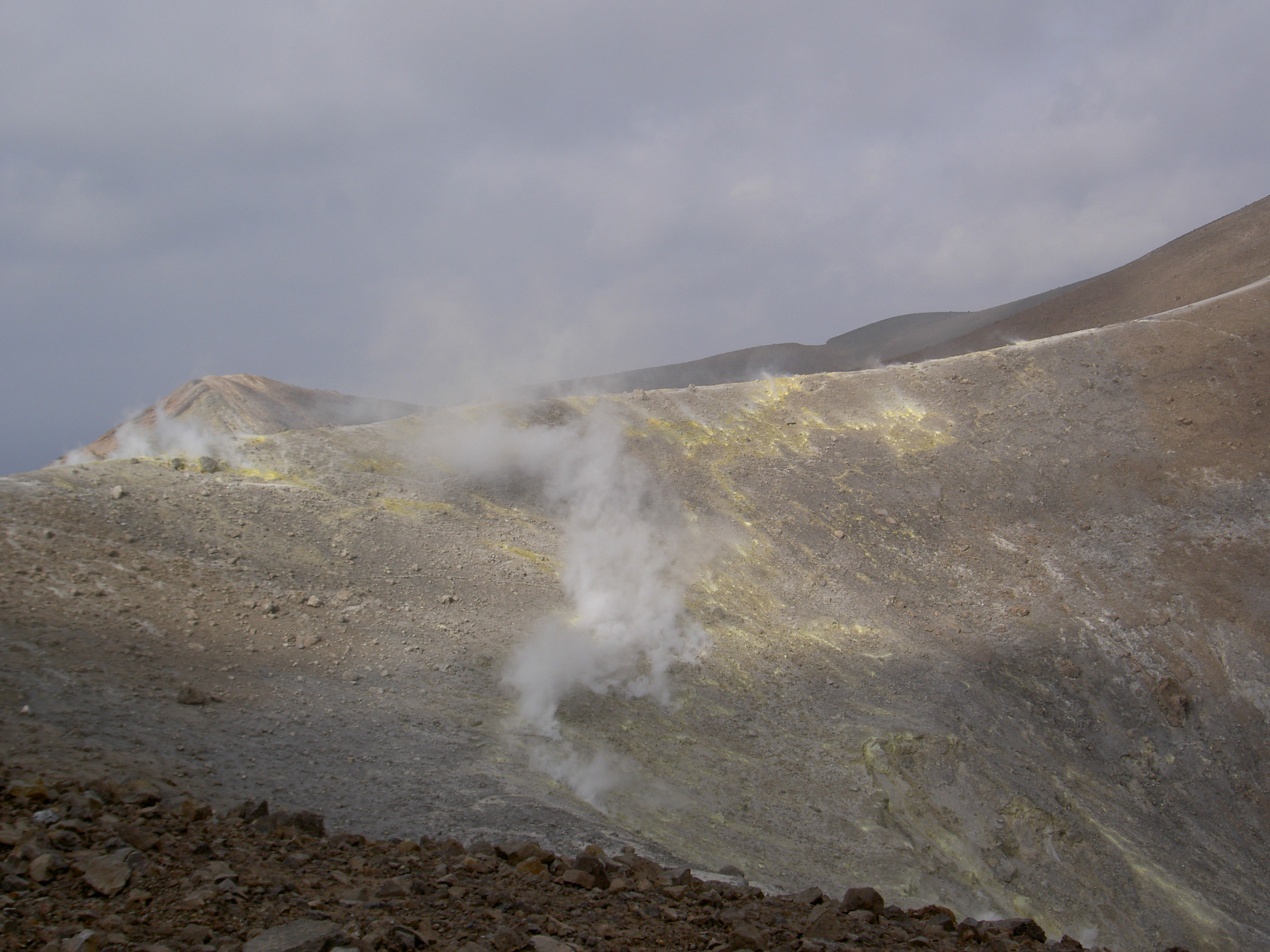
Fumarole, overview

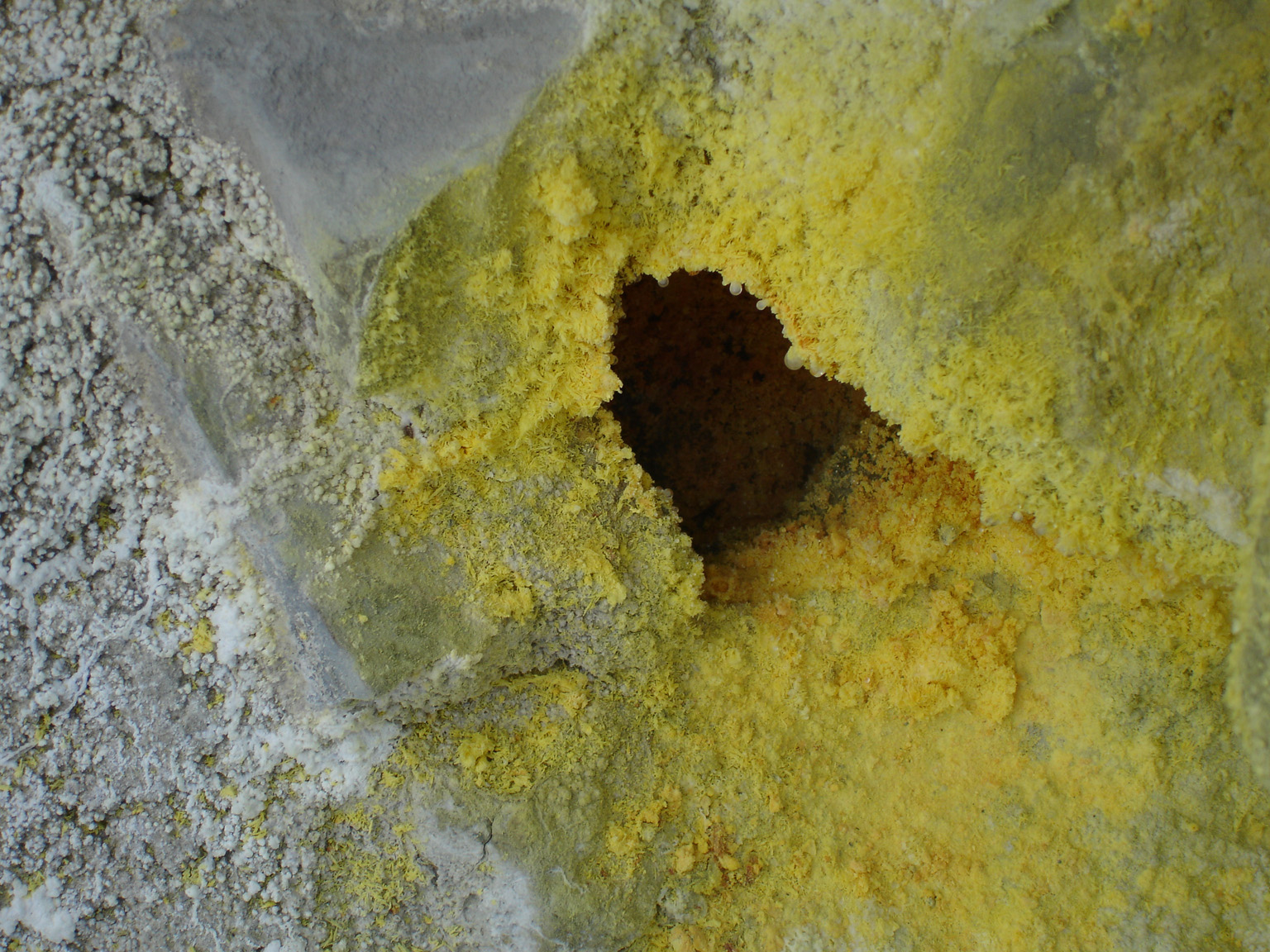
Fumarola, detail

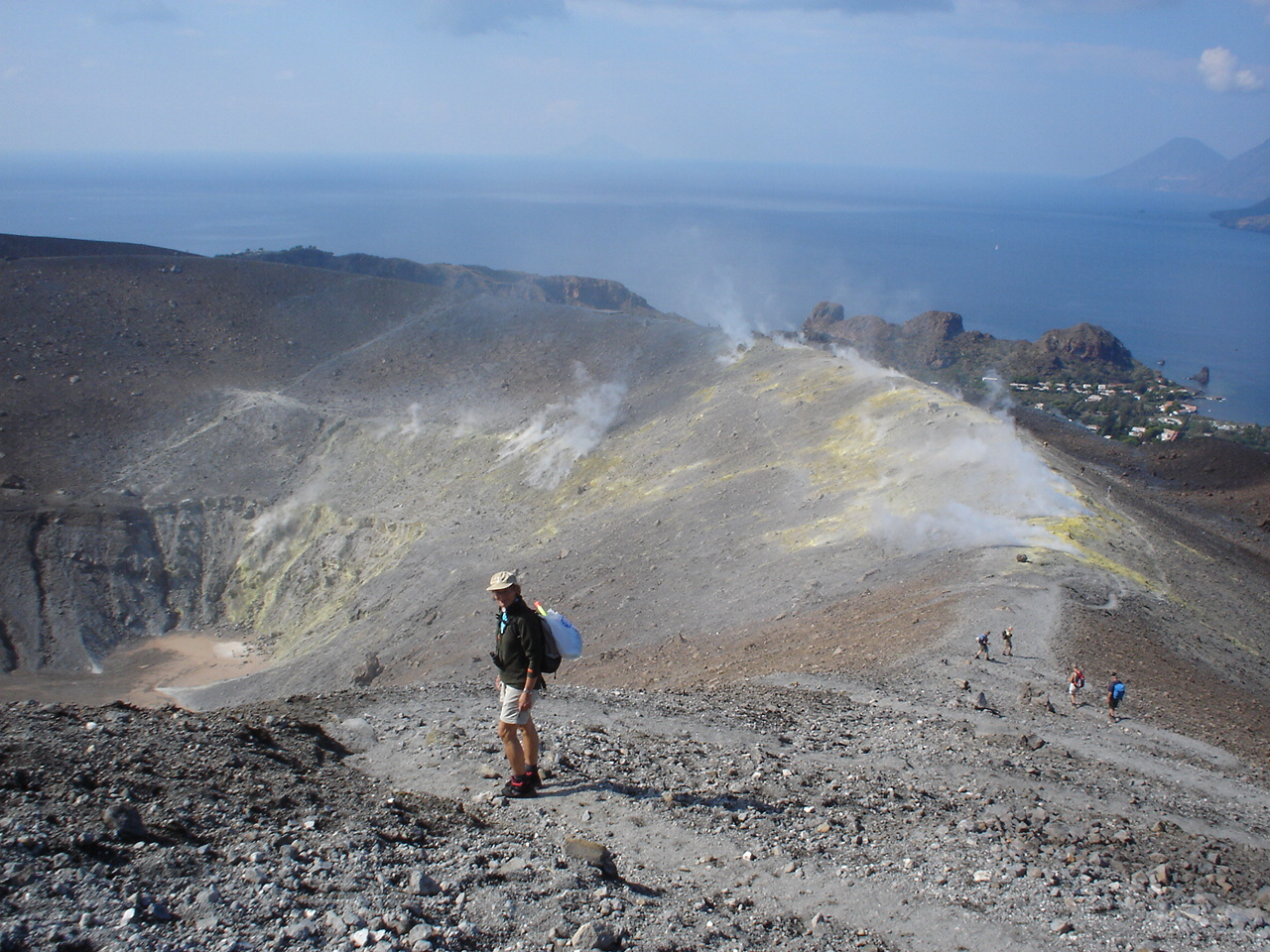
View from the edge of the crater

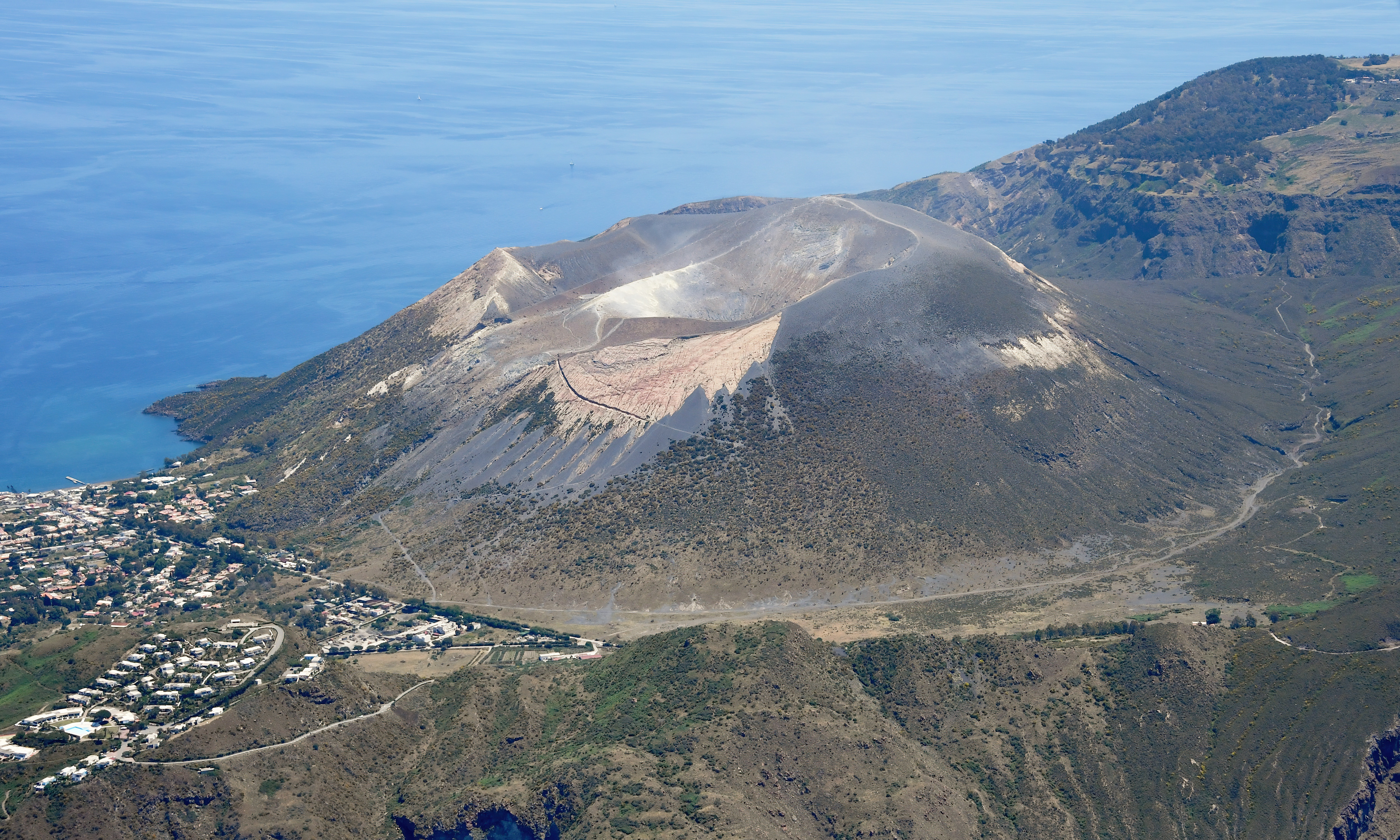
Overview

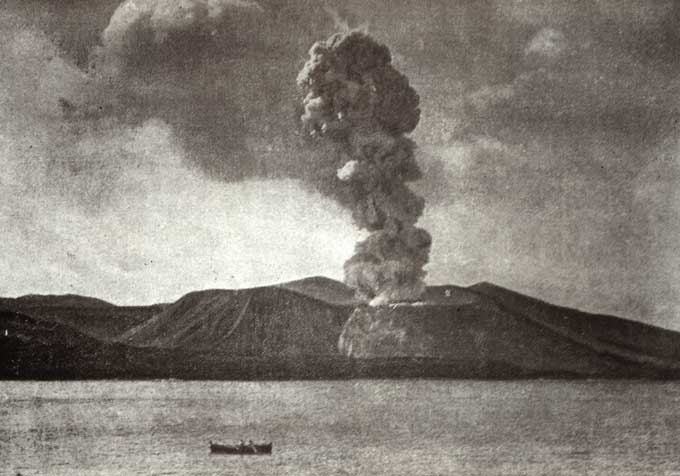
Eruption of 1890

== See also ==
- Vulcano (island overview)
- Stromboli
- Volcano
- Volcanism of Italy
