= Geology of Italy =

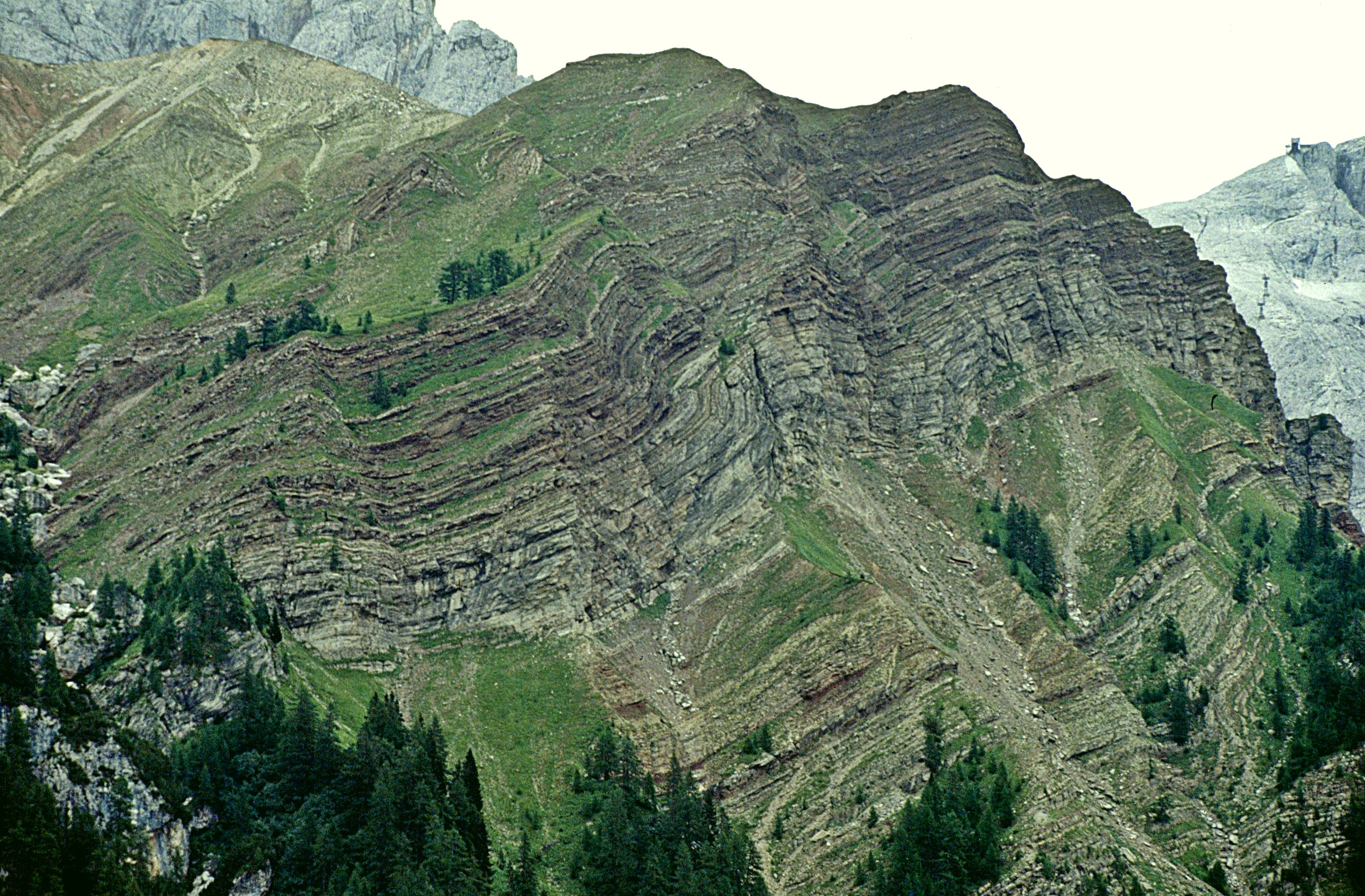
Tilted layers of sedimentary rock in the Rolle Pass in the Dolomites, Trentino

The geology of Italy includes mountain ranges such as the Alps and the Apennines formed from the uplift of igneous and primarily marine sedimentary rocks all formed since the Paleozoic. Italy has also been shaped by volcanic activity; four active volcanoes are located in the south of the country, in peninsular Italy and three islands of insular Italy, and there are many more dormant and extinct volcanoes.

== Geologic history, stratigraphy, and tectonics ==
=== Paleozoic (541-251 million years ago) ===
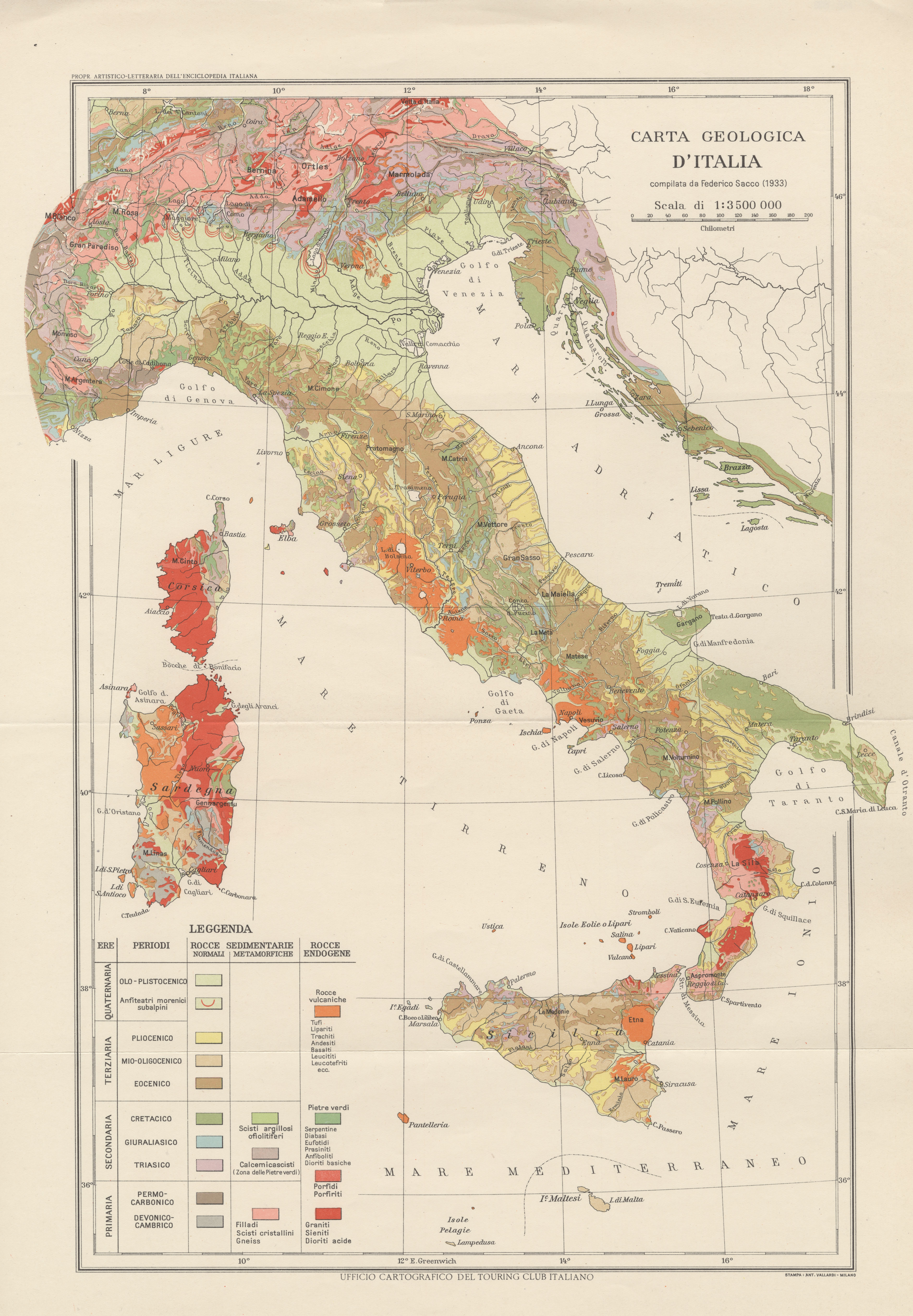
Geological map of Italy

The oldest rocks in Italy may include oceanic crust subducted during the Caledonian orogeny and 440 million year old Ordovician granites. Only detrital zircons in the Alps dates to the Precambrian.

These granites are located offshore of Venice, found in the Agip Assunta well and deformed, transforming into orthogneiss during the Hercynian orogeny. Overall, Italian Paleozoic rocks commonly show evidence of the Hercynian orogeny in the Alps, Sardinia, the Apuan Alps of Tuscany, and the Peloritani mountains of Sicily and Calabria.

The Hercynian orogeny produced a large thrust belt, thickened the crust and led to polyphase metamorphism that yielded rocks such as gneiss, phyllite and amphibolite. Metamorphic facies range from high-pressure kyanite to low-pressure andalusite.

The Western Alps at Mont Blanc and Monte Rosa; the Southern Alps at Baveno, Brixen, Cima d'Asta and Doss del Sabion overlooking Pinzolo; and the Barbagia and Gallura granites in Sardinia; are all examples of Carboniferous and Permian granite pluton and batholith intrusions. Ignimbrite eruptions had an important role at the same time in forming parts of the central Southern Alps. Sedimentary rocks from before the Permian have remained intact and unmetamorphosed (or have experienced only low-grade metamorphism) in the Paleocarnian charn of the eastern Southern Alps. The metamorphic grade increases to the west, reaching amphibolite grade in the Orobic Alps and granulite grade in the Ivrea-Verbano Zone. Most of the basement rocks in the Dolomites are phyllite or gneiss at greenschist grade. Within the Dioritic-Kinzigitic unit, biotite and sillimanite-rich gneiss can be found outcropping in Calabria.

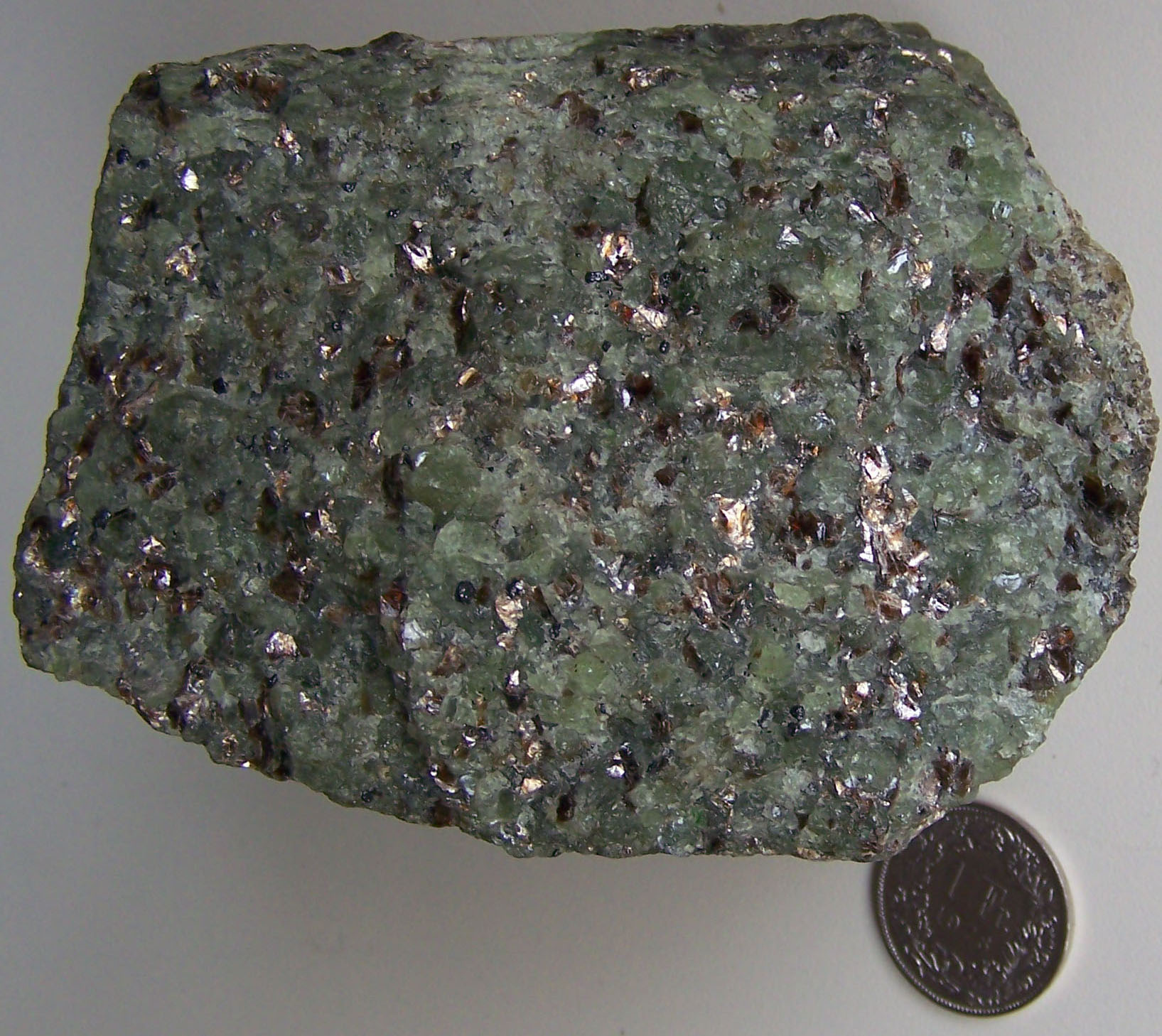
Phlogopite peridotite from the Ivrea zone

At the same time in the Permian and Carboniferous, the opening of the west branch of the Tethys Ocean reoriented sections of Italy atop the Adriatic Plate and created the Ligure-Piemontese ocean basin, leading to widespread deposition of carbonates, evaporites and red beds. Units such as the Valgardena Sandstone were emplaced during a westward marine transgression in areas later uplifted as the Alps. These sandstones were succeeded by sabkha, the lagoonal Bellerophon Formation, volcanic rocks, the Werfen Formation and Servino Formation.

=== Mesozoic (251-66 million years ago) ===
Even in the 19th century, geologists recognized Ladinian and Carnian age carbonate platforms in the Dolomites that likely formed as atolls. Throughout the early Triassic, the Zorzino Limestone, Rhaetian Choncodon Dolomite, Riva di Solto Shale and Zu Limestone formations filled the Lombard Basin. Up to two kilometers of carbonates assembled in the late Triassic as the Dolomia Principale. Meanwhile, the Lagonegro Basin accumulated limestone, chert and marl into the Jurassic. Complex tectonics produced horst and graben features and some lowlands deposited evaporites, such as the Burano Anhydrite—now a significant unit in the Apennine Mountains.

Jurassic tectonic conditions differed somewhat from the Triassic, resulting in new basin formation and a carbonate depositional environment akin to the current day Florida-Bahamas platform. Southern Alps basins such as the Lombard Basin and the Belluno Basin gathered marl and limestone, while turbidite and nodular limestone was more common in the Vajont Limestone, Fonzaso Formation and Selcifero Lombardo. In addition to wide shelf environments similar to those of the Bahamas, seamounts such as the Trento Swell in the Tethys Ocean; the Sicilian Iblean and Saccense zones; and some basins such as the Piemontese Basin, the Lagonegro Basin and the Ligurian-western Tuscan Ligure Basin; were situated above ophiolite and ended up with abundant radiolarite fossils in limestone.

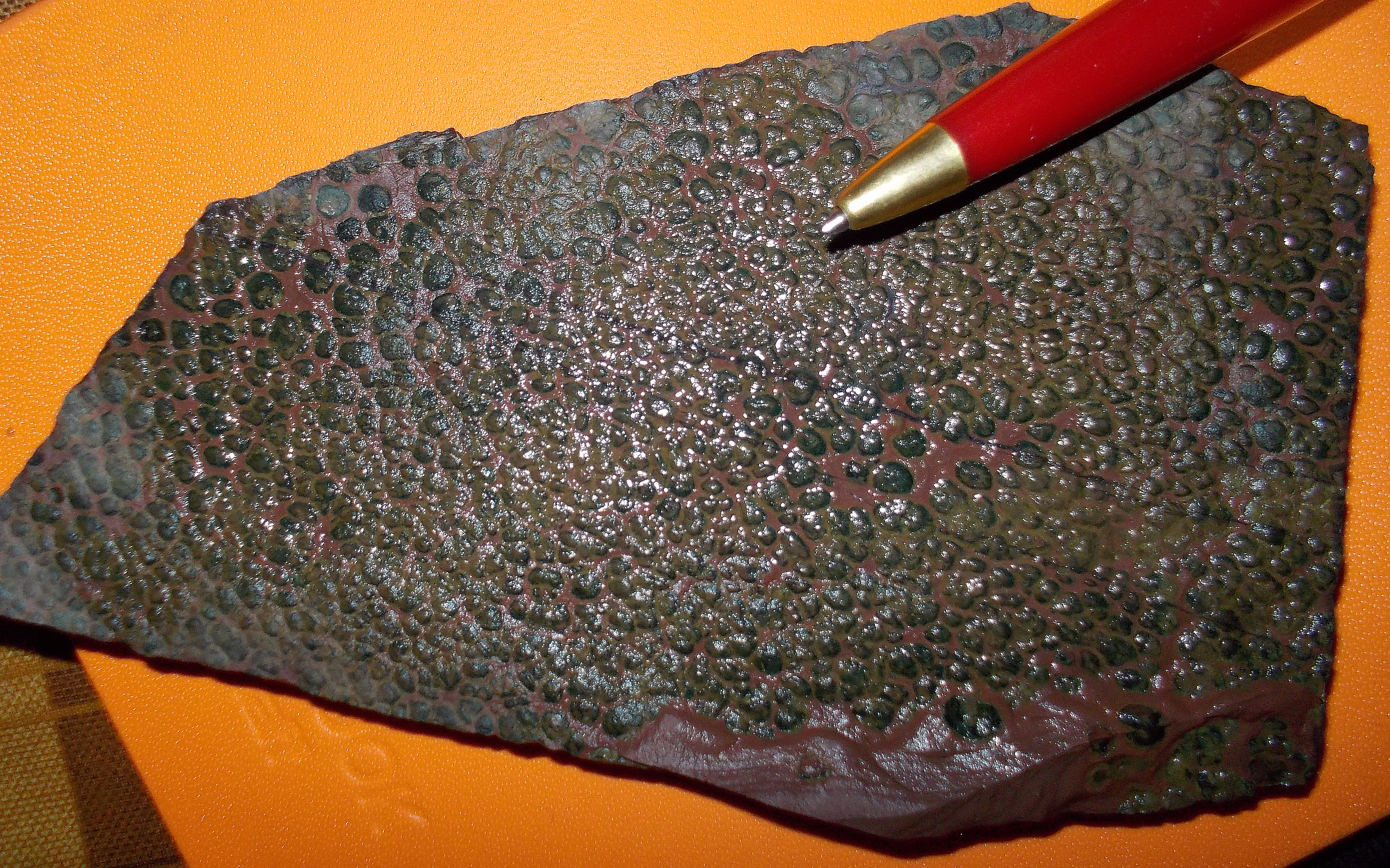
Glauconitic rock of Jurassic age from Lombardy

During the Cretaceous, global high sea levels and local tectonic conditions produced a greater share of basins than platform environments (although the Campano-Lucana, Friuli, Apulia and Latium-Abruzzi platforms persisted). More pelagic, open water sediments such as marl joined breccia and underwater debris flows. Triassic conditions persisted in only one location in Sardinia where up to one kilometer of carbonates finished depositing in the Cretaceous, atop deformed Cambrian-Carboniferous metamorphic basement rock.

Changing interaction between the European Plate and the Adriatic Plate resulted in tectonic compression along the Adriatic Plate's northern margin, kicking off the formation of the Alps and the Apennines. In the late Cretaceous, foredeeps filled with flysch and molasse sediments that were shed off the rising mountains. Examples include the Bergamo Flysch within the Lombard Basin of the Southern Alps.

The Mesozoic was largely quiescent in terms of magmatism, but some igneous activity did take place. Pietra Verde sandstones from the Ladinian in the Southern Alps contain calc-alkaline rock while granite, shoshonite and monzonite intruded the Dolomites region into the Carnian. In fact, subsurface rocks in the Po Valley, the Lagonegro Basin, west Trentino, the Venetian foothills, Sicily, Lombary and the northern Apennines show signs of volcaniclastic sediments and pillow lava from the time period.

Although the oceanic crust of the Tethys Ocean has been recycled into the mantle, sections of it remain as ophiolite with peridotite, gabbro, prasinite, serpentinite and pillow lava of Jurassic to Cretaceous age in Liguria, Tuscany, Val d'Aosta and Piemonte. Petrological research indicates that ophiolites in the Alps are metamorphosed, while those in the Apennines are not. The Ragusa Basin in the Iblean Plateau of Sicily had magmatism in the Jurassic, together with the Trapanese Basin, followed by Cretaceous activity in the Syracuse area.

=== Cenozoic (66 million years ago-present) ===
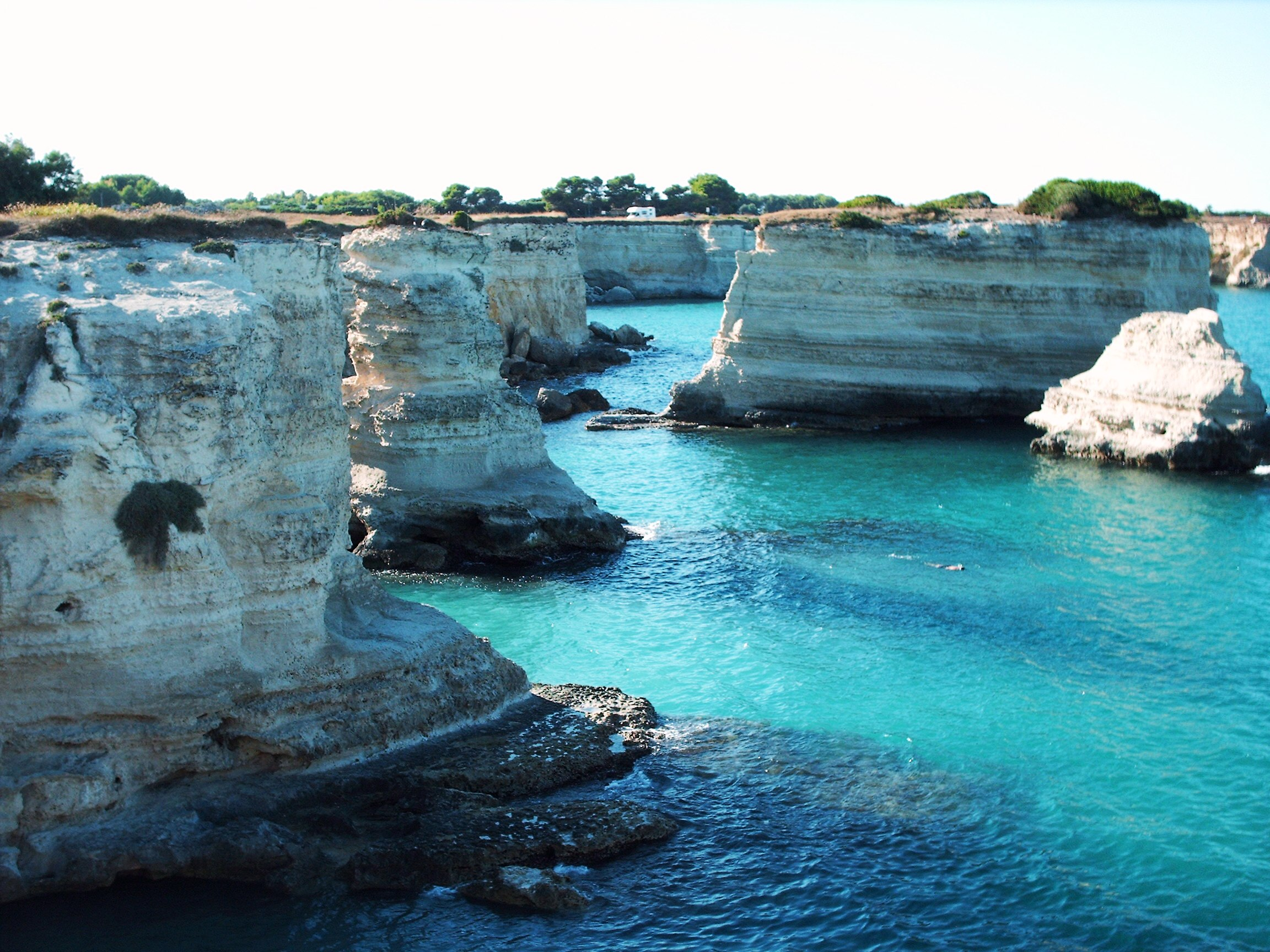
Horizontal layers of Cenozoic sedimentary rocks in the cliffs at Torre Sant'Andrea in Lecce province, southeast Italy

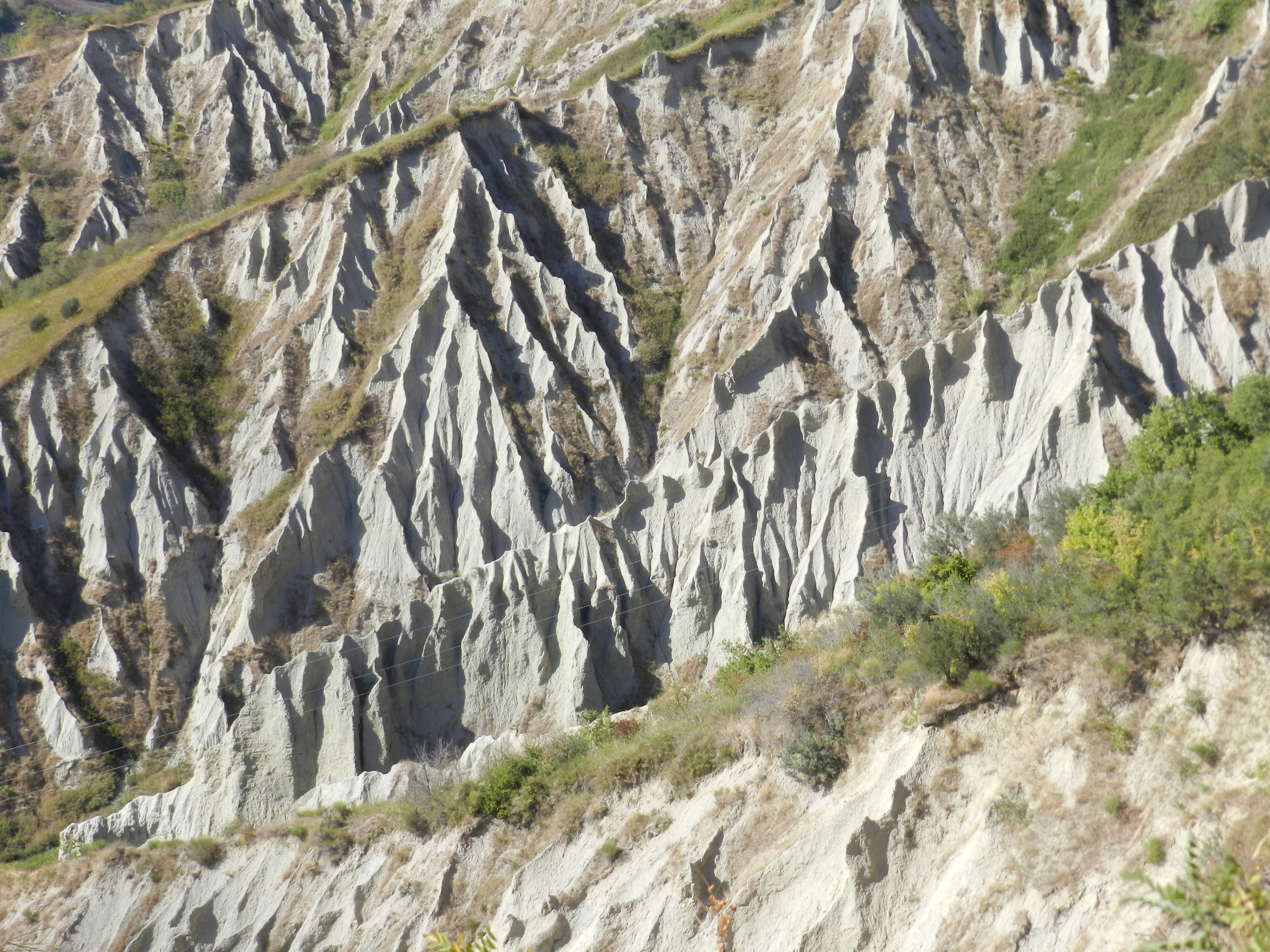
Badlands sediments of Pliocene–Pleistocene age in Atri, Abruzzo

During the Paleocene, the Eurasia-Africa convergent margin driving the Alpine orogeny accompanied the closure of Alpine Tethys ocean basin. As a result, magmatism emplaced in the Periadriatic region lasting into the Oligocene: Basalt dyke intrusions (Dolomites) and volcaniclastic rocks (Lessini Mountains), alongside various batholiths (acid rocks such as trachyte, tonalite and syenite) can be found. The Alpine tectonics affected the magmatic bodies during the uplift: the Insubric Lineament dividing the Southern Alps, for example, sheared the Bregaglia batholith.

Sedimentary processes were affected from the orogeny in form of turbiditic deposits accumulating in nearby basins. In the North-east, Eocene age flysch shed off the Dinaric Alps can be found in the present-day foothills of Friuli region, while shallow water deposition (shale and carbonates) persisted in areas further away from the thrust belt. Paleontological evidences include the fish fossils of Monte Bolca (in the Lessini Mountains, close to Verona on the Po Valley plains inland of Venice).

In the Eocene, the Apennine orogeny started evolving independently from the Alps as a result of a new west-dipping subduction and continental collision between the Corsica-Sardinia block and the Greater Adria microplate. Following the eastward migrating subduction zone, sediments of the Adriatic margin and Ionian Basin accreted onto the Apennine area as a tectonic nappe stacking from the west. As the Adria microplate migrated to the northeast with an anti-clockwise rotation, Apennine foredeeps migrated to the east with continued flysch deposition in younging basins from west to east (the Macigno Formation, the Cervarola Unit, the Marnoso-arenacea Formation and others).

In the Northern Apennines, the Liguride units (oceanic sediments and ophiolites) were deformed and later (during the Oligo-Miocene) thrusted upon the Tuscan and Umbria-Marche Units (passive margin pelagic basins). In Central-Southern Italy, carbonate platforms (the Latium-Abruzzi, the Apulia and others) persisted alongside turbiditic basins (such as the Lagonegro) up until the late Miocene. In the Southern Apennines, like the Liguride Units, flysch units with ophiolite were incorporated in the orogenic arc (Cilento Flysch, Flysch Rosso and Frido Flysch). The deformational history of these units is recorded by their alternating shale, sandstone and conglomerate layers. In Sicily the Maghreb-related Numidian Flysch from the Miocene contains quartz and arenite sands likely deposited by a river delta from Africa and overlain by the coarser Goroglione Flysch.

During the Miocene, the ongoing uplift affected the Alps as well as the Paleo-Apenninic chain, and backarc to foredeep basins continued developing. In the Southern Alps, the Gonfolite Lombarda Group and the Molassa Bellunese started filling the Po basin. Around the Apennines and Sicily, late Miocene evaporites were left by the Messinian salinity crisis (for example, Gessosso-Solfifera Formation). The opening of back-arc basins such as the Thyrrenian Sea caused the Calabro-Peloritan block to be separated from Sardinia, moving further south-east and finally being included in the southern apenninic arc. Uplift continues today – since the Pleistocene, Calabrian sedimentary rocks have uplifted more than one kilometre (1,100 yards).

Pliocene-Quaternary volcanism in Italy occurred with the onset of extensional tectonics of back-arc basins such as the Tyrrhenian Sea: seamount and island arc volcanism developed as well as on-land magmatism in Tuscany, Lazio and Campania, often aligned trending northeast-southwest, followed by the main normal faults of the Apenninic chain. For example, the island of Elba is an exhumed granitic batholith over thinned continental crust, while Stromboli is a stratovolcano originating atop newly formed oceanic crust. The most recent volcanic island is Ferdinandea near Sicily, that emerged with an 1831 offshore eruption but quickly eroded below the water, remaining as the Graham Bank. Historically active volcanoes are sometimes very explosive, for example Vesuvius, while others such as Mount Etna tend toward less explosive basaltic eruptions.

== Natural resource geology ==
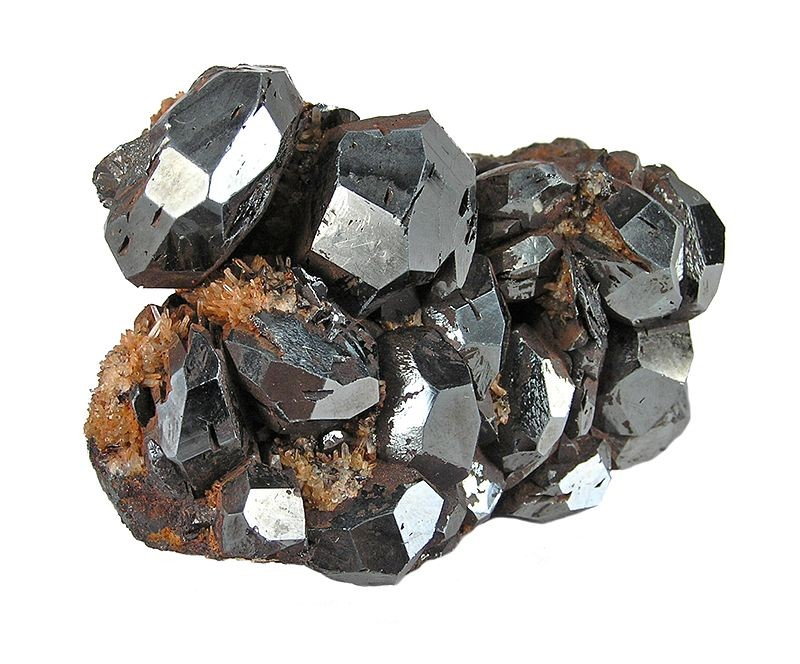
Hematite from Rio Marina iron mine on Elba

Petroleum exploration in Italy began in the late 19th century and resulted in the discovery of the Caviaga gas field close to Milan in 1944. Apennine folding has created structural traps in Pliocene sand reservoirs in the Bradanic Trough, the Adriatic Sea and beneath the Po Plain. In between Brescia and Milan, stratigraphic traps were formed at the base of Pliocene transgressive rocks and then migrated into Neogene clastic rocks that were experiencing more intense tectonic activity. In some places, organic matter in Miocene flysch may have been the original source of hydrocarbons. Flysch-derived gas condensate reservoirs are located off the coasts of eastern Calabria (Crotone) and Trapani in western Sicily; and on land near Gagliano Castelferrato in northeast Sicily.

Liassic and Triassic age carbonates and reservoirs offshore in the south Adriatic or onshore at Irpinia are hosted in Triassic dolomites. Extremely deep production (more than five kilometres (3 miles) deep) takes place east of Milan in the Malossa Field. The eastern Sicilian Gela and Ragusa oil fields are also particularly deep.

In spite of extensive extraction after World War II, Italy still retains oil and gas resources. Production rose from 13.8 million cubic metres (490 million cubic feet) of gas in 1984 and 2.2 million tonnes (2.4 million short tons) of oil to 17.4 billion cubic metres (610 billion cubic feet) and 4.3 million tonnes (4.7 million short tons) of oil by 1991, and new reserves were found in Italy in 1992–1993.

Italy has extensive lignite coal from the Eocene, concentrated in Sardinia. However, extraction is limited by thin seams and complicated tectonics. Graphite anthracite is known in Carboniferous Val d'Aosta rocks and the Permian rocks of Sardinia. Both Calabria and central Italy have peat deposits from the Paleogene.

Because of the extent of mining throughout thousands of years of Italy's history from pre-Roman times to the present, many of the country's generally small mineral deposits have already been depleted. The country has small deposits of lead, sulfur, copper, zinc, silver, fluorite, barite, strontium, aluminum, gold, beryl, molybdenum, tin, uranium, iron, cobalt, chromium, titanium, mercury and astatine. Quartz, salt, feldspar, asbestos, talc, magnesite, graphite, leucite, bentonite and perlite are all extracted for industrial purposes. Historically, Italy had silver-zinc-lead mines on Monte Neve, at Raibl (in the Eastern Alps), and on Sardinia; mercury mining on Monte Amiata, Tuscany; fluorite and antimony mines in Sardinia; and pyrite mining in Tuscany. Elba, Cogne in the Val d'Aosta valley and the Nurra Province of Sardinia all had historical iron mining. Sardinia also produced bauxite, the Western Alps asbestos and talc, Liguria and Sardinia manganese, nickel in Piemonte and copper in Val d'Aosta.

Sicily remains active as a producer of sulfur and potassium salts and aluminum production has shifted into leucitic lavas in the center of the country.

== See also ==
- Siculo-Calabrian rift
