= Vulcano =

Active volcanic island off the northern coast of Sicily, Italy

Native name: Isola di Vulcano
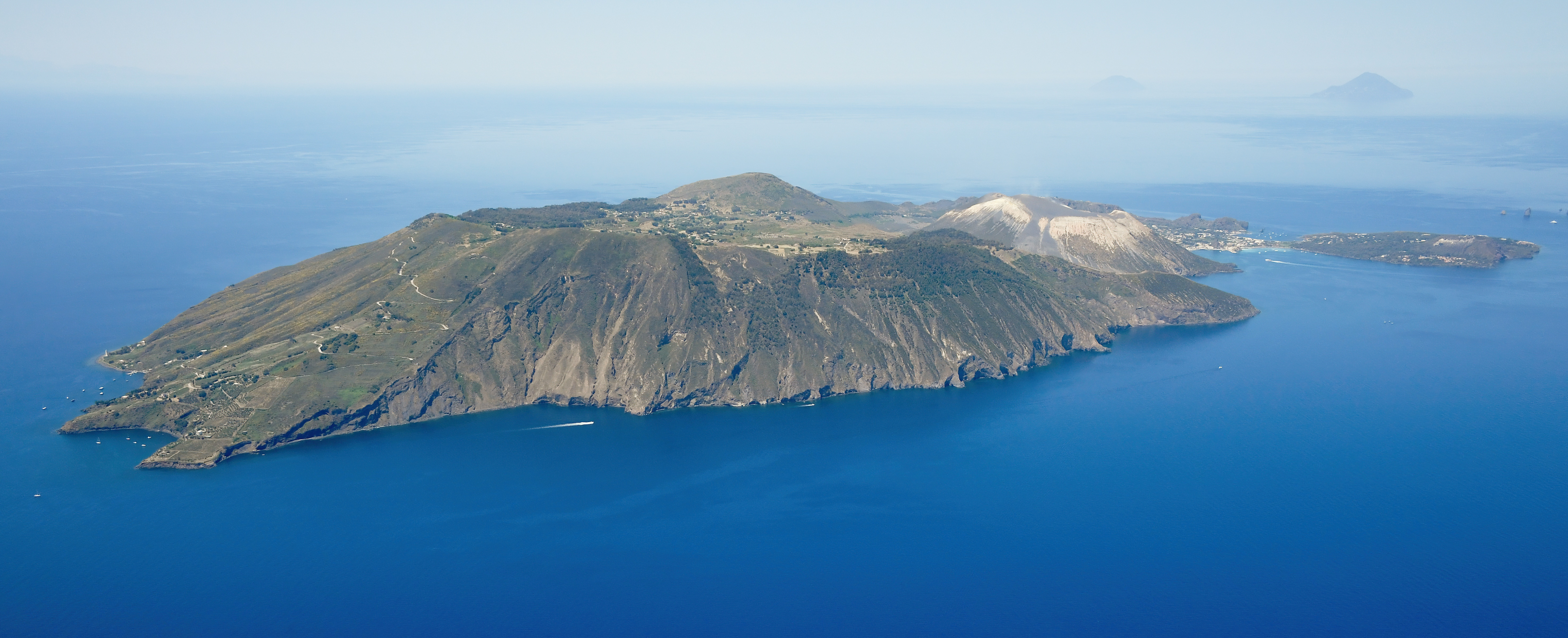
- Aerial view of Vulcano from the east

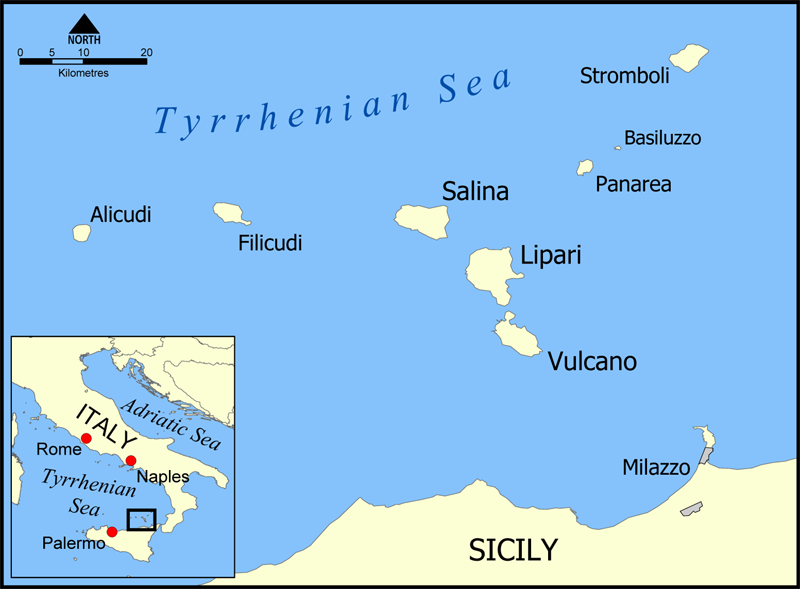
- Vulcano and the Aeolian Islands

Geography
- Location: Tyrrhenian Sea
- Coordinates: 38°23′58″N 14°57′50″E
- Archipelago: Aeolian Islands
- Area: 21 km^{2} (8.1 sq mi)
- Length: 8 km (5 mi)
- Width: 4 km (2.5 mi)
- Highest elevation: 501 m (1644 ft)

Administration
- Italy
- Region: Sicily
- Province: Metropolitan City of Messina
- Commune: Lipari

Demographics
- Population: 450 (2019)

Vulcano (Sicilian: Vurcanu) or Vulcan is a small volcanic island belonging to Italy in the Tyrrhenian Sea, about 20 km (12 mi) north of Sicily and located at the southernmost end of the seven Aeolian Islands. The island is known for its volcanic activity and contains several volcanic calderas, including one of the four active volcanoes in Italy that are not submarine. The English word "volcano" and its equivalents in several European languages derive from the name of this island. The name derives from the Roman belief that the tiny island was the chimney of Vulcan, the Roman god of fire. In November 2021, 150 people were evacuated from the island's harbour area due to increased volcanic activity and gases; an amber alert had been issued in October 2021 after several significant changes in the volcano's parameters. In the fall of 2025, volcanic unrest increased again with strong gas emissions reported on October 15, 2025.

== Geography ==
Vulcano is located approximately 20 km (12 mi) north of Sicily and is approximately 8 km (5 mi) long by 4 km (2 mi) wide. The island is 21 km^{2} (8 sq mi) in area and rises to 501 m (1,644 ft) above sea level. The island is separated by a 750 m (2,461 ft)-wide strait from Lipari to the north and is administratively part of the Commune of Lipari.

As of 2019, Vulcano had a population of 450 residents, a decrease from a population of 953 in 2011. The majority of the population resides in Vulcano Porto on the north side of the island, with secondary population centres at Vulcano Piano and Vulcanello.

== Geology ==
Vulcano

Highest point
- Elevation: 501 m (1,644 ft)
- Prominence: 501 m (1,644 ft)

Geography
- Location: Aeolian Islands, Italy

Geology
- Mountain type: Complex stratovolcanoes
- Last eruption: 1888 to 1890

Alternating views of fumaroles

Volcanic activity in the region is largely the result of the African Plate subducting under the Eurasian Plate.

There are three volcanic centres on the island:

- At the southern end of the island are old stratovolcano cones, Monte Aria (501 m (1,644 ft)), Monte Saraceno (481 m (1,578 ft)), and Monte Luccia (188 m (617 ft)), which have partially collapsed into the Il Piano Caldera.
- The most recently active centre is the Gran Cratere at the top of the Fossa cone, the cone having grown in the Lentia Caldera in the middle of the island, and has had at least nine major eruptions in the last 6,000 years.
- At the north of the island is the islet, Vulcanello (123 m (404 ft)), connected to Vulcano by an isthmus that may be flooded in bad weather. It emerged from the sea during an eruption in 183 BCE, as a separate islet. Occasional eruptions from its three cones with both pyroclastic flow deposits and lavas occurred from then until 1550, with the last eruption creating a narrow isthmus connecting it to Vulcano.

Vulcano has had no eruptions since the eruption of the Fossa cone on 2 August 1888 to 22 March 1890, which deposited about 5 m (16 ft) of pyroclastic material on the summit. The style of eruption seen on the Fossa cone is called a Vulcanian eruption, being the explosive emission of pyroclastic fragments of viscous magmas caused by the high viscosity preventing gases from escaping easily. This eruption of Vulcano was carefully documented at the time by Giuseppe Mercalli. Mercalli described the eruptions as "...explosions sounding like a cannon at irregular intervals..." As a result, vulcanian eruptions are based on his description. A typical vulcanian eruption can hurl blocks of solid material several hundreds of metres from the vent. Mercalli reported that blocks from the 1888–1890 eruption fell into the sea between Vulcano and neighboring Lipari, and several that had fallen on the island of Vulcano were photographed by him or his assistants.

Volcanic gas emissions from this volcano are measured by a multicomponent gas analyzer system, which detects degassing of rising magmas before an eruption, improving prediction of volcanic activity.

A survey on local groundwater from 1995 to 1997 found temperatures of 49–75 °C, sodium sulfate -chloride chemical composition, and near neutral pH in the water wells closest to the slopes of the volcanic cone. This is mainly due to condensation onto the slopes of the volcanic cone and water-rock interaction buffering.

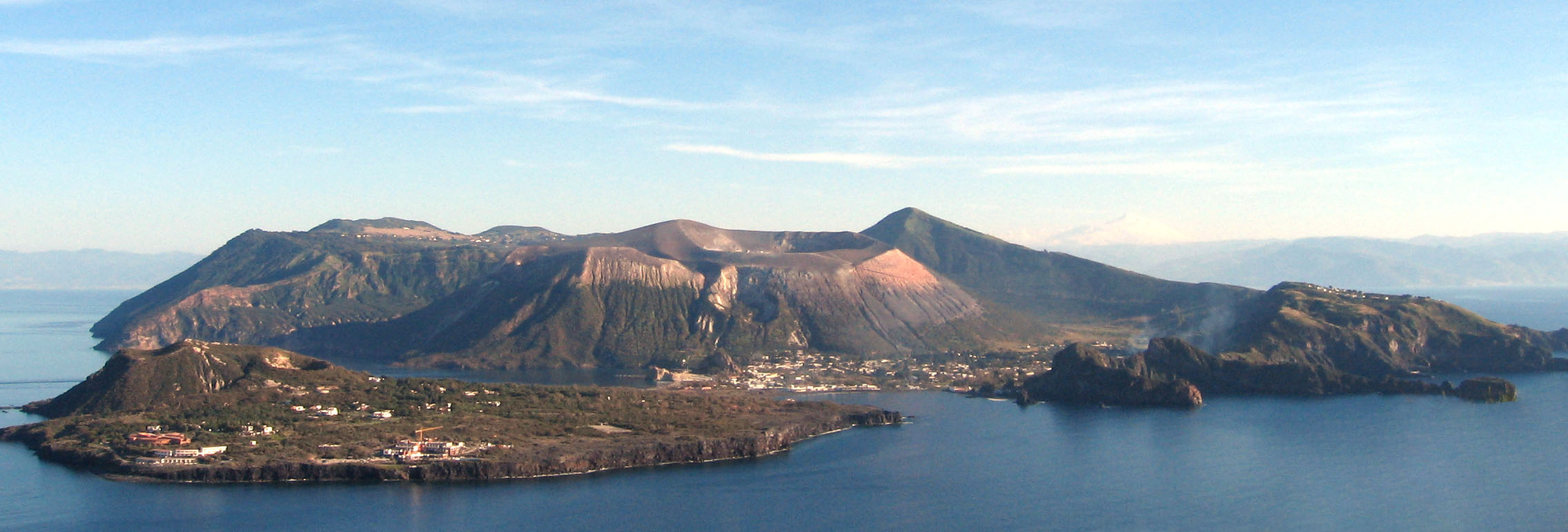
View from the island of Lipari of the northern profile of Vulcano on which the low Fossa cone is visible (center), the green islet in the foreground is Vulcanello and the isthmus connecting Vulcanello to Vulcano is barely visible

== Microbiology ==
Since Vulcano island has volcanic activity, it is a place where thermophiles and hyperthermophiles are found. The hyperthermophilic archaean Pyrococcus furiosus was described for the first time when it was isolated from sediments of this island.

== History ==
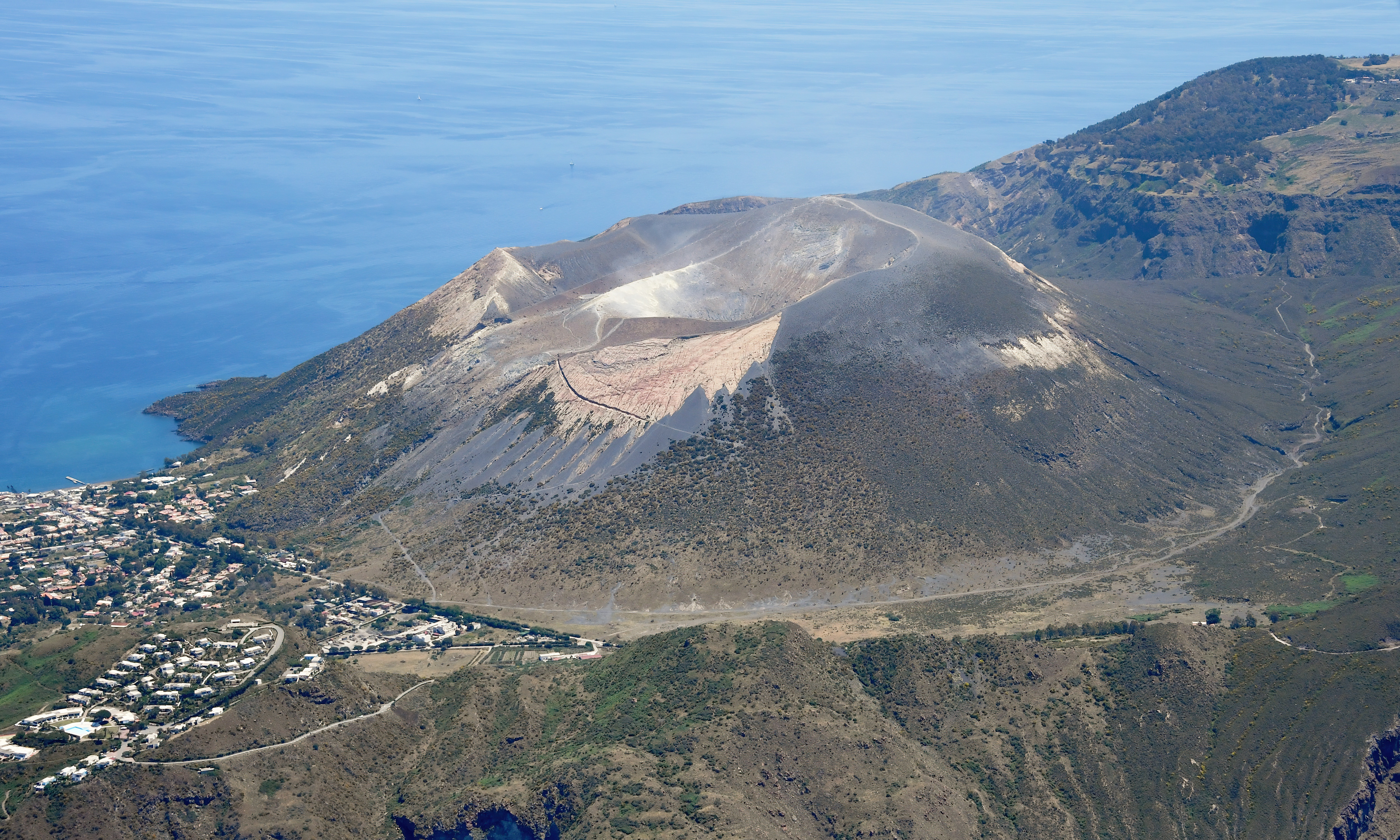
Aerial view of the Fossa cone

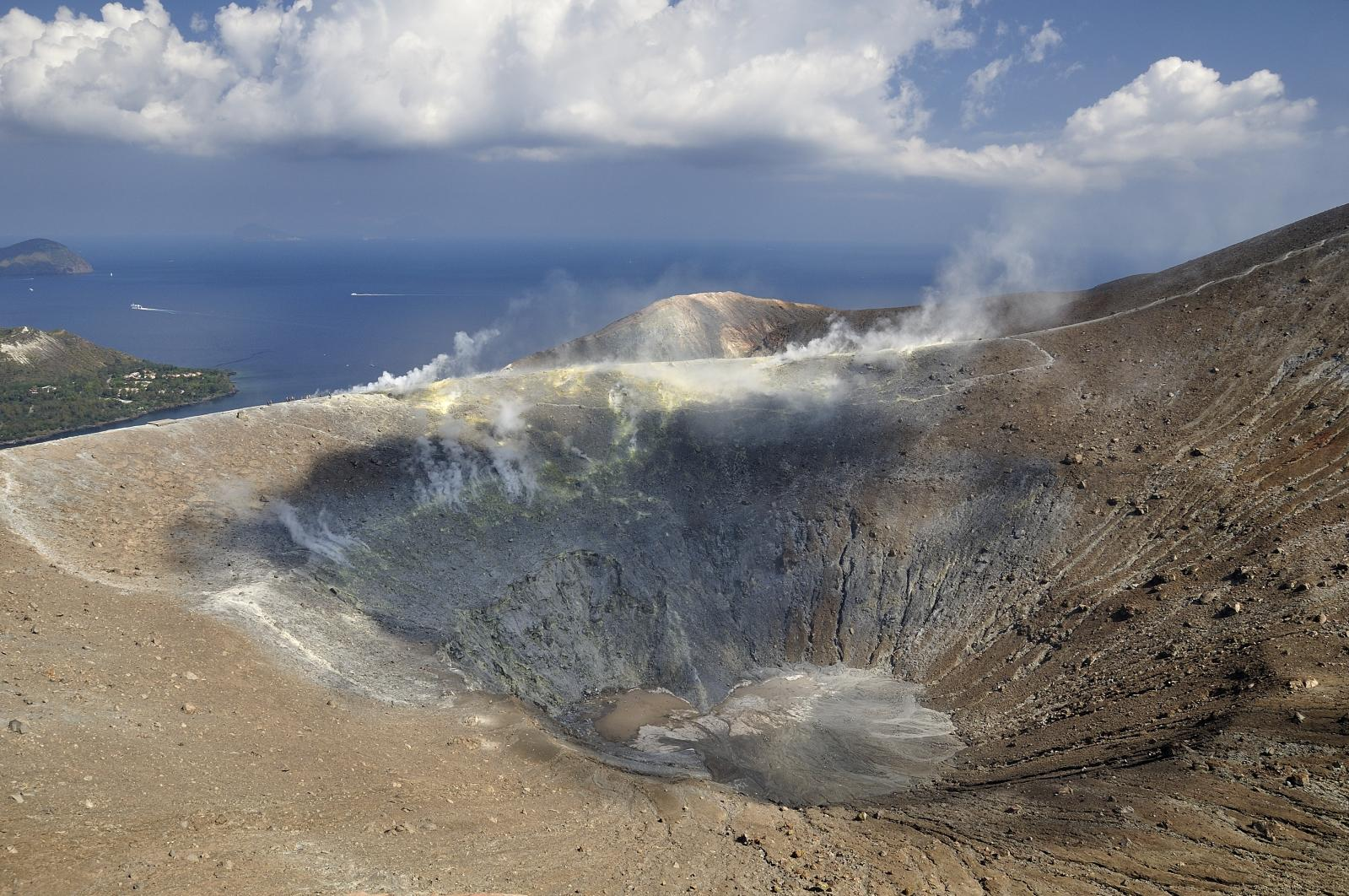
The Gran Cratere

=== Classical period ===
The Ancient Greeks named this island Therasía (Θηρασία) and Thérmessa (Θέρμεσσα, source of heat). The island appeared in their myths as the private foundry of the Olympian god Hephaestus, the patron of blacksmiths. Their myths noted two more of his foundries, at Etna and Olympus. Strabo also mentions Thermessa as sacred place of Hephaestus (ἱερὰ Ἡφαίστου), but it is not certain whether this was a third name for the island, or merely an adjective.

Similarly, the Romans believed that Vulcano was the chimney of their god Vulcan's workshop and, therefore, named the island after him. According to the Roman myths, the island had grown due to his periodic clearing of cinders and ashes from his forge. They also explained earthquakes that either preceded or accompanied the explosions of ash as being due to Vulcan making weapons for their god Mars for his armies to wage war.

The Romans used the island mainly for raw materials, harvesting timber, and mining alum and sulfur. These were the principal activities on the island until the end of the nineteenth century.

=== Medieval ===
The first ascent of the volcanic cone is documented for the 13th century. The Dominican friar Burchard of Mount Sion, in his pilgrimage report to the Holy Land, tells of his return journey via Sicily, which probably took place in 1284. On Vulcano he had climbed the summit "crawling on his hands and feet". His ascent can be considered authentic, as he reports in detail on his observations of the landscape and nature, for example describing the fumaroles or the diameter of the crater.

The island of Vulcano as well as the Aeolian Islands are already known to Isidor of Seville, the Gallic bishop Arculf, who dictated his journey to the Holy Land to the Irishman Adomnan (before 680), or Bartholomew Anglicus. They are an integral part of medieval knowledge of the geography of the Mediterranean, but none of them wrote about Vulcano on their own initiative.

Vulcano is also mentioned in the pilgrimage report (ca. 1350) by Ludolf von Sudheim, who, however, claims that he did not dare to climb it. Unlike Burchard of Mount Sion, Ludolf expected to find the entrance to hell at the crater. The Provençal knight Antoine de La Sale tells of an excursion to the island in 1406. His text is a didactic textbook for his pupil John of Calabria, the son of Duke Rene I of Anjou.

=== Modern period ===
After Bourbon rule collapsed in 1860, the Scottish industrialist and philanthropist James Stevenson bought the northern part of the island. He then built a villa, reopened the local mines, and planted vineyards for making Malmsey wine. Stevenson lived on Vulcano until the last major eruption on the island, in 1888. This eruption lasted the better part of two years, by which time Stevenson had sold all of his property to the local populace. He never returned to the island. His villa is still intact.

== Cultural significance ==
American attorney and writer Richard Paul Roe asserts that the play The Tempest by William Shakespeare is set on the island of Vulcano, rather than the more authoritative interpretation that the setting was based on reports about Bermuda in the Americas because of the hurricane.

An asteroid is named after this island, 4464 Vulcano.

== See also ==
- Fumarole mineral
- List of volcanoes in Italy
- List of islands of Italy
- Vulcano (Sicily)

== Sources ==
- Ezio Giunta, dir. (2005). "Vulcano". Estateolie 2005 the Essential Guide (English Version of Tourist Guidebook): 80–87.
- "Vulcano". Global Volcanism Program. Smithsonian Institution.
