= Graham Island (Mediterranean Sea) =

Submerged volcanic island south of Sicily

Graham Island Isola Ferdinandea (Italian) Ile Julia (French)
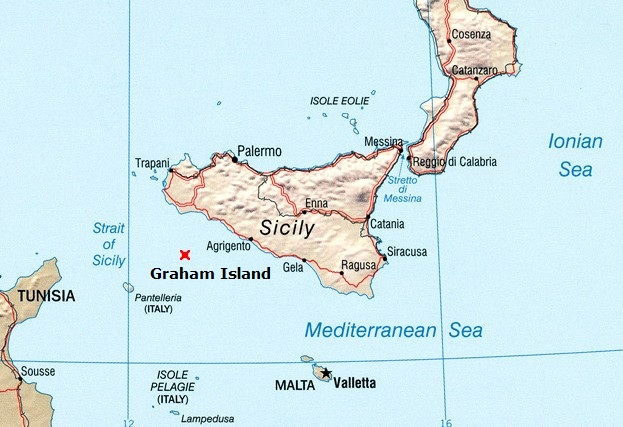
- Approximate location of Graham Island
- Approximate location of Graham Island
- Summit depth: Roughly 8 m (26 ft)
- Height: 63 m (207 ft) (maximum)
- Summit area: Campi Flegrei del Mar di Sicilia (Phlegraean Fields of the Sea of Sicily)

Location
- Location: Between Sicily and Tunisia
- Coordinates: 37°10′N 12°43′E

Geology
- Type: Volcanic island
- Last eruption: 1863

Graham Island (Italian: Isola Ferdinandea; French: Île Julia) is a submerged volcanic island in the Mediterranean Sea near Sicily. It forms the tip of the submarine volcano Empedocles, 30 km (19 mi) south of Sicily, which is one of a number of underwater volcanoes known as the Campi Flegrei del Mar di Sicilia.

The island has emerged from sea level four times in recorded history. Seamount eruptions have raised it from the surface before erosion submerged it again. The last prominent appearance occurred in July 1831, when the island emerged above sea level for six months. During that time, a four-way dispute over the island's sovereignty arose, which remained unresolved.

The island is still referenced on marine charts, as its top is only 6 metres (20 feet) short of breaking the surface; it thus becomes a potentially dangerous hidden obstacle for many seafaring vessels, whose keels most often run deeper than this. It is also a small shoal on which near-surface maritime creatures dwell.

== History ==
=== Early history ===
Volcanic activity at Graham Island was first recorded during the First Punic War during the 3rd century BC. The island has appeared and disappeared four or five times since then. Several eruptions have been reported since the 17th century AD. The island is located in a volcanic area known as the Campi Flegrei del Mar di Sicilia (Phlegraean Fields of the Sea of Sicily), in between Sicily and Tunisia in the Mediterranean Sea. Many submarine volcanoes (seamounts) exist in the region, as well as some volcanic islands such as Pantelleria.

=== 1831 appearance ===
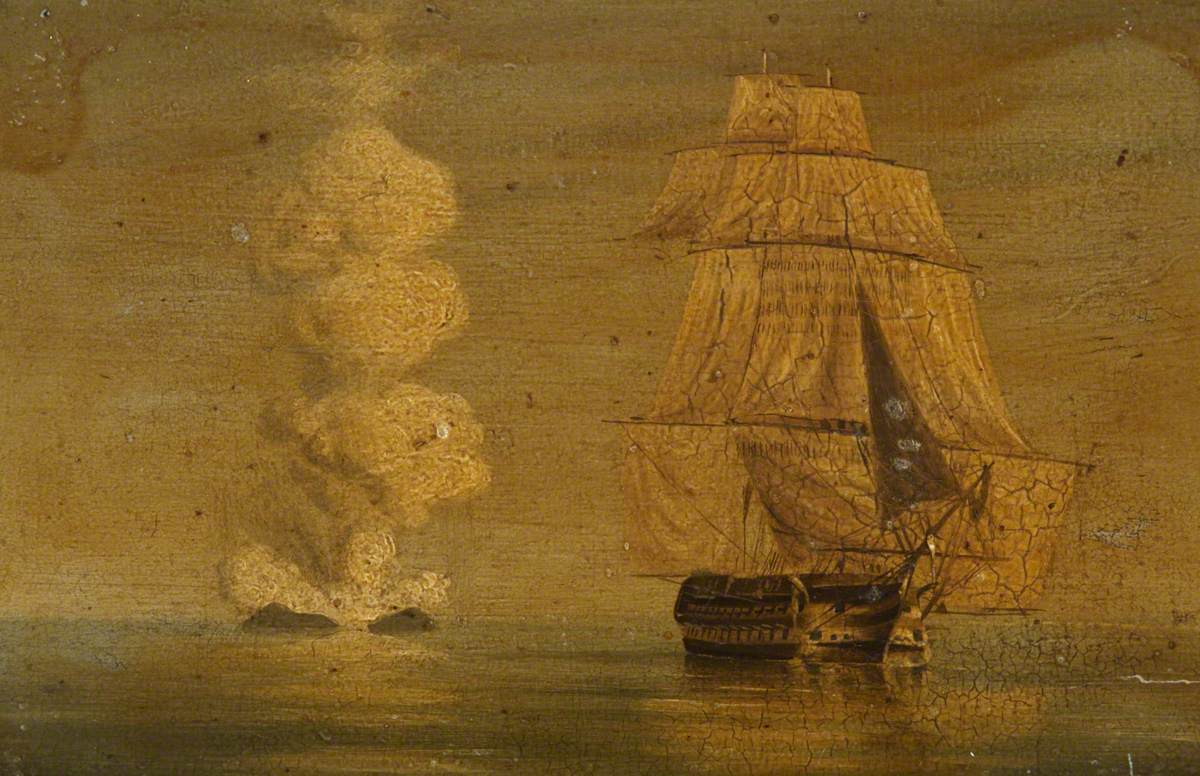
Graham Island guarded by HMS Melville

Graham Island's most recent appearance as an island was in July 1831. The first reports of high seismic activity and/or eruptions occurred during a period spanning from 28 June to 10 July 1831. These reports came from the nearby town of Sciacca. On 28 June, the Royal Navy ships Britannia and Rapid were shaken by an earthquake between Sciacca and Pantelleria. On 4 July, an odour of sulfur spread through the town reportedly in such quantities that it blackened silver. On 12 July, Ferdinando Caronna, captain of the Psyche from Naples, reported seeing smoke coming out of the sea. On 13 July, a column of smoke was clearly seen from St. Domenico. The residents believed it to be a ferry on fire. On the same day, the brig Gustavo passed through the area, confirming a bubbling in the sea that the captain thought was a sea monster. Another ship reported dead fish floating in the water.

By 17 July, a fully grown islet had formed enough to where Sicilian customs official Michele Fiorini was able to land there and to claim the island for the Kingdom of Sicily. He planted an oar there to claim the newly emerged island for the Kingdom of the Two Sicilies.

The eruptions of 1831 resulted in the island increasing in size to about four square kilometres (1 1/2 sq mi). At its maximum (in July and August 1831), it was 4,800 m (15,700 ft) in circumference and 63 m (207 ft) in height. It sported two small lakes, the larger of which was 20 metres (66 ft) in circumference and 2 m (6 ft 7 in) in depth.

In the months ahead, Graham Island eventually became the subject of a four-way dispute over its sovereignty:

- On 2 August 1831, Humphrey Fleming Senhouse, the captain of the first rate Royal Navy ship of the line HMS St Vincent claimed the island for the British Crown and named it after Sir James Graham, the First Lord of the Admiralty, and planted their flag, the Union Jack. Although still only a couple of rocks, the Royal Navy thought it was very suitable as a base to control the traffic in the Mediterranean, as it was closer to the European continent than the island of Malta, a Crown Colony.
- Ferdinand, the ruler of the Two Sicilies, also realized its strategic significance, and dispatched the corvette Etna to claim the new land and dub it Ferdinandea in honour of King Ferdinand II. Nobles of the House of Bourbon reportedly planned to set up a holiday resort on its beaches.
- Spain also declared its territorial ambitions.
- Last on the scene was Constant Prévost, a co-founder of the French Geological Society, who compared the eruption to a bottle of champagne being uncorked. He named the island Julia, because it was born in July, and probably also in reference to France's July Monarchy.

Diplomatic disputes over the island's status ensued. Some observers at the time wondered if a chain of mountains would spring up, linking Sicily to Tunisia and thus upsetting the geopolitics of the region. During the island's brief lifespan tourists began to travel to the island to see its two small lakes.

None of these ideas came to fruition, however, as the island soon sank back beneath the waters. The island was composed of loose tephra, easily eroded by wave action, and when the eruptive episode ended it rapidly subsided, disappearing beneath the waves in January 1832, before the issue of its sovereignty could be resolved. By 17 December 1831, officials reported no trace of it. As dynamically as the seamount appeared, it disappeared, defusing the conflict with it.

In August 1831, observers around the world reported a discolored sun in the sky, tinted blue, purple, or green. Researchers have attempted to discover what volcanic activity was responsible for the stratospheric discharge that caused the discoloration, with an early consensus that Babuyan Claro in the Philippines was the most likely source. Yet, later research has concluded there was no 1831 eruption at Babuyan Claro, and some have argued the smaller activity at Graham was the likely culprit. Even later research ruled out a larger 1831 eruption of the Zavaritski Caldera, as the phenomenon predominated in a limited geographic range and lasted only a month. Nat Turner, an enslaved preacher in Southampton County, Virginia, took the bluish-green sun as a divine sign to begin what became known as Nat Turner's slave rebellion.

=== Recent seismic activity ===
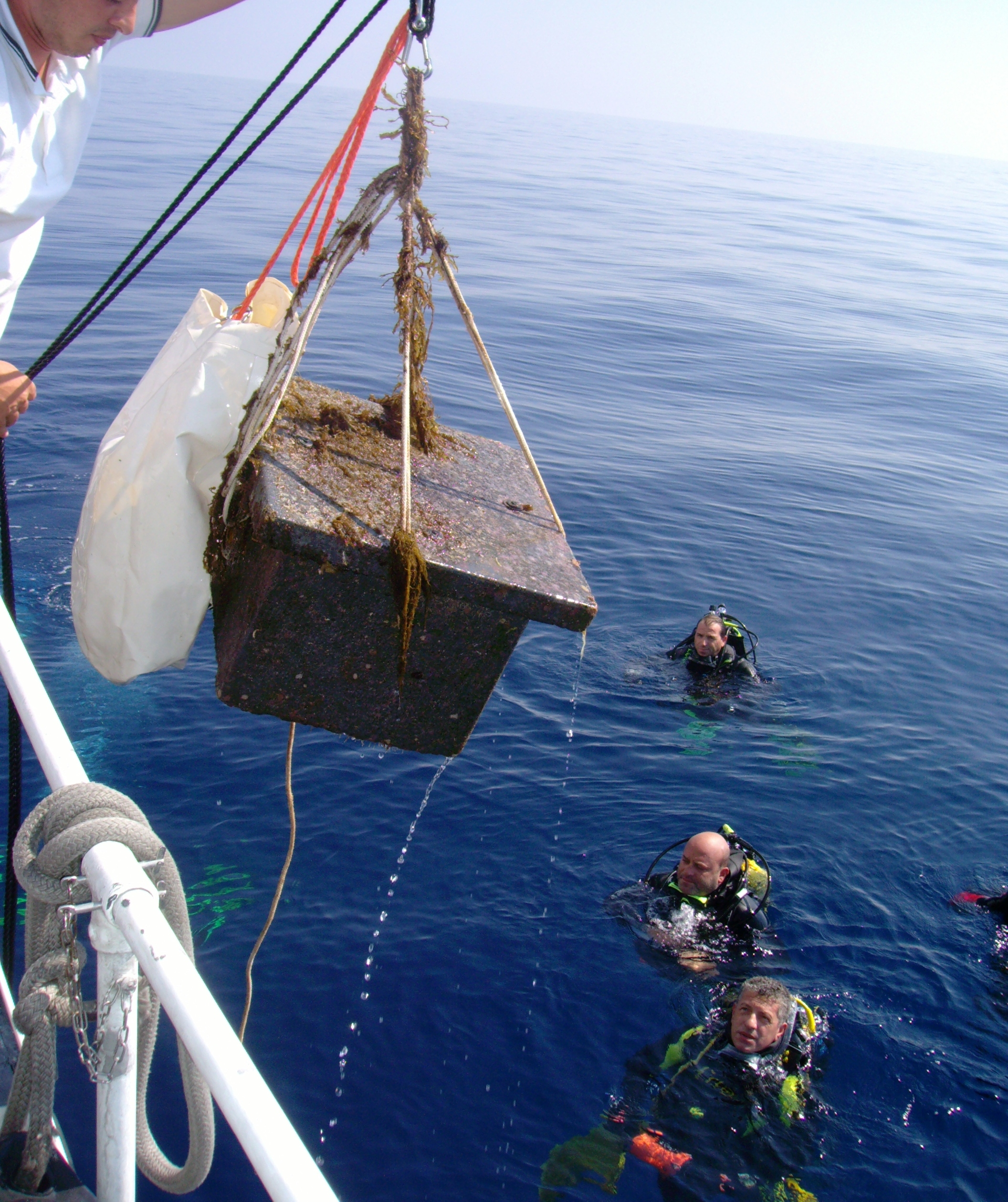
A seismograph, placed on the former island in 2006, is recovered in 2007

Fresh eruptions in 1863 caused the island to reappear briefly before again sinking below sea level. After 1863, the volcano lay dormant for many decades, its summit just 8 m (26 ft) below sea level.

In 2000, renewed seismic activity around Graham Island led volcanologists to speculate that a new eruptive episode could be imminent, and the seamount might once again become an island. In November 2002 the Institute of Geophysics and Volcanology in Rome observed minor seismic activity and gas emissions. They put the time of resurfacing at a couple of weeks or months. Italian sailors put an Italian flag on the top of the bank to avoid other nations' claims if the former island resurfaced. Despite showing signs in both 2000 and 2002, the seismicity did not lead to volcanic eruptions and as of 2000 Graham's summit remains about 8 metres (26 ft) below sea level.

To forestall a renewal of the sovereignty disputes, in November 2000 Italian divers planted a Sicilian flag on the top of the volcano in advance of its expected resurfacing. In a ceremony attended by Prince Carlo, Duke of Castro (a descendent of Ferdinand II) and his wife Princess Camilla, a marble plaque was lowered into the water, with Prince Carlo proclaiming that the island "will always be Sicilian". The marble plaque, weighing 150 kg (330 lb), was inscribed "This piece of land, once Ferdinandea, belonged and shall always belong to the Sicilian people." Within six months, the plaque had fractured into twelve pieces.

== Scientific study ==
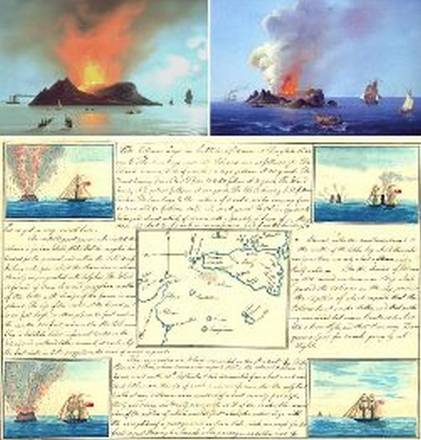
A page out of the field journal of French geologist Constant Prévost. Illustrations by a French artist.

The sudden geologic phenomenon was observed and studied by numerous scientists. Among the Germans were Hoffmann, Schultz, and Philippi. Among the English were Edward Davy and Warington Wilkinson Smyth. Among the French was Constant Prévost, who visited the island with an artist, and presented his findings in the Bulletin de la Société Géologique de France. Among the Italians was Scinà Domenico (1765–1837) who published his observations in the "Effeméridi Sicilians" (1832, vol. 2), and Carlo Gemmellaro (1787–1866), teacher of geology and mineralogy at Catania University, who published "Actions of the Gioenia Academy of Catania" (1831, vol.8). In 2006, further study revealed Graham Island to be just one part of the larger volcanic cone Empedocles.

== In popular culture ==
During its emergence it was visited by Sir Walter Scott, and it provided inspiration for James Fenimore Cooper's The Crater, or Vulcan's Peak, Alexandre Dumas, père's The Speronara, Jules Verne's Captain Antifer and The Survivors of the Chancellor and Terry Pratchett's Jingo.

A number of Cinderella stamps and art coins have been issued over the years, under fictional names such as Poste Isola Ferdinandea.

In 2000, an unofficial minting of a penny was produced by a Sicilian artist, featuring the former island on one side and, unusually, a bust of Elizabeth II on the other. David Mannucci, the designer of the coin, had the idea to produce it after he "found out the existence of the ghost island" from a newspaper article. Besides the copper piece, he minted varieties in silver, copper "with protective enamel", and in silver "with protective enamel". While this Italian-made coin fittingly bears the Italian name for the former island, the art coin also features a bust of "Elizabeth II D.G.R." and bears a British denomination.

== See also ==
- List of islands of Italy
- List of volcanoes in Italy
- Campi Flegrei del Mar di Sicilia
- Volcanism of Italy
- Sabrina Island (Azores), an earlier volcanic island and diplomatic incident analogous to that of Graham Island
- Malta Escarpment
- Palinuro Seamount
- Calypso Deep
- Hellenic Trench
- Mediterranean Ridge
- Eratosthenes Seamount
