= Campi Flegrei Mar Sicilia =

Field of submarine volcanoes near Sicily, Italy

Coordinates: 37.1°N 12.7°E

Campi Flegrei del Mar di Sicilia is a field of submarine volcanoes located south-west of Sicily. It includes the vent of Ferdinandea, otherwise known as Graham Island, which erupted and emerged above sea level in 1831, and encompasses a larger volcano known as Empedocles. The last recorded eruption was in 1867, from a vent named Pinne. There was mild seismic unrest at Ferdinandea in 2000–2002. At its highest, Campi Flegrei comes to 8 meters (26 feet) below sea level.

== See also ==
- List of volcanoes in Italy
- Malta Escarpment
- Palinuro Seamount
- Calypso Deep
- Hellenic Trench
- Mediterranean Ridge
- Eratosthenes Seamount
