= Empedocles (disambiguation) =

Empedocles was a Greek pre-Socratic philosopher and a citizen of Agrigentum.

Empedocles may also refer to:

- 6152 Empedocles, a main-belt asteroid
- Empedocles (bug), a genus of bugs in the family Coreidae
- Empedocles (volcano), a large underwater volcano
- "Empedocles" (The X-Files), an episode of The X-Files
