= Eratosthenes Seamount =

Seamount in the Mediterranean, south of Cyprus

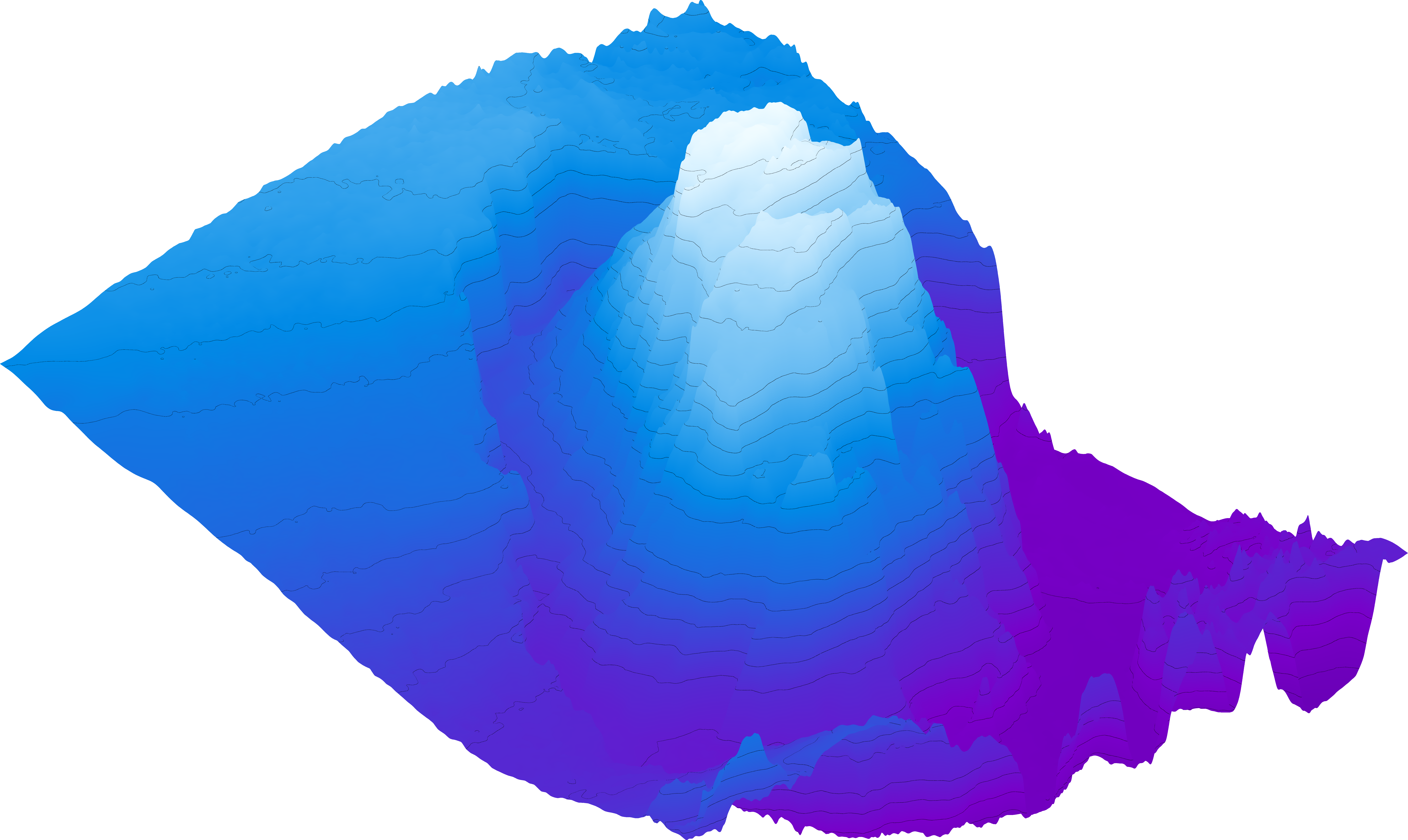
- 3D map of Erasosthenes Seamount

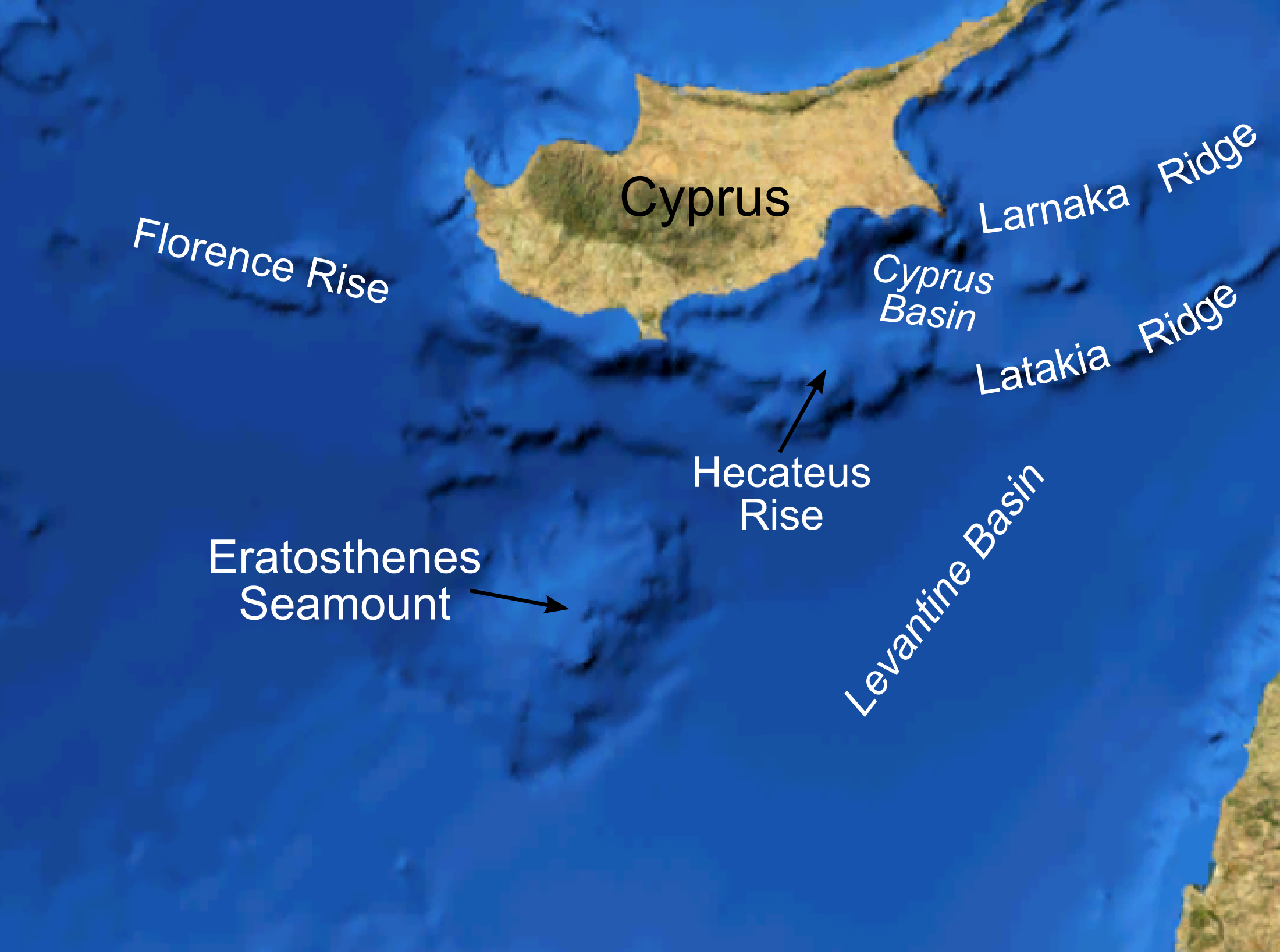
- Bathymetric features south of Cyprus
- Bathymetric features south of Cyprus
- Summit depth: 690 m (2,264 ft)
- Height: 2,000 m (6,562 ft)
- Summit area: 120 km × 80 km (75 mi × 50 mi)

Location
- Location: Eastern Mediterranean
- Group: Herodotus Abyssal Plain
- Country: 33°40′N 32°40′E

Geology
- Type: Seamount (continental fragment)

The Eratosthenes Seamount or Eratosthenes Tablemount is a seamount in the Eastern Mediterranean, in the Levantine basin about 100 kilometres (60 mi) south of western Cyprus. Unlike most seamounts, it is a carbonate platform, not a volcano. It is a large, submerged massif, about 120 by 80 kilometres (75 by 50 mi). Its peak lies at the depth of 690 metres (2,300 ft) and it rises 2,000 metres (6,600 ft) above the surrounding seafloor, which is located at the depth of up to 2,700 metres (8,900 ft) and is a part of the Herodotus Abyssal Plain. It is one of the largest features on the Eastern Mediterranean seafloor.

In 2010 and 2012 the Ocean Exploration Trust's vessel EV Nautilus explored the seamount looking for shipwrecks. Three were found; two were Ottoman vessels from the 19th century and the third was from the 4th century BC. Such seamounts are considered to be ideal for the preservation of shipwrecks because at depths of around 600 metres (2,000 ft) the areas are not disturbed by trawlers or by sediments coming off land.

== Oceanography ==
The Cyprus eddy is a sustained mesoscale eddy with a diameter about 100 kilometres (62 mi), regularly appearing above Eratosthenes Seamount. It was surveyed by oceanographic cruises notably in 1995, 2000, 2001 and 2009.

== Geology ==
During the Messinian crisis, as the sea level in the Mediterranean dropped by about 1,500 metres (4,900 ft), the seamount emerged.

== See also ==
- CenSeam
- Ferdinandea
- Eratosthenes (crater)
- Malta Escarpment
- Campi Flegrei del Mar di Sicilia
- Palinuro Seamount
- Calypso Deep
- Hellenic Trench
- Mediterranean Ridge
