= Johann-Rudolf Marcuard =

Swiss banker (1721–1795)

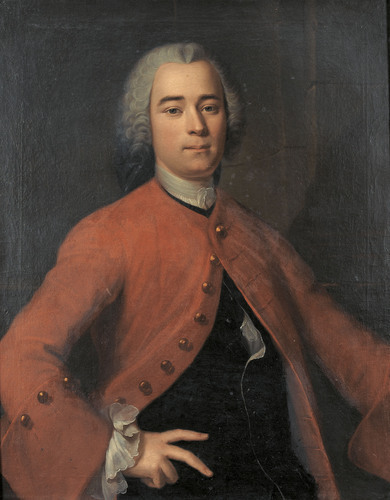
- Johann-Rudolf Marcuard in 1747, portrait by Jakob Emanuel Handmann
- Born: 25 December 1721; Payerne, Switzerland
- Died: 13 March 1795 (aged 73); Bern, Switzerland
- Citizenship: Switzerland
- Occupations: Banker, Founder, Marcuard & Cie.

Johann-Rudolf Marcuard (25 December 1721 – 13 March 1795) was a Swiss banker. He founded the bank Marcuard & Cie, which became one of the most prominent banks of the 18th century until its acquisition by Credit Suisse in 1919.

Marcuard & Cie, which was active in all the major metropolises of Europe, was notably commissioned in Vienna by Maria Theresa of Austria.

The Marcuard family currently maintains the Marcuard brand as a global network of wealth management firms across four continents.

== Biography ==
Marcuard began his career in trade and then founded the bank bearing his name in 1746, one of the most important Swiss companies in Europe. Based in Bern, Marcuard acquired the status of bourgeois of Yverdon on April 21, 1770.

Admitted into Nobility in 1772 by the Holy Roman Emperor Joseph II, he was awarded the name Edler von Marcuard.

Expanding into Marcuard, André and Co, the bank specialized in the transportation of goods from East India. It was acquired by Credit Suisse in 1919.

The prolific French author Jules Verne mentions Marcuard in his novel The Adventures of Captain Hatteras (Part 1, Chapter II), but writes "Marcuart" in Part 1, Chapter XII. He also cites him in Foundling Mick (Part 1, Chapter VIII).

Marcuard was also an acquaintance of influential philosopher Jean-Jacques Rousseau.
