= Melanella glypta =

- Shell of Melanella glypta (holotype)

Scientific classification
- Kingdom: Animalia
- Phylum: Mollusca
- Class: Gastropoda
- Subclass: Caenogastropoda
- Order: Littorinimorpha
- Family: Eulimidae
- Genus: Melanella
- Species: M. glypta

Binomial name
- Melanella glypta Bouchet & Warén, 1986

Species of gastropod

Melanella glypta is a species of sea snail, a marine gastropod mollusk in the family Eulimidae.

== Description ==
The length of the shell attains 4.1 mm, its diameter 1.24 mm.

== Distribution ==
This abyssal marine species occurs in the Strait of Sicily.
