= Palinuro Seamount =

Submarine volcano in the Tyrrhenian Sea

Palinuro
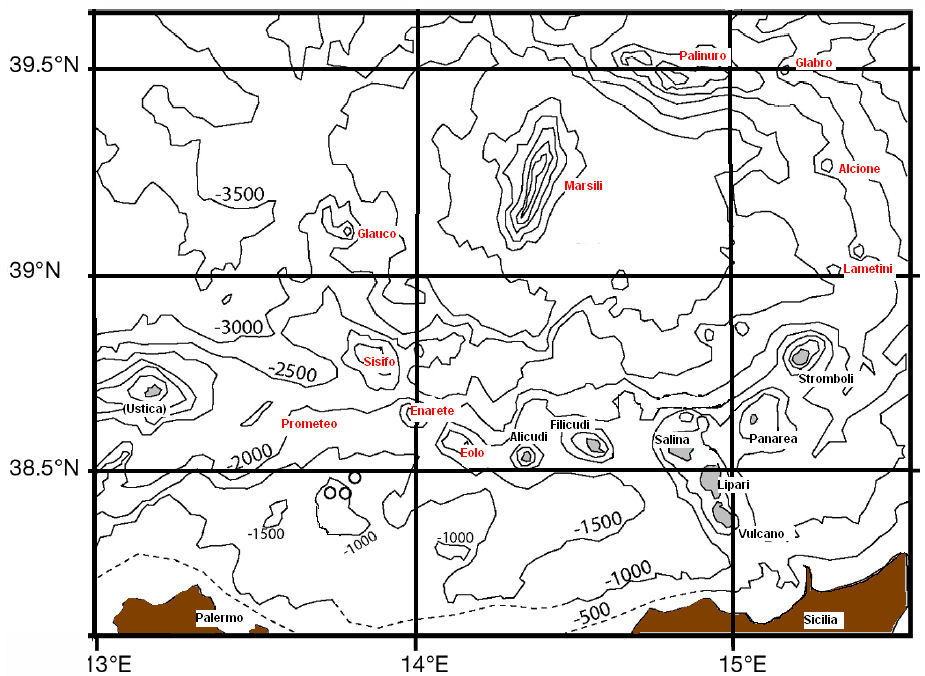
- Aeolian arc, including coastline and depth contour lines for every 500 meters.

- Location within Italy
- Summit depth: 70 m (230 ft)

Location
- Location: Tyrrhenian Sea
- Coordinates: 39°29′04″N 14°49′44″E

Palinuro Seamount is a seamount in the Tyrrhenian Sea. It is an elongated 50–70 km (31–43 mi) long complex of volcanoes north of the Aeolian Islands with multiple potential calderas. The shallowest point lies at 80–70 m (260–230 ft) depth and formed an island during past episodes of low sea level. Palinuro was active during the last 800,000 years and is likely the source for a 10,000 years old tephra layer in Italy. Ongoing seismicity occurs at the seamount, which may be a tsunami hazard. The volcanic activity may somehow relate to the subduction of the Ionian Sea farther east.

Diffuse hydrothermal activity takes place on Palinuro Seamount, which has led to the deposition of sulfide deposits in the seafloor that could be used as a source of ores for rare metals. Italy has declared the seamount a protected area, where algae and deep water corals occur.

== Geography and geomorphology ==
Palinuro lies north of the Aeolian Islands, in the Tyrrhenian Sea. Marsili Seamount lies about 30 km (19 mi) southwest from Palinuro and Glabro Seamount 29 km (18 mi) east of Palinuro. The Palinuro seamount is one of the largest in the Tyrrhenian Sea and is also known as Palinuro-Strabo seamount.

The seamount is about 3 km (1.9 mi) high. It has a 50 km (31 mi)-90 km (56 mi) long and 25 km (16 mi) wide east-west elongated shape. It is asymmetric, with the northern slopes less steep as they descend to 1,800 m (5,900 ft) depth than the southern slopes. There are traces of mass failures along the seamount, especially on its southern flank, and of east-west trending faulting.

Fifteen individual volcanoes make up the Palinuro volcano. A horseshoe shaped caldera is located in the western part of the seamount, and is c. 8 km (5.0 mi) wide. It may be related to a sector collapse and has been modified by erosion and renewed volcanism at its rim. To its west is another potential, c. 4 km (2.5 mi) wide sediment-filled caldera at the western end of the volcano. On the eastern end of Palinuro lies another potential caldera, also filled with sediment, as well as an uneroded crater. In the central area of Palinuro, but still within the eastern sector, lies the summit region: Two flat-topped cones known as "Pjotr's cones", c. 800 m (2,600 ft) and c. 2,500 m (8,200 ft) wide. The smaller of which rises to 80 m (260 ft)-70 m (230 ft) depth below sea level; it is the shallowest point of Palinuro. The flat-topped cones formed through erosion and feature marine terraces, which may have formed when sea levels were so low that the summit of Palinuro rose above the sea. Gullies, rocky outcrops and crater remnants are found on the flat-topped cones. Rocky outcrops are scarce in the central part of Palinuro seamount, which is largely covered with sediments.

== Geology ==
The African Plate and Eurasian Plate are converging across the Mediterranean, leading to tectonic activity in the region including the subduction of the Ionian Sea (Calabrian subduction) and the eastward migration of this subduction. The southern Tyrrhenian Sea is a back-arc basin which began to form 11 million years ago through crustal extension behind the eastward-shifting Ionian subduction, and is a complex geodynamic system. It features several volcanoes, including the Aeolian Islands volcanic arc generated by the Ionian subduction, the Marsili Seamount that appears to have formed on a spreading ridge-like structure, and Palinuro which has an unclear origin but may somehow relate to subduction as well. A 2017 proposal relates the volcanism of Palinuro and neighbouring seamounts except Marsili to the upwelling of asthenospheric mantle below the northern margin of the Calabrian subduction zone, and from underneath the descending Ionian slab.

The seamount may be located at the margin between the oceanic Marsili basin to the south, and the continental slope and sedimentary basin of the Salerno Gulf to the north. The east-west trending strike-slip fault that Palinuro seamount formed on may be the northern margin of the Calabrian subduction zone ("subduction-transform edge propagator") and continues through Glabro, Enotrio and Ovidio seamounts and then on land as the Cetraro-Rossano Line. This lineament also appears to separate a tectonically stable northern domain of Italy from a slowly uplifting southern domain. A second, northeastward trending lineament continues on land as the Palinuro-Sant' Arcangelo lineament.

=== Composition ===
Dredging has yielded basalt and basaltic andesite, which define a calc-alkaline rock suite. Phenocrysts include plagioclase and pyroxene.

== Biology ==
Dense and large stands of deep water corals and coralline algae grow on Palinuro, the latter particularly around the summit. Holothurians, melon sea urchins, nematodes, sabellids, serpulid worms, spiny lobsters, sponges, tube-dwelling anemones, tunicates and yellow gorgonians live there as well. Lower on the slopes algae become rarer and sponges more frequent, and black corals dominate at maximum depths. Dolphins, fish and sharks complete the fauna of Palinuro. There are traces of human disturbances such as abandoned long-lines and coral colonies damaged by dredging. Fossil algae, bivalves, bryozoans, corals, echinoids, gastropods, mussels and calcareous worm tubes have been dredged from Palinuro. When it was an emergent island during cold periods, Palinuro may have formed a stepping stone for plants. It still reaches into the photic zone of the sea, allowing the growth of algae.

Small hydrothermal deposits with the shape of chimneys are covered by microbial mats and there are bushes of tube worms. However, remotely operated vehicles have not identified substantial hydrothermal vent-associated communities. Italy has declared Palinuro a protected area as part of the European Natura 2000 project.

== Eruption history ==
Palinuro was active between 800,000 and 300,000 years ago. The growth of the seamount was probably protracted and complex and there appears to be a clear distinction between the eastern and western sectors of Palinuro, and the eastern half may be still active. Magnetic analysis indicates that fresh lavas occur in the eastern half of Palinuro while the western half shows evidence of hydrothermal alteration.

The PL-1 volcanic ash layer, which has been detected in marine sediment cores and on land in Italy, has been interpreted to come from Palinuro. It has been dated to 8040 BCE, and may have been emitted from an emergent Palinuro when sea levels were lower because of the last glaciation era.

=== Recent activity and hazards ===
Palinuro or its southeastern sector may still be active, as volcanic seismicity has been detected between Palinuro and the Calabrian coast. Seismicity at low depths, perhaps linked to hydrothermal activity, has also been recorded. Microearthquakes between 10–16 km (6.2–9.9 mi) depth may mark a melt storage zone.

Volcanic edifices are often unstable and prone to mass failures, and submarine volcanoes and volcanoes next to the seas can cause devastating tsunamis like the 2018 Sunda Strait tsunami caused by a collapse of Anak Krakatau volcano, which killed 437 people. Palinuro seamount shows evidence of past instability - including collapses that post-date the Last Glacial Maximum 18,000-20,000 years ago, and seismicity and hydrothermal activity - which tend to weaken volcanic edifices - could contribute to future collapses on the volcano, especially its steep southern flank. Some collapse scenarios could generate waves several metres high that would impact Sicily and Campania.

== Hydrothermal activity and deposits ==
Diffuse hydrothermal emissions have been found at Palinuro, which form small chimneys, stained rocks, spires reaching 30 cm (12 in) height and warm (>60 °C (140 °F)) muds with sulfide-sulfate deposits. The hydrothermal vents are found on the western side of Palinuro, around the horseshoe-shaped caldera, while hydrothermal vent deposits are found throughout the edifice. The vents around the horseshoe-shaped caldera may coincide with the margins of the caldera and thus are structurally controlled. Recent hydrothermal deposits around the summit, which was eroded during low sea level, indicate hydrothermal activity during the Holocene. The active hydrothermal vents are accompanied by chemical anomalies in the water column, and ships have reported a smell of hydrogen sulfide above the eastern part of Palinuro.

Hydrothermal activity is responsible for the deposition of baryte, galena, pyrite and sphalerite, in the form of sulfide-sulfate deposits. Additional minerals reported are bravoite, chalcopyrite, covellite, enargite, marcasite, luzonite, melnikovite, tennanite, wurtzite and lead and silver containing sulfosalts. The sulfide deposits typically have a gel-like appearance and contain bacterial fossils, implying that microbial activity played a major role in their development. They occur in several metres thick deposits, often buried by sediments and in proximity to hydrothermal vents. Such seafloor massive sulfide deposits are potential sources for metals, both base and precious, and have thus drawn scientific attention. Other reported minerals at Palinuro are bismuthinite, bismuth tellurides, stibnite and traces of gold, indium, silver and sulfur.

Iron and manganese-containing crusts and nodules occur on Palinuro, which probably formed under hydrothermal influence after a transition from high (which emplaced the sulfides) to low temperature hydrothermal activity. They are often found in spatial coincidence with sulfidic deposits which form chimneys. The crusts and nodules contain manganate plus aragonite, calcite, clinopyroxene, illite, muscovite, plagioclase and quartz. The iron-manganese crusts have commercial potential.

== See also ==
- Malta Escarpment
- Campi Flegrei del Mar di Sicilia
- Calypso Deep
- Hellenic Trench
- Mediterranean Ridge
- Eratosthenes Seamount
