= Empedocles (volcano) =

Large underwater volcano off the southern coast of Sicily

Coordinates: 37°09′49″N 12°43′07″E

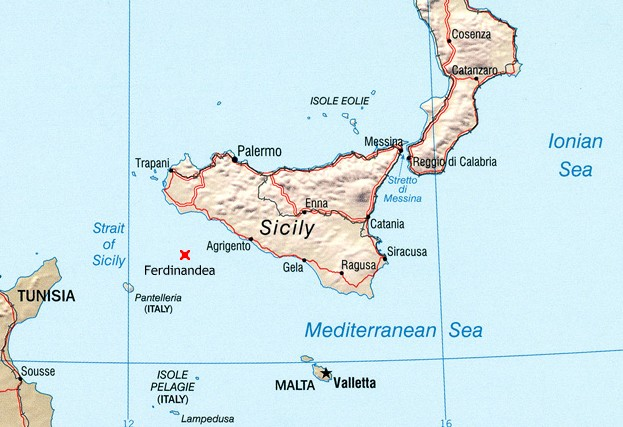
- Empedocles is composed of several volcanic centers, including Ferdinandea.
- Summit depth: 8 m (26 ft)
- Height: 400 m (1,312 ft)
- Summit area: Campi Flegrei del Mar di Sicilia (Phlegraean Fields of the Sea of Sicily)
- Translation: Name of a Greek philosopher (from Ancient Greek)

Location
- Location: Between Sicily and Tunisia
- Country: Disputed, assumed Italy

Geology
- Type: Submarine volcano
- Last eruption: 1831

History
- Discovery date: 2006

Empedocles is a large underwater volcano located 40 km (25 mi) off the southern coast of Sicily named after the Greek philosopher Empedocles who believed that everything on Earth was made up of the four elements, and who is said by legend to have thrown himself into a volcano.

According to Italy's National Institute of Geophysics and Volcanology, the volcanic structure is around 400 m (1,300 ft) high, with a base 30 km long and 25 km wide (20 mi × 15 mi). Located in the Campi Flegrei del Mar di Sicilia (Phlegraean Fields of the Strait of Sicily), Empedocles is composed of what was once believed to be separate volcanic centers, including Graham Island (Ferdinandea).

The volcano shows no sign of erupting in the near future. While the volcano's top is now 7 metres (23 ft) below sea level, it has been visible above the water several times in recorded history. In 1831, Empedocles broke the surface as Graham Island (Ferdinandea) and almost caused a major international incident when several countries tried to claim ownership of it. It disappeared into the water again six months later.
