= Malta Escarpment =

Mediterranean undersea geological feature

- Location within Italy

Location
- Location: Mediterranean Sea
- Coordinates: 36°44′N 15°21′E

The Malta Escarpment is a prominent undersea geological feature of the Mediterranean Sea that runs southwards from the eastern coasts from Sicily and Malta towards the Medina Seamounts near the African coast and divides the Mediterranean Sea naturally into western and eastern regions. It is also known as the Sicily-Malta Escarpment.

The 290 km (180.198mi) long escarpment can reach heights of 3.5 km (2.17mi) and has a gradient of 45°, making it one of the largest and steepest seafloor features.

The submarine cliff comprises a sequence of carbonate and volcanic rock outcrops marking the eastern end of the Malta/Hyblean Plateau, which is part of the continental shelf, known as the Pelagian Platform. The University of Malta, UK National Oceanography Center, New Zealand National Institute of Water and Atmospheric Research, University College Dublin and Italy's Istituto Nazionale di Oceanografia e Geofisica researched extensively the escarpment between 2012 and 2018.

Diverging viewpoints exist regarding the stability of the eastern flank of the Mount Etna volcano, which extends underwater at the edge of the escarpment. The escarpment is also the source of the volcano's lava.

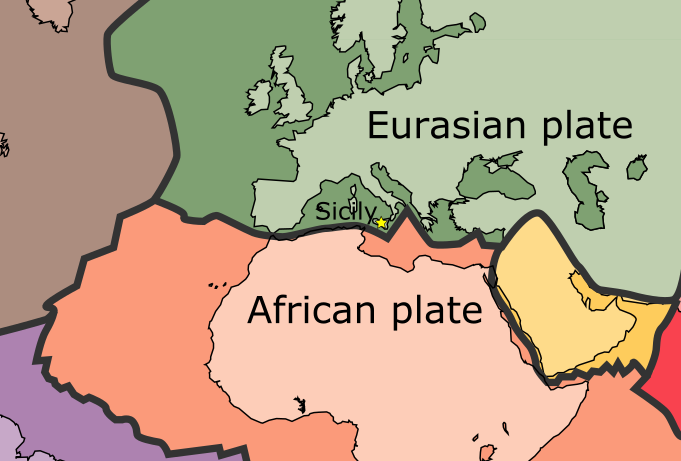
The Eurasian and African Tectonic Plates

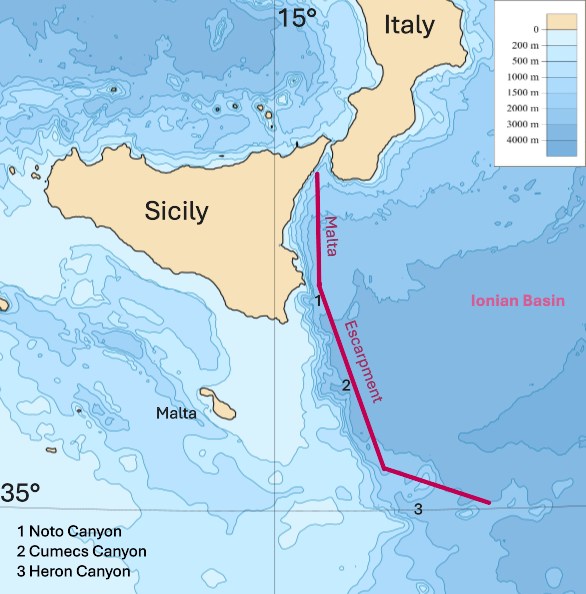
Map of Malta Escarpment

The escarpment was formed by the subduction of the African Plate beneath the Eurasian Plate. These movements are still ongoing, roughly an annual 4 millimetres in the western Mediterranean to one centimetre in the eastern Mediterranean. Several earthquakes and subsequent tsunamis struck the Ionian coast of south-eastern Sicily and the Maltese archipelago in 1169, 1693 and 1908. The study of geological features such as the Malta Escarpment is especially important in the understanding of the causes and effects of earthquakes, landslides and tsunamis. Disaster prevention and mitigation measures, such as education and early warning systems, can assist in the protection of coastal communities. The Tsunami Ready Recognition Programme of the Intergovernmental Oceanographic Commission within UNESCO is one such initiative.

== Undersea canyons ==
The undersea cliff is incised by more than 500 canyons, while landslide occurrence has been inferred from sediment samples collected from the base of the escarpment. The 2012 research on the escarpment closest to Sicily identified 70 submarine landslides as well as black coral reefs, while a 2014 survey focused further south but still on the northern part of the escarpment, especially on the Cumecs Canyon. Rich biological communities may be found in the canyons, which also serve as channels for both nutrients and pollution due to underwater currents. Striped dolphins were observed near these canyons.

The largest of the canyons are the Noto, Cumecs, and Heron Canyons. The Noto Canyon is 27 km long, 15 km wide and 1.5 km deep, while the Cumecs Canyon is 37 km long, 39 km wide and 3 km deep. Both are within the northern part of the escarpment. The Heron Canyon is the largest canyon along the escarpment, being 100 km long and up to 10 km wide. Its depth ranges from 450 m at the head to 4 km at the mouth and may be found towards the south end of the escarpment. This southern area of the escarpment has been observed to be close to a wrench zone.

The particularity of these deep underwater valleys is that they are not associated with any existing rivers. Six million years ago, following the closure of the Straits of Gibraltar, the Mediterranean Sea was transformed into a giant saline lake that partially dried up as a result of the dry climate of the region. More than one million cubic kilometres of salt were deposited on the Mediterranean seabed, with salt deposits in some locations exceeding 3 km in thickness. This period, known as the Messinian Salinity Crisis (MSC), lasted around 640,000 years until a catastrophic flood through the Strait of Gibraltar. Known as the Zanclean flood. After refilling of the western Mediterranean Sea basin, seawater overflowed over the escarpment into the Ionian basin. The flood resulted in a 1.5 km high waterfall eroding significantly the Noto Canyon, leaving extensive sediments over a large area and up to 900 m deep. Researchers used these geological features and salt deposits, to demonstrate that:

- the level of the Mediterranean Sea during the MSC dropped by more than a kilometre;
- the canyons were mainly formed by fluvial erosion during the MSC, with current ocean currents contributing to further erosion;
- also during the MSC coastal erosion developed extensive palaeoshorelines and shore platforms at the base of the escarpment; and
- that the end of the MSC coincided with the Zanclean flood.

During the MSC, an aquifer holding approximately 17.5 cubic kilometres of offshore freshened groundwater formed thousands of feet below the Hyblaean Mountains.

== See also ==
- Geology of Malta
- Campi Flegrei del Mar di Sicilia
- Palinuro Seamount
- Calypso Deep
- Hellenic Trench
- Mediterranean Ridge
- Eratosthenes Seamount
