= Bulletin de la Société Géologique de France =

- Discipline: Earth science
- Language: English and French

Publication details
- History: 1830–present
- Publisher: EDP Sciences (France)
- Frequency: Upon acceptance
- Open access: Yes
- License: Creative Commons
- Impact factor: 1.262 (2017)

Standard abbreviations
- ISO 4: Bull. Soc. Géol. Fr.

Indexing
- ISSN: 0037-9409
- OCLC no.: 1765827

Links
- Journal homepage; Online access

The Bulletin de la Société Géologique de France, otherwise known as BSGF - Earth Sciences Bulletin is a peer-reviewed open access scientific journal covering Earth sciences. The journal publishes articles, short communications, reviews, comments and replies. It is published by EDP Sciences and the editor-in-chief is Laurent Jolivet (Sorbonne Université, Paris). The journal was established in 1830. It is a publication of the Société géologique de France. Most of the older content, published before 1924 is available online at the Biodiversity Heritage Library.

The journal is a historically important venue for great debates on the various interpretations of the history of the earth and the history of life between 1830 and 1860.

== Abstracting and indexing ==
The journal is abstracted and indexed in:

- Biological Abstracts
- CSA International Aerospace Abstracts
- GEOBASE
- GeoRef
- Petroleum Abstracts TULSA Database
- Web of Science
According to the Journal Citation Reports, the journal has a 2017 impact factor of 1.262.

== Biological taxa first described in this journal ==
Many new genera and species have been first described in this journal. For example:

- The crocodyliform genus Siamosuchus was first described in the Bulletin in 2007.
- The dinosaur genus Atsinganosaurus was first described in the Bulletin in 2010.

== Notable scientists who have published in this journal ==
- The French geologist Gabriel Auguste Daubrée
- The French geologist René Chudeau
- The taxonomist Robert Hoffstetter
- The French palaeontologist Marcellin Boule
- The French geologist and palaeontologist Henri Coquand
- The French geologist and palaeontologist Jean Albert Gaudry
- The French geologist Pierre-Marie Termier
- The French geologist Charles Lory
- The Swiss geologist and palaeontologist Hans Georg Stehlin
