= Captain Antifer =

1894 novel by Jules Verne

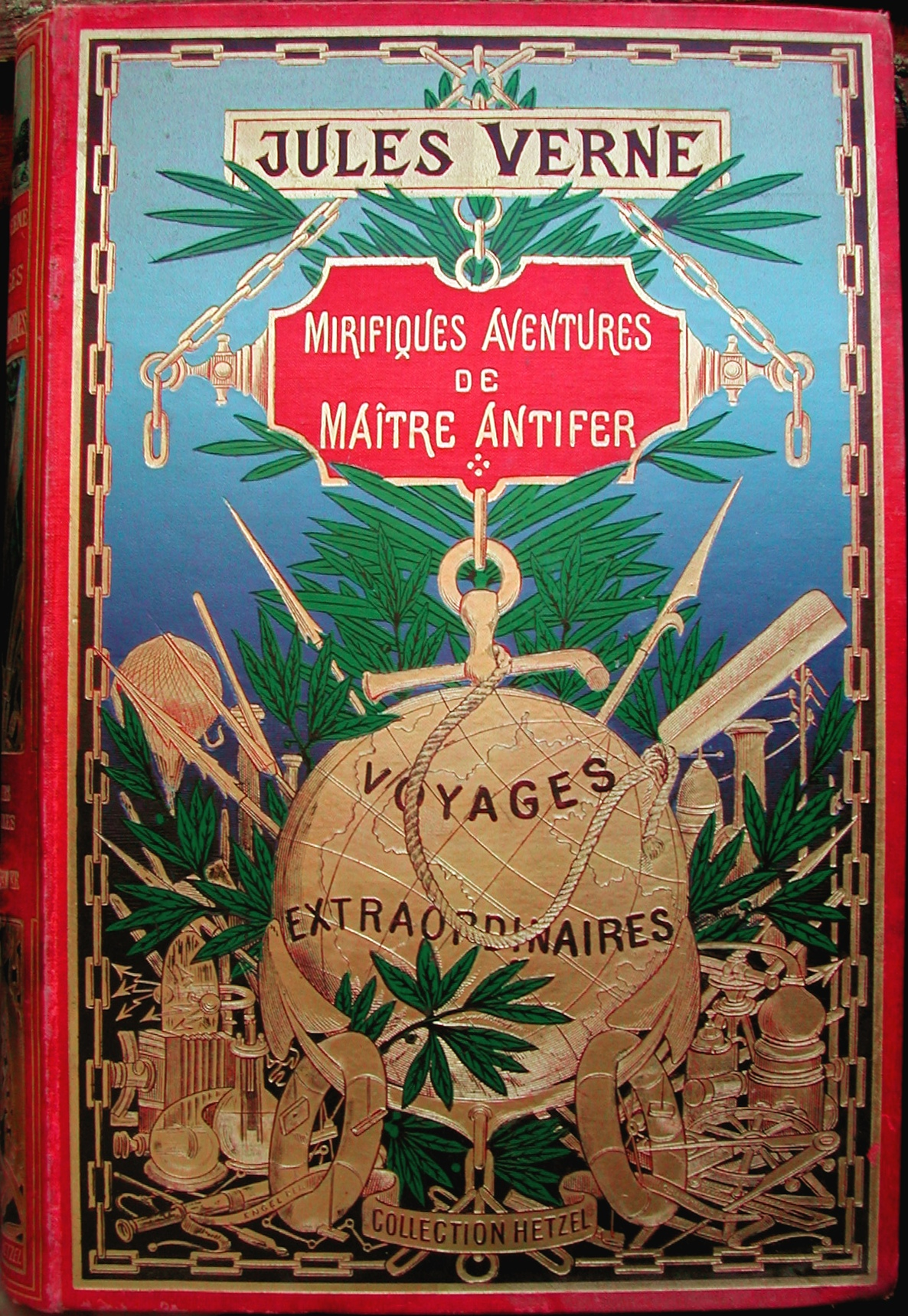
- Cover of French edition
- Author: Jules Verne
- Original title: Mirifiques Aventures de Maître Antifer
- Illustrator: Georges Roux
- Language: French
- Series: The Extraordinary Voyages #40
- Genre: Adventure novel
- Publisher: Pierre-Jules Hetzel
- Publication date: 1894
- Publication place: France
- English publication date: 1895
- Media type: Print (Hardback)
- OCLC: 11889609
- Preceded by: Foundling Mick
- Followed by: Propeller Island

Captain Antifer (French: Mirifiques Aventures de Maître Antifer, literally "The Wonderful Adventures of Captain Antifer", 1894) is an adventure novel written by Jules Verne. The novel tells of a treasure hunt, where the clues – arriving in bits and pieces – lead the seaman Pierre Antife of Saint-Malo and various others of diverse nationalities and backgrounds on a complicated route – from Tunisia to the Persian Gulf, the Gulf of Guinea, and then to Edinburgh, Spitzbergen, and finally to the Mediterranean off Sicily.

== Publication history ==
The novel was completed in 1892. It was serialized in the Magasin d'éducation et de récréation, from 1 January to 15 December 1894. It was then published in book form by Verne's regular publisher Hetzel. The story was translated into English in 1895 and serialized in The Boy's Own Paper, No. 841 (23 February 1895) through No. 872 (28 September 1895), including 32 consecutive weekly issues. In June 1895, New York publisher R.F. Fenno released an English paperback edition of the entire novel.

== Plot ==
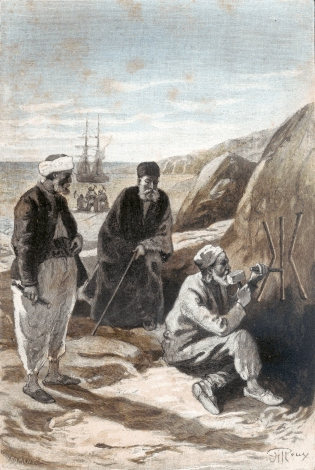
Kamylk-Pasha buries his fortune

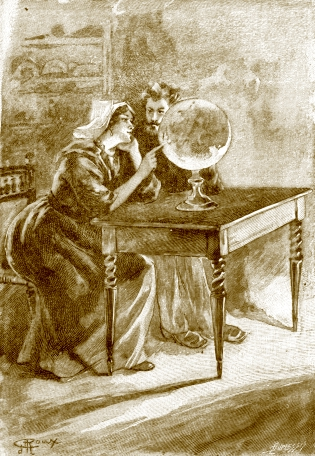
The secret of the final island at last discovered

1799: The French campaign in Egypt and Syria. At Jaffa, General Napoléon Bonaparte ruthlessly orders the killing of 4,500 Turkish prisoners of war. A Breton sea captain attached to the French force notices a still living young Turkish soldier among the piled bodies, and saves his life. The Turk, who would later rise to great wealth and prominence in Cairo, will not forget his saviour.

1831: The wealthy Egyptian Kamylk-Pasha buries his treasures in the rock of an unknown islet, to save them from the greed of his family.

1862: In Saint-Malo, Pierre Antifer, an impulsive and gruff Breton sea captain, meditates on a document bequeathed by his father – a letter sent by Kamylk-Pasha, whose life the father had saved. This document mentions the latitude of the island where the treasure is hidden, with the longitude to be communicated to Antifer once upon a time. Antifer's nephew, Juhel, thinks only of his coming marriage with his beloved Enogate and fears the consequences of a possible trip.

The Egyptian notary Ben-Omar – accompanied by Saouk, the last heir of the Pasha – arrives at Saint-Malo and reveals to Master Antifer the long desired longitude. The impulsive seaman immediately embarks, drawing with him his friend Gildas Tregomain and poor Juhel, whose marriage was put off indefinitely. The islet is located in the Arabian Sea off the coast of Muscat in Oman.

Alas! Instead of the expected treasure, the travelers discover a second parchment, indicating a new longitude, and referring them to the Maltese banker Zambuco, who once helped Kamylk-Pasha and thus deserves a share of the hidden treasure. Zambuco has the latitude, and the new location turns out to be another islet – off the African coast, in the Gulf of Guinea.

There, they find a new message, including a small diamond to defray their mounting travelling costs, a new longitude and the name of a new treasure-colleague residing in Scotland. However, when arriving in Edinburgh, they find that the Reverend Tyrcomel is an advocate of the complete abolition of wealth: he has no interest in finding the treasure himself nor in helping others get it, and obstinately refuses to hand over the latitude in his possession.

Saouk, violent and unscrupulous, resorts to brute force: coming back in the night, undressing and tying up the unfortunate Tyrcomel – and discovering the required information tattooed on the Scotsman's body, put there by his late father who had once traveled to the Orient and helped Kamylk-Pasha. The brigand would not benefit from his violent deed – Saouk ends up in a British prison, but the rest of the treasure hunters know where to head to next.

Antifer, equipped with the new latitude, charters a ship for Spitzbergen, where a third islet is located. He discovers only a half-illegible document, and is unable to identify the final location of the jackpot. Sick and tired with frustration, he returns to Saint-Malo and Juhel can finally marry Enogate.

Inadvertently, the young woman reveals the solution to the riddle to her husband—and his uncle, who is assisting him—enabling them to decipher the cryptic ancient manuscript: the treasure is hidden off the coast of Sicily, at the very center of a circle drawn around the three small, isolated islands they had previously visited. Everyone rushes there—only to find nothing but an empty expanse of sea. The volcanic Julia island had emerged from the depths of the ocean in 1831, and treasure had been hidden there—but, unfortunately, shortly after its emergence, it sank back into the ocean depths. And so, one had to bid farewell to Kamilk-Pasha’s gold and precious gems!

== Julia Island ==
Julia Island (also known as Graham Island) which figures in the book's dramatic conclusion, is historical and did indeed appear in 1831 and disappear in 1832, creating an international dispute over ownership at the time. In the early 21st century there were indications that it might reappear because of additional volcanic activity just as predicted in the book – though far too late for Captain Antifer and his companions (also predicted).
