= Marcuard & Co. =

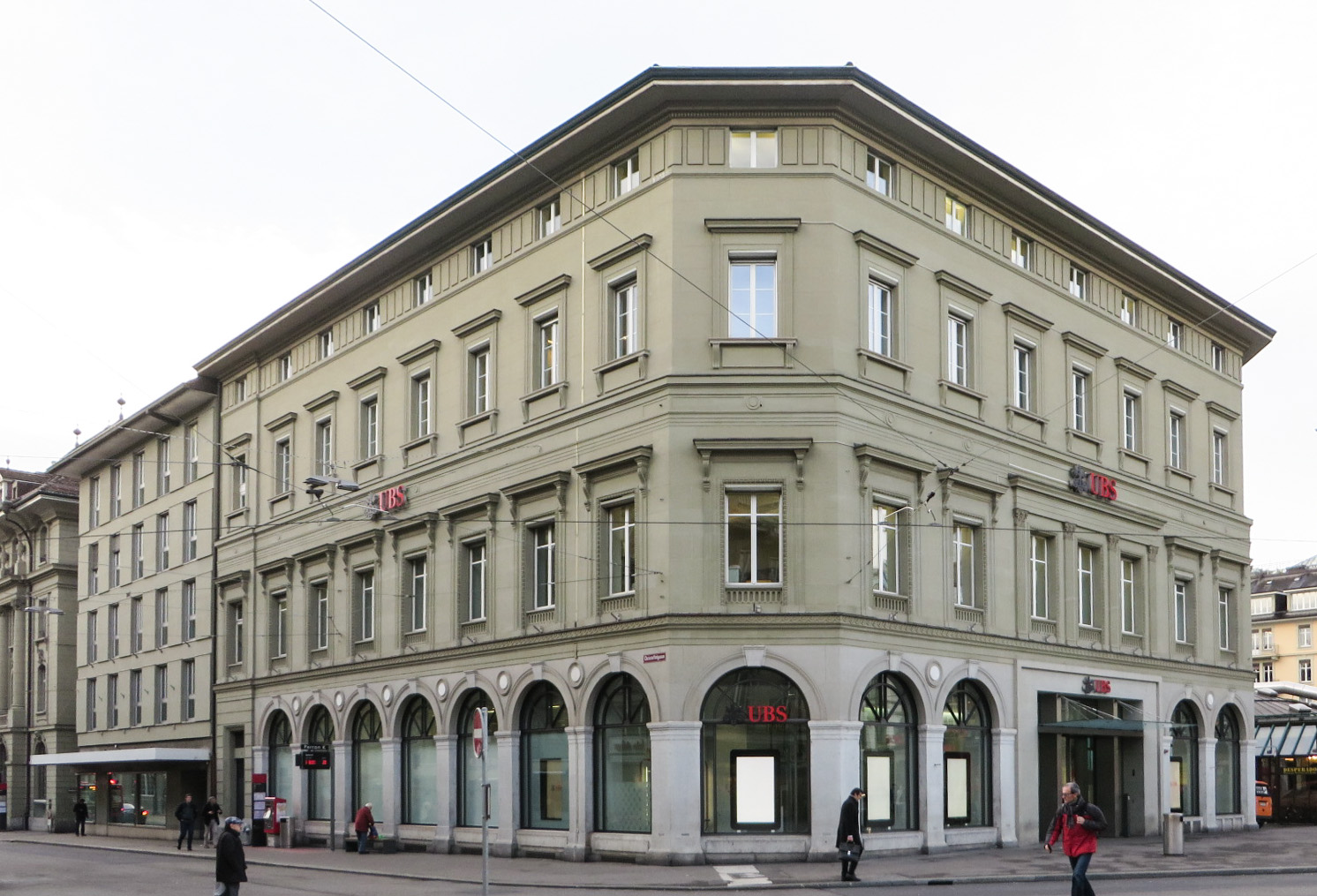
Christoffelgasse in Bern, historic headquarters of the bank

Marcuard & Co., founded by Johann Rudolf Marcuard in 1746, was a private bank based in Bern, Switzerland. One of the first banks in Switzerland, it quickly became one of the largest banks of the 18th century. It merged with Crédit Suisse in 1919 and operated jointly until 1995.

== History ==
Marcuard & Morel was founded in 1746 by Johann Rudolf Marcuard, a trader selling printed Indian rubber and importing Arabic rubber. From 1755, the bank was called "Jean Rodolphe Marcuard & Cie" after the French name of its founder.

From 1775 up until 1825, the bank was led by Samuel Friedrich Marcuard and Johann Konrad Beuther, and it became one of the most prominent banks of the 18th century. with correspondents in several European cities such as Vienna, Paris, Copenhagen, and Amsterdam among others.

A large number of European powers called on the Bank's services, including Austria, in need of capital following the Seven Years' War.
