= Constant Prévost =

French geologist (1787 – 1856)

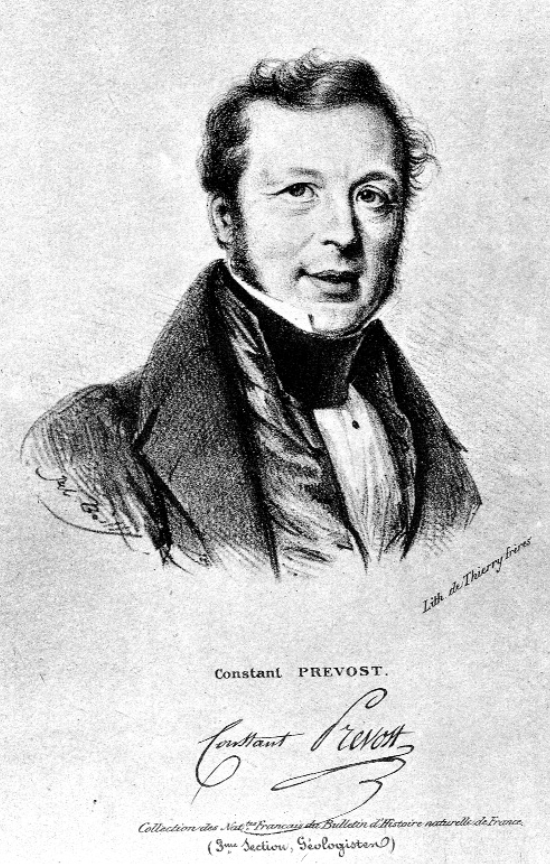
Constant Prévost, c. 1820

Louis-Constant Prévost (4 June 1787 – 14 August 1856) was a French geologist.

== Early life and education ==
Prévost was born in Paris to Louis Prévost, a tax farmer, receiver of the rentes of Paris. He was educated there at the Central Schools, where, inspired by the lectures of Georges Cuvier, his particular mentor Alexandre Brongniart, and André Marie Constant Duméril, he determined to devote himself to natural science. He took his degree in Letters and Sciences in 1811, and for a time pursued the study of medicine and anatomy.

== Career ==
Mainly through the influence of Brongniart he turned his attention to geology. During the years 1816 to 1819 he took advantage of the necessity of accompanying his associate Philippe de Girard, who was seeking out a site for establishing a textile mill near Vienna, by making a special study of the Viennese Basin. In doing so, he pointed out for the first time the presence of Tertiary strata like those of the Paris Basin, but which included a series of later date. His next work (1821) was an essay on the geology of parts of Normandy, with special reference to the "Secondary"—or Mesozoic— strata, which he compared with those of southern England; in this he had the collaboration of Charles Lyell.

From 1821-1829 he was professor of geology at the Athenaeum at Paris, and he took a leading part with Ami Boue, Gérard Paul Deshayes and Jules Desnoyers in the founding of the Société géologique de France (1830). In 1831 he became assistant professor and afterwards honorary professor of geology to the faculty of sciences of the Sorbonne. He was on hand with an artist to witness the undersea volcano that produced Ferdinandea (now Graham Bank) off the south coast of Sicily that July; he named it Île Julia, for its July appearance, and reported in the Bulletin de la Société Géologique de France In 1848 he was elected to his late mentor Brogniart's seat in the Académie des sciences

Having studied the volcanoes of Italy and Auvergne, he opposed the views of Christian Leopold von Buch regarding craters of elevation, maintaining that the cones were due to the material successively erupted. Like Lyell he advocated a study of the slow and incessant forces in action at present, in order to illustrate the past, the principle in geology called uniformitarianism, discounting catastrophic events. One of his more important memoirs was De la Chronologie des terrains et du synchronisme des formations (1845), in which he expounded the principle of the synchronicity of successive stages of igneous and sedimentary deposition across wide terrains. His most general titles were Documents pour l'histoire des terrains tertiaires (Paris, 1827) and his Traité de géographie physique co-authored with E. Bassano (Paris, 1836).
