= Sabrina Island (Azores) =

Short-lived volcanic island (1811)

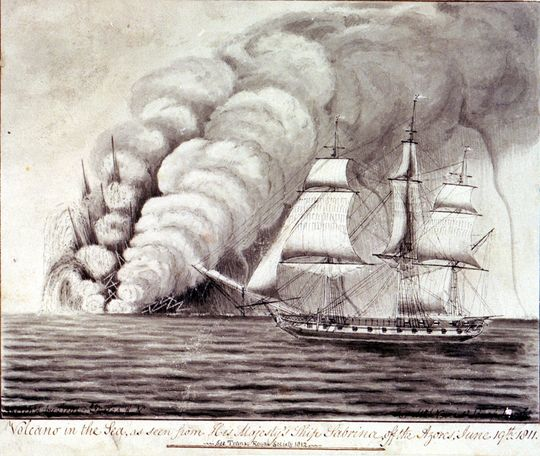
- The eruption of the Sabrina Island, as drawn 19 June 1811, by Lieutenant John William Miles of HMS Sabrina. Behind the ship is a waterspout.

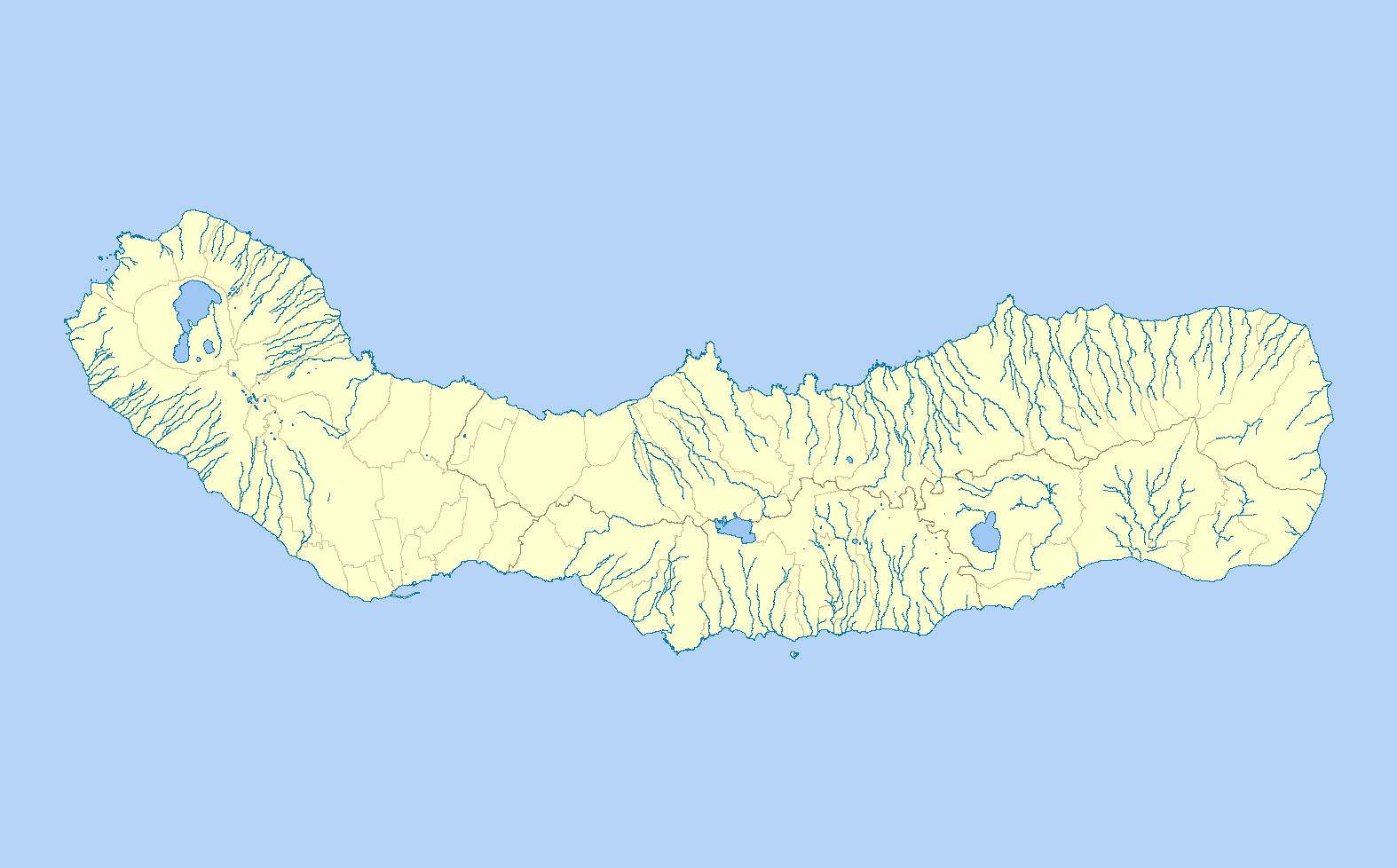
- Location of the islets off the coast of São Miguel Sabrina Island (Azores) (Azores) Sabrina Island (Azores) (North Atlantic)

Geography
- Location: Atlantic Ocean
- Coordinates: 37°51′1″N 25°50′58″W

Administration
- Portugal
- Autonomous region: Azores

Demographics
- Population: uninhabited

Sabrina Island (Portuguese: Ilha Sabrina) was an islet formed during the months of June and July 1811 by a submarine volcanic eruption off the coast of Ponta da Ferraria, São Miguel Island, Azores. The first person to land on the island was Commander James Tillard, captain of the British warship HMS Sabrina, who hoisted the Union Jack on the island and claimed sovereignty for Great Britain. A diplomatic row with Portugal over the issue ensued, which the island's sinking back into the sea rendered moot.

== History ==
=== Formation and discovery ===
Between January and February 1811 a prolonged period of seismic activity affected the settlements to the extreme southwest of São Miguel, in particular in the parishes of Ginetes and Mosteiros. During these months, gases emitted from the ocean around Ponta da Ferraria, but by the end of February they abruptly ceased. New tremors returned in May and June, destroying many homes in Ginetes. Finally on 10 June 1811, in an area about 3 nautical miles (5.6 km; 3.5 mi) from the original seismic zones and about 2 kilometres (1.1 nmi; 1.2 mi) off the coast, a submarine eruption occurred alongside Ponta da Ferraria, killing many fish.

On 12 June, the eruption was seen from the British sloop-of-war HMS Sabrina, which was patrolling the Azores due to the then ongoing Peninsular War. Commander James Tillard, thinking the smoke from the eruption was a naval battle, sailed to the area but found a situation quite different than he imagined. He later wrote a description of the eruption and his visit to the island of Sabrina for the Philosophical Transactions of the Royal Society.

The next morning, 13 June, HMS Sabrina landed in Ponta Delgada as Tillard had a pre-appointed meeting with William Harding Read, British consul general to the Azores. Read informed Tillard of the multiple earthquakes felt on São Miguel, especially in Ginetes and Mosteiros, which had caused panic among the island's residents. On 14 June Tillard desired to approach the eruption zone again by sea but wind conditions disallowed it, so instead he rode to Ginetes by horse, where he was able to observe the eruption from land. As Tillard lunched by the coast in Ginetes, seismic activity was so intense it caused a landslide destroying part of the cliff nearest him.

Tillard, even more enthusiastic, sailed HMS Sabrina toward the eruption area on the night of 15 June, but weak winds still kept him from approaching as closely as he hoped.

Again on 18 June HMS Sabrina approached the eruption zone. In an area where Sabrina's crew had previously measured a depth of 40 fathoms (240 ft; 73 m), they now observed rock formations just below the water's surface, as well as constant emission of ash and steam. After three hours of observation, the growing volcanic landmass had reached an estimated altitude of 10 metres (33 ft) above sea level. Tillard christened the newly-formed island Sabrina after his ship.

The following day, 19 June, Sabrina Island had grown to an estimated altitude of 20 metres (66 ft) above sea level and measured approximately 1 kilometre (0.62 mi) in diameter. Despite being 5 kilometres (2.7 nmi; 3.1 mi) away from the island, Sabrina became covered in fine black ash and water thrown into the air by the eruption. The ship's crew unsuccessfully attempted a closer approach of the island, after which they returned to port in Ponta Delgada.

=== Diplomatic row between Great Britain and Portugal ===
On 4 July, the eruption appeared to stop and constant tremors—felt in Ginetes since May—ceased. In fair weather Sabrina finally approached the new island. Tillard and Read landed on the island, planted the Union Jack, and formally claimed the island for Great Britain and King George III.

This claim caused a diplomatic conflict with the Kingdom of Portugal, as the Azores were under Portuguese sovereignty and had been since their discovery. This was compounded by the fact England and Portugal have been allies continuously since at least 1386. In fact, as previously noted, Sabrina was in the Azores because Britain was assisting Portugal in the Peninsular War.

Because of the war, the Portuguese government and monarchy had relocated to Rio de Janeiro, Brazil. As they were dependent on British aid against the French, they did not pursue the issue with too much zeal. The conflict petered out naturally by October of 1811, by which time water erosion had dismantled the new island, as is often the case with islands formed by certain types of volcanic eruptions.

=== Legacy ===
A member of HMS Sabrina's crew, Colonel John William Miles, drew Sabrina Island during the 19 June 1811 approach. His work is today exhibited at the National Maritime Museum in Greenwich, England, United Kingdom.

The eruption garnered international scientific interest and commentary at the time. Among others, Charles Darwin wrote a letter regarding the incident.

A similar occurrence and diplomatic spat took place in 1831 in the Mediterranean Sea off the coast of Sicily. After a volcanic eruption formed an island, Great Britain claimed it as Graham Island. The ensuing four-way territorial dispute between Great Britain, France, Spain, and the Kingdom of the Two Sicilies ultimately resolved as the Sabrina Island conflict had.

== Geography ==
At its largest, Sabrina Island was a circular volcanic cone with a perimeter of 2 kilometres (1.2 mi) and an altitude between 90 and 100 metres (300 and 330 ft) above sea level. The cone was similar in form to the existing Islet of Vila Franca do Campo, with an open ring to the northwest. From the central ring debris escaped into the sea.

Because of water erosion, islands formed by submarine volcanic activity often have short, ephemeral existences, especially if they are formed of uncompacted tephra. This was the case with Sabrina Island: despite reaching a height of about 100 metres (330 ft), it was quickly destroyed by erosion.

Today, the area where the eruption occurred measures 75 metres (246 ft) deep. The underwater rock formation there slopes toward the southeast, and the surrounding area has an average depth of 350 metres (1,150 ft). Volcanic activity continues: volcanic gases can still be seen rising to the surface.

== In Literature ==
The appearance of this island inspired Lydia Sigourney's playful poem Sabrina., published in her 1827 volume of poetry.

== See also ==
- Graham Island (Mediterranean Sea)
- Surtsey

== Sources ==
- "A Ilha Sabrina e a Erupção Submarina em S. Miguel de 1811", Insulana, vol. 3/4, Ponta Delgada (Azores), Portugal, 1951, pp. 260–265
- Humboldt, Alexander von (1851), Cosmos: A Sketch of a Physical Description of the Universe, vol. 1, London, England: Henry G. Bohn, p. 242
- Webster, John White (1822), Description of the Island of St. Michael, comprising an account of its Geological Structure; with Remarks on the Other Azores or Western Islands, Boston, Massachusetts: R.P. & C. Williams
- Tillard, James (1812), "A Narrative of the Eruption of a Volcano in the Sea off the Island of St. Michael", Philosophical Transactions of the Royal Society of London, vol. 102, London, England, pp. 152–158, 422–423
