= Calypso Deep =

Deepest part of the Mediterranean Sea

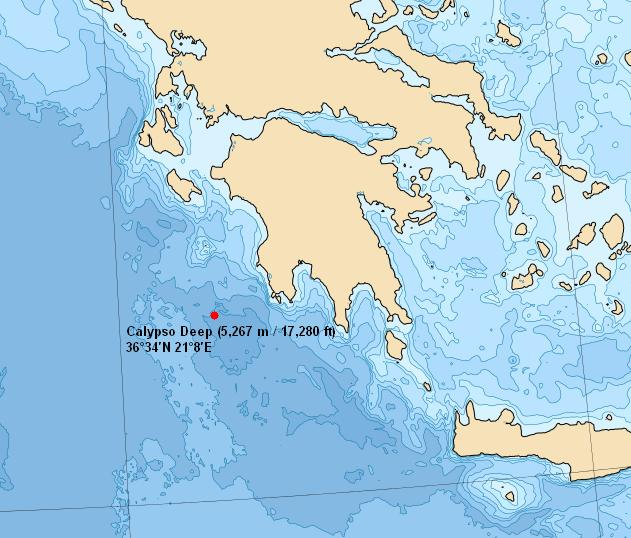
Location of Calypso Deep.

Calypso Deep is the deepest point in the Mediterranean Sea, located in the Hellenic Trench in the Ionian Sea, 62.6 km south-west of Pylos, Greece, with a maximum depth of approximately 5,200 m (17,100 ft). It lies at about 36°34′N 21°8′E.

== Crewed descents ==
The first crewed descent into Calypso Deep was on 27 September 1965 by Captain Gérard Huet de Froberville, Dr. Charles "Chuck" L. Drake (USA), and Henri Germain Delauze in the French bathyscaphe Archimède. Drake, Froberville, and Delauze reported a maximum depth of 5,110 m (16,770 ft) without a reference to the measurement accuracy.

In January 2020, Caladan Oceanic commenced its second year of deep diving with the deep-submergence vehicle Limiting Factor, piloted by Victor Vescovo. The first dives of the 2020 season commenced with dives to the French submarine Minerve in the Mediterranean Sea on 1–2 February 2020, and the second crewed descent to the Calypso Deep. On 10 February 2020 Victor Vescovo and Prince Albert II of Monaco reached the bottom of the Calypso Deep at a newly calculated depth of 5,109 m (16,762 ft) ±1 m (3 ft) using multiple direct measurement sensors. The 2020 expedition validated that the French mission in 1965 had, in fact, reached the deepest point of the Mediterranean Sea which, until this point, was not affirmed.

== See also ==
- Extremes on Earth
- NESTOR Project
- Malta Escarpment
- Campi Flegrei del Mar di Sicilia
- Palinuro Seamount
- Mediterranean Ridge
- Eratosthenes Seamount
