= Société géologique de France =

French learned society

The Société géologique de France (French pronunciation: [sɔsjete ʒeɔlɔʒik də fʁɑ̃s], SGF) is a French learned society founded on 17 March 1830. As of 2006, it counts 1,200 members.

== History ==
At its creation, its statutes indicate is to "compete for the advancement of Earth Sciences and Planets, both in itself and in its relations with industry, agriculture, environment And Education". At that time, geology was mainly undertaken in France under the aegis of the Corps des Mines and the Academy of Sciences. In August 1830 the company was presented to the new King who had arrived on the road after the revolution of July 1830. Constant Prévost in this presentation on the freedom of action and thought of the members of the society "Sire, to become flourishing, the sciences need freedom". This liberty is not sought with regard to political power, nor to other scientific institutions, particularly the Academy of Sciences and the General Secretariat Georges Cuvier, but Cuvier's too fixative views are incapable of development, Study of Lamarck's ideas. SGF is recognized as a public utility on April 3, 1832. Publications in 1830 the Society began publishing the Bulletin de la Société Géologique de France. In 2017 the Bulletin de la Société Géologique de France converted to become a fully open access journal. The Society is a member of the European Federation of Geologists.

The Society also publishes Géologues, Géochronique, Mémoires Nouvelle Série (Memoirs), and Mémoires Hors Série (Occasional Papers).
