= Mediterranean Ridge =

Seabed ridge south of Greece

Coordinates: 33.5°N 25.0°E

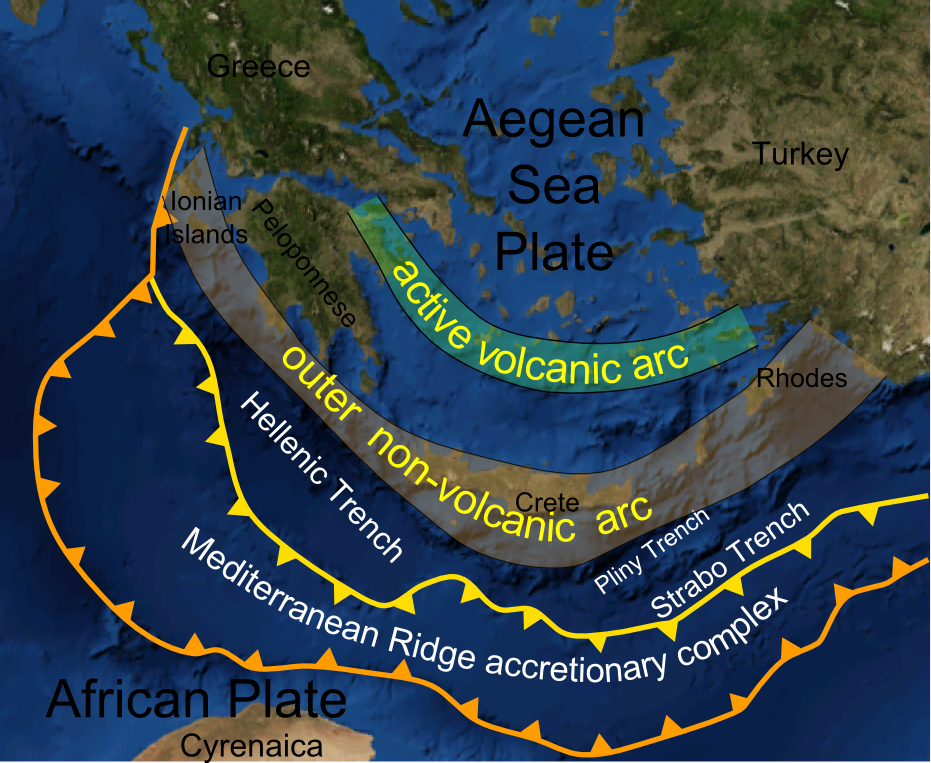
Location of the ridge

The Mediterranean Ridge is a wide ridge in the bed of the Mediterranean Sea, running along a rough quarter circle from Calabria, south of Crete, to the southwest corner of Turkey.

It is an accretionary wedge caused by the African Plate subducting under the Eurasian and Anatolian plates. As the African Plate moves slowly north-northeastward, the sedimentary rocks covering the Mediterranean seafloor are being affected by active shortening, involving both thrust faulting and folding, lifting them up and forming the ridge.

Along the ridge, five deep basins full of anoxic brine have been found (including the L'Atalante basin), where Messinian evaporite deposits of brine caught up in this ongoing orogeny have dissolved.

== Incipient collision with Africa ==
The central section of the Mediterranean Ridge shows evidence for the initial stages of collision with the Cyrenaica peninsula. Detailed bathymetric mapping using multibeam echosounders, shows that deformation within the "outer zone" (southernmost part) of the ridge, is much more intense against the promontory, with out-of-sequence thrusting replacing the gentle folding observed further east and west.

== See also ==
- Malta Escarpment
- Campi Flegrei del Mar di Sicilia
- Palinuro Seamount
- Calypso Deep
- Hellenic Trench
- Eratosthenes Seamount
