= Foundling Mick =

1893 novel by Jules Verne

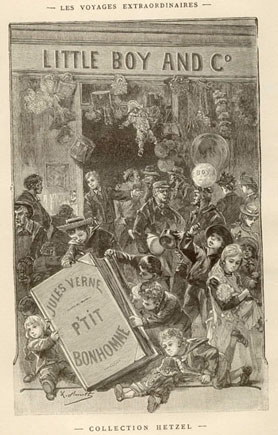
- Author: Jules Verne
- Original title: P'tit-Bonhomme
- Illustrator: Léon Benett
- Language: French
- Series: The Extraordinary Voyages #39
- Genre: Adventure novel
- Publisher: Pierre-Jules Hetzel
- Publication date: 1893
- Publication place: France
- English publication date: 1895
- Media type: Print (Hardback)
- Preceded by: Claudius Bombarnac
- Followed by: Captain Antifer

Foundling Mick (French: P'tit-Bonhomme, 1893) is an adventure novel written by Jules Verne. The social elements of this novel seem to be inspired by the works of Charles Dickens.

== Plot ==
In 1875, in Ireland, Foundling Mick, an orphan like many at that time, is first exploited by a puppeteer. Compassionate people then place him in a school for the underprivileged, where he is hardly better off. He survives thanks to Grip, a teenager who takes him under his protection.

After a fire destroys the school, an extravagant young actress takes him in but abruptly gets rid of him after pampering him. Moved by the toddler’s distress, a family of farmers, the McCarthys, adopt him. He spends four happy years with them until they are brutally evicted for non-payment of rent, separating him from the family.

As he grows, Foundling Mick dreams of becoming an important merchant. After a brief stay with an arrogant young count, he sets up a tiny traveling business with the help of Bob, a little vagabond he saved from drowning. The two children take three months to reach Dublin, where they save enough money to rent premises in a working-class neighborhood. They set up a bazaar specializing mainly in toys and begin to attract a loyal clientele. Advised by his landlord, Foundling Mick cautiously but cleverly develops his business, even buying the cargo of a ship, which allows him to add a grocery section to his store.

His success does not make him forget those who helped him in difficult times. He reunites the dispersed McCarthy family and offers them the money needed to buy back their old farm. Moreover, he takes his friend Grip as a partner and arranges for him to marry Sissy, the cashier of the bazaar. At sixteen years old, Foundling Mick has reached an enviable situation, and everything suggests that he will go even further and realize his childhood dreams.

== English titles ==
In addition to Foundling Mick, the novel has been published under several different English titles:

- A Lad of Grit
- The Extraordinary Adventures of Foundling Mick

== Publication history ==
- 1894, UK, London: Sampson Low, Marston and Co., First English edition
- 1933, Ireland, Dublin: The Educational Company of Ireland (Talbot Press), as A Lad of Grit
- 2008, Ireland, Dublin: Royal Irish Academy, new translation by Kieran O'Driscoll, as The Extraordinary Adventures of Foundling Mick
