= Strait of Sicily =

Strait between Sicily and Tunisia

- Location within Europe

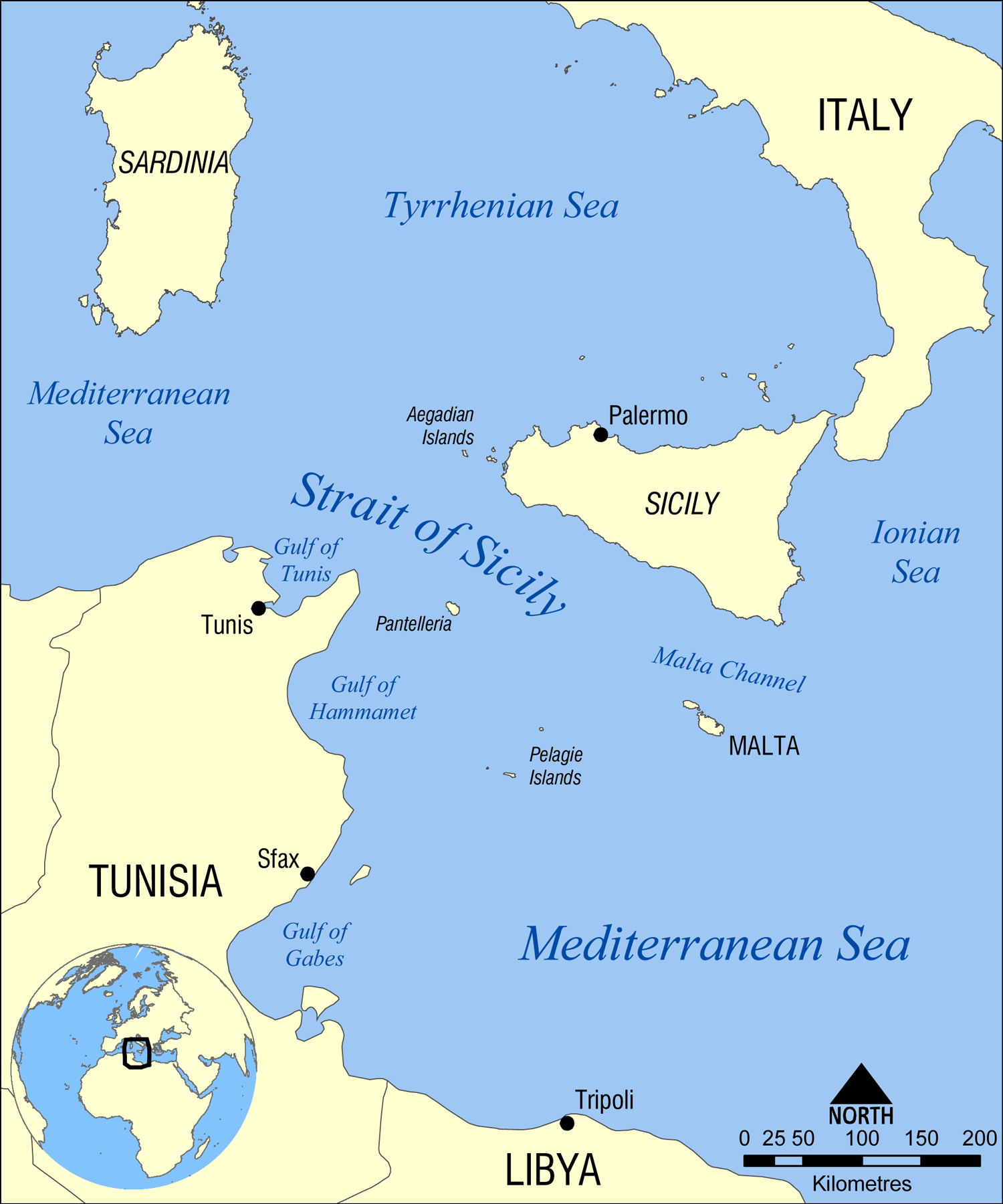
- Map showing the location of the Strait of Sicily
- Coordinates: 37.20°N 11.20°E
- Basin countries: Italy, Tunisia
- Max. width: 145 kilometres (78 nmi; 90 mi)
- Max. depth: 316 meters (1,037 ft)

The Strait of Sicily (also known as Sicilian Strait, Sicilian Channel, Channel of Sicily, Sicilian Narrows, Strait of Tunis, and Pantelleria Channel; Italian: Canale di Sicilia or the Stretto di Sicilia; Sicilian: Canali di Sicilia or Strittu di Sicilia, Arabic: مضيق صقلية Maḍīq Ṣiqillīyah or مضيق الوطن القبلي Maḍīq al-Waṭan al-Qiblī) is the strait between Sicily and Tunisia. The strait is about 145 kilometres (90 mi) wide and divides the Tyrrhenian Sea and the western Mediterranean Sea, from the eastern Mediterranean Sea. The maximum depth is 316 meters (1,037 ft). The island of Pantelleria lies in the middle of the strait.

There are regular ferries between Sicily and Tunis across the Strait of Sicily; a tunnel has been proposed to link the two regions.

Due to its historical importance and strategic location at the exact center of the sea, the strait earned its title as the Crossroads of the Mediterranean.

== Flows ==
Deep currents in the strait flow from east to west, and the current nearer the surface travels from west to east. This unusual water flow is of interest to oceanographers. Within the Central Mediterranean Sea it is one of the topographically complex regions. With a length of 600 km (370 mi) it connects the Eastern and Western Mediterranean basins. The strait is delimited by two systems; at the eastern side it is connected with the Ionian Sea, south of the Malta Bank with a sill of 560 m deep, and, on the western side, two passages connect the strait with the Western Mediterranean basin. The passage or channel more closely to Sicily is narrow and around 430 m deep while the channel at the side of Tunisia is broader and shallower with a maximum depth of 365 m. Due to this particular bathymetry with two different channels, the strait is called a "two-sill strait". In the central region the strait is around 50 km to 100 km wide and 700 m to 900 m deep, but some parts consist of trenches of even 1,800 m deep.

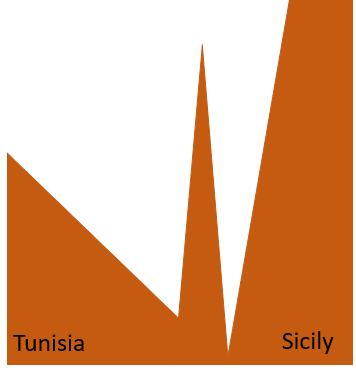
Basic scheme of the two-sill system in the Strait of Sicily.

At the surface and in the upper 200 m the strait consists of an eastward flow provided by the Modified Atlantic Water (MAW). Underneath this eastward flow, the Levantine Intermediate Water (LIW) flows in westward direction. Just above the bottom of the Strait a relative small flow has been observed. This vein follows the same route as LIW but has different characteristics. The water flow is named 'transitional Eastern Mediterranean Deep Water' (tEMDW) and contains fresher, colder and denser (with a potential seawater density, σ_{θ,} of around 29.10) water than the LIW. In the Ionian Sea it fills the transitional layer between the Eastern Mediterranean Deep Water and the LIW. This dense water exits the strait at a depth of 300 m at the sill and sinks, because of its higher density than the LIW, until 1,800 m when reaching the Tyrrhenian Sea flowing along the Sicilian slope.

This sharp sinking of the dense water flow is a topic of interest among oceanographers. A second topic of interest regarding this little tEMDW flow is that it crosses the midline of the strait, more precisely the Malta sill. When the dense water flow reaches the western sill, it flows along the Tunisian coast instead of the Sicilian shelf. The water mass flows at a shallow depth of 300 m, while beneath the LIW, the tEMDW flows westward. Further downstream, the LIW has lower velocities and the dense water flow returns to the geostrophic position located naturally along the Sicilian coast. Here the dense water sinks into the deeper ocean sea, around 1,500–1,850 m. This inversion of the interface slope is possible because the buoyancy and Coriolis forces are balancing each other in a so-called 'geostrophic balance' which is possible because of the flow velocities of both LIW and EMDW. The tEMDW shows little variations in height, width and path and is thus geometrically quite stable.

== Dynamics ==
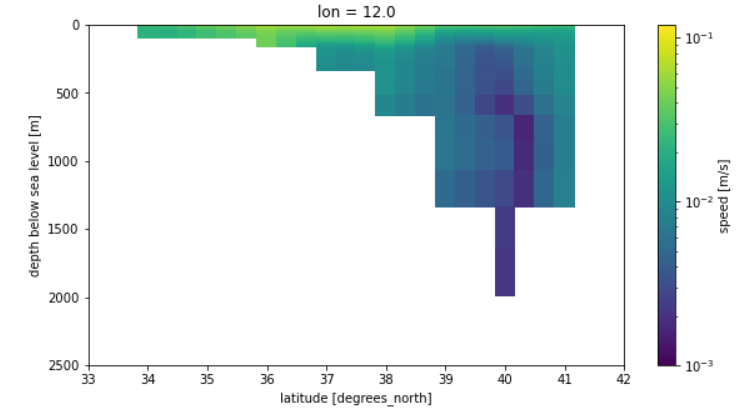
Cross section of the Strait of Sicily using the horizontal and vertical component of the current from the GODAS data file of 2020.

The Central Mediterranean can be characterized by looking at differences in spatial and temporal scale. Three scales are common to use among oceanographers. The first is the mesoscale with a horizontal scale around ten kilometers and periods of days till a maximum of ten days. The sea can be influenced within the mesoscale by wind stress, topography and by internal dynamical processes. Boundary currents and jets can be created by these processes which can evolve into vortices and filament patterns that can interact with large scale flows.

The second is the sub-basin scale with scales of 200 km till 300 km. This scale represents two dense water veins; the Atlantic Tunisian Current (ATC) which flows along the African coast and the Atlantic Ionian Stream (AIS) along the Sicilian coast. The AIS flows mainly eastward which can create upwelling on the Adventure Bank (AB) and the southern Sicilian coast. Upwelling is found to be the most intense during summer when the AIS is also relatively stronger than in other seasons. Due to the upwelling these coasts are of great interests of fishery. The ATC shows a specific path in winter while the route is less clearly-marked during summer.

The last common used scale is the large Mediterranean Basin scale which includes the thermohaline circulation. The thermohaline circulation in the Strait of Sicily is anti-estuarine and is driven by, at one site, the fresh waters entering from the Gibraltar Strait and on the other side, the negative freshwater budget from the Mediterranean Basin. Also the westward LIW in the intermediate layer and less saltier eastward Atlantic water on top are considered in this scale.

The outflow of dense-water-masses characteristics of the Strait of Sicily are not stable but have been found to change interannually. Also the thermohaline circulation showed changes in structure and stratification. These changes were caused by deep water formed in the Aegean Sea which replaced the water formed in the Adriatic during the 1990s. This dense water caused enhanced salinity and temperatures in the Aegean Sea for a few years creating the deep/mediate Mediterranean overturning perturbation which has been given the name of Eastern Mediterranean Transient (EMT). The EMT is the major perturbation of the circulation and water mass aspects in this area since systematic observational data is available (1950s). The effect of the EMT on the Strait of Sicily was a freshening of the surface waters.

Another important circulation mechanism that exists in the Strait of Sicily is the Bimodal Oscillating System (BiOS), a feedback mechanism between the Ionic and the Adriatic sea. The thermohaline properties of the Adriatic Sea show quasi-decadal oscillations that are related to the circulation of the Ionian Sea. The upper-layer of the northern Ionian Sea shows circulations that vary between a cyclonic movement, corresponding advection of waters from the Eastern Mediterranean with very saline waters and low nutrients (oligotrophic water), and anticyclonic movement which results in saline and copiotroph (nutrient-rich) waters from the Western Mediterranean towards the Adriatic. The density of the dense waters that flow from the Adriatic Sea into the northern Ionian Sea highly depends on the type of circulation (cyclonic, or anticyclonic) in the Ionian Sea and at the other hand influences the vorticity in the Ionian Sea itself resulting in a feedback mechanism. BiOS is one of the dominant mechanisms influencing biochemical processes in the Adriatic and therefore has great impact on the organisms within this sea and in the strait.

== Levantine intermediate water circulation ==
Through the strait of Sicily passes the Levantine Intermediate Water (LIW). The LIW is a westward flowing water mass in the intermediate layers (from 200 m till 400 m) formed in the Levantine basin, the most eastern part of the Mediterranean sea and ending in the strait of Gibraltar and the Atlantic Ocean. The LIW is characterized by high salinity and temperature. This high salinity concentrations is one of the important factors for the formation of the deep water in the Southern Adriatic and the Gulf of Lions.

During the past years (measured from 1993 till 1998) the potential temperature and salinity of the LIW have decreased significantly. This change in thermohaline properties of the LIW is in agreement with another event that occurred in the 1990s which is the uplifting of the colder and less saline deep waters in the Eastern Mediterranean referred as the Eastern Mediterranean Transient (EMT).

== Migrants ==
Pantelleria is an Italian island located in the Strait of Sicily around 64 km from Tunisia. Nowadays the island is one of the destinations migrants, mostly from Tunisia, try to reach. Sometimes over 200 people in only two days cross the strait in little boats.

== Winds ==
The winds that are found above the Strait of Sicily are the two Mediterranean winds: Sirocco, bringing dry and warm air from the South East and Mistral, bringing cold air from the northwest.

== Biology ==
The Strait of Sicily is rich in biodiversity due to its different water currents. Also its geographical position between the Eastern and Western Mediterranean contributes to the high ecological importance of the strait. Warm temperature and tropical species from the Lavantin basin cross the strait. The vast variety in species cannot only be found near the surface and coasts but also the deep water contains communities of vulnerable species as the Scleractinia, Antipatharians, gorgonians and red corals.

The Corallium rubrum, family of the Coralliidae (Anthozoa, Gorgonacea) lives in the strait, between a few meters to 120 meters deep. Its bright red calcific axis has been used for jewelry from ancient times. Although extinction of these corals is not the case yet because of high productivity in this ecosystem, a decline has been observed in the shallow waters.

These corals are part of an initiative of worldwide conservation. During the Conference of the Parties of CITES number 14 (CoP14) two workshops were decided to be organized about the corals in the Pacific and Mediterranean.

Among the species that are fished at high rates are cephalopods. These molluscans, especially the species O. Vulgaris, are of interest both for industrial and artisanal fisheries.

Due to high biodiversity, productivity rates and importance of the different species for the ecosystem, the Mediterranean Sea and the Strait of Sicily are becoming of more interest for researchers during the recent years.

== Volcanic activity ==
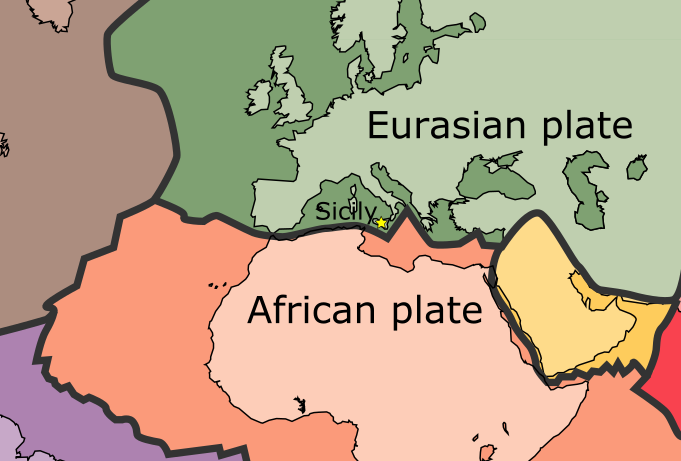
Tectonic Plates underneath the Strait of Sicily.

Due to the natural position of the Strait of Sicily, above the conjunction of the Eurasian and African tectonic plate, volcanic activity occurs in the strait.

Volcanic activity is mainly focused on the islands Pantelleria and Linosa. A climax in volcanic activity was found in the Pleistocene. Minor submarine eruptions still occur, mostly on the seafloor along the northwest and southeast regional faults.

During historical times some seamounts erupted, and other seamounts have been covered by Pliocene-Quaternary sediments.

The submarine volcanoes are located in the Adventure Plateau, Graham and Nameless Banks. In 1831 a submarine volcano erupted on the Graham Bank at a depth of around 200 m, forming the Graham Island, 65 m above sea level. The island was claimed by Britain, France, and Sicily, with the potential for hostilities, but it had been washed away by December 1831. (In November 2000 Sicilians planted a flag on the underwater volcano to claim the island if it resurfaced.) In the year 1863 this volcano also erupted. As of 2023 the most recent eruption in the region was in 1891, around 5 km north of Pantelleria. At the southeast of Graham Bank, at the Pinne Bank an emission was observed in 1941.

In 2023 three further underwater volcanoes, possibly active, were discovered off Sicily.

== See also ==
- Italy–Tunisia Delimitation Agreement
