= Hellenic Trench =

Long narrow depression bordering the Aegean Sea to the south

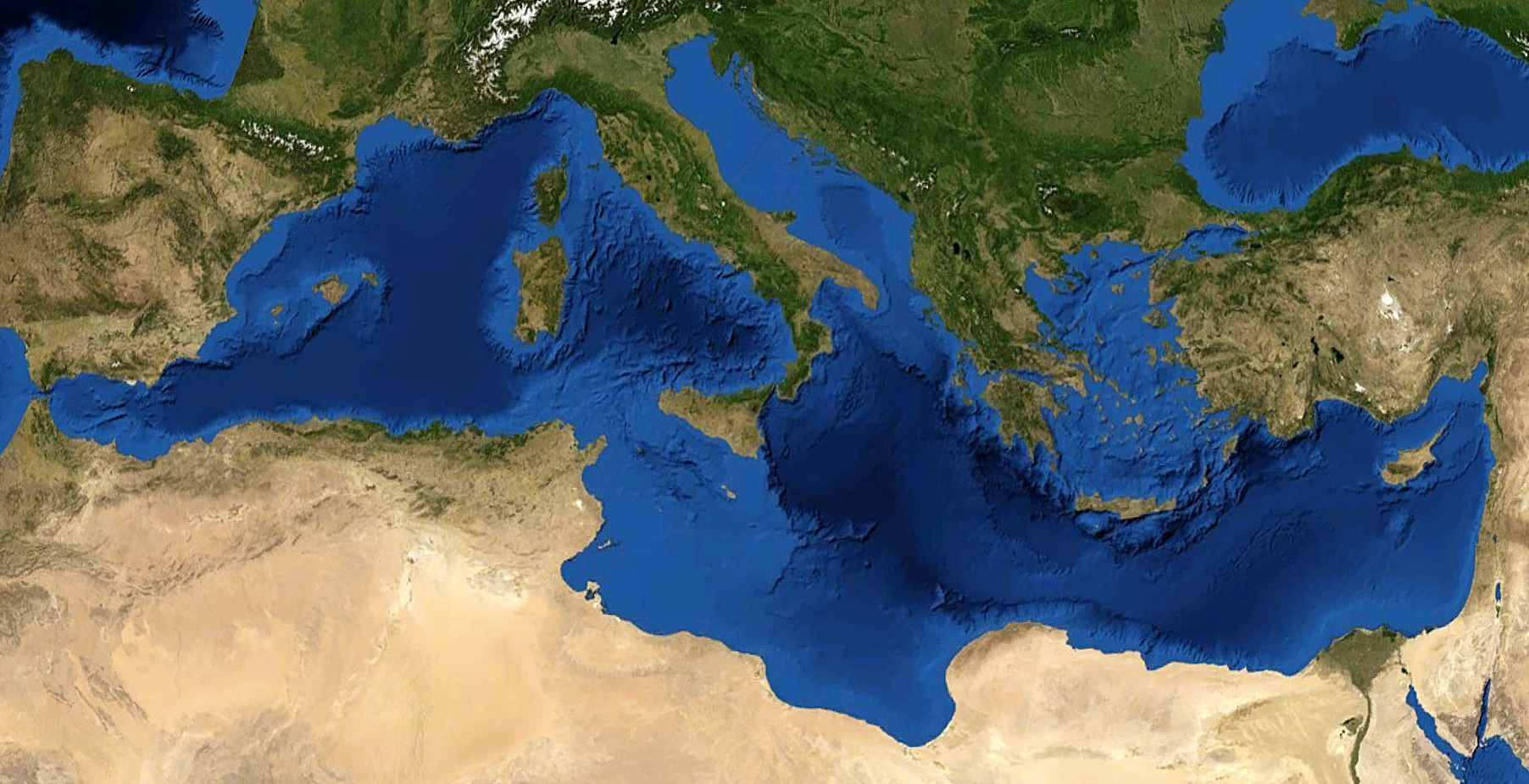
- Bathymetric view of the Mediterranean. The light blue region between mainland Greece and Anatolia represents the Aegean Sea and most of the Aegean Plate on which it is situated. These waters are relatively shallow. The southern margin is occupied by the Hellenic arc, a range of mountains and islands. Parallel to its southern edge is the deep-water Hellenic Trench, at the bottom of which is the line of subduction, a convergent consuming boundary, which is gradually pushed to the south by back-arc extension.

- Hellas and the Aegean Sea middle arc (Greece)
- Etymology: Republic of Hellas (Greece)
- Location: Off the south coast of Crete is at about the center of the trench's arc
- Coordinates: 34°45′10.5″N 24°52′15.3″E
- Country: Greece
- Region: Southern margin of the Aegean Sea

Characteristics
- Length: ESE leg, or Hellenic Trench proper, 600 kilometres (370 mi); ENE leg, HT by analogy, 400 kilometres (250 mi)
- Strike: ESE Cephallenia to Crete, ENE Crete to Rhodes.
- Dip: ESE leg average 35° to the NE; ENE leg average 50°, either side

Tectonics
- Type: The ESE leg is mainly reverse dip-slip. The ENE leg is mainly strike-slip or oblique.

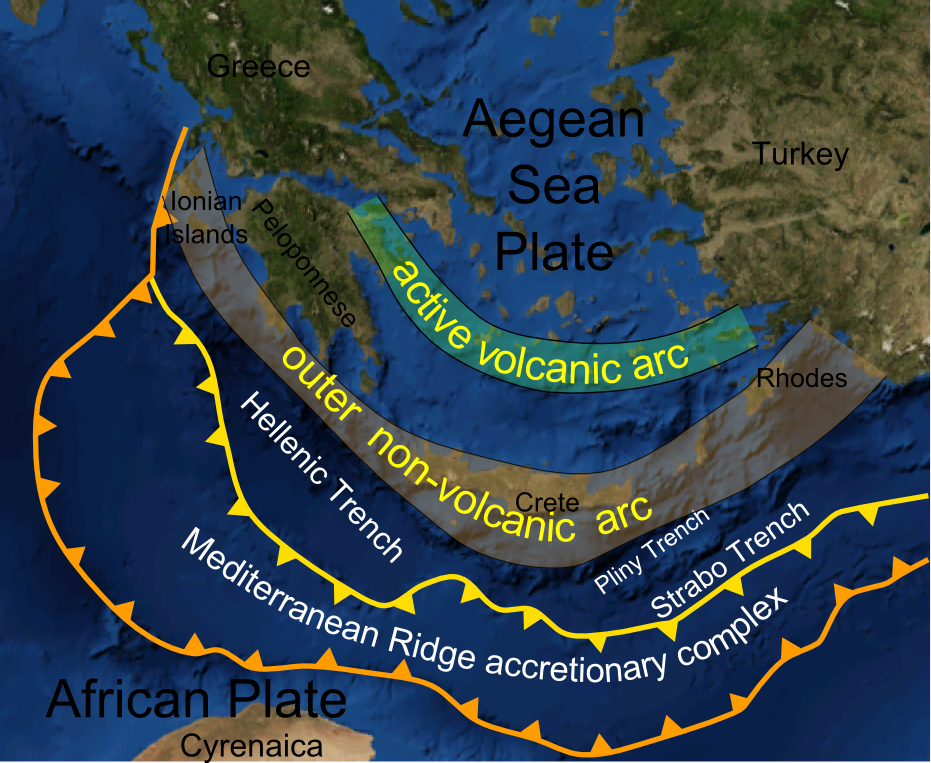
The Hellenic Trench, with the inner South Aegean Volcanic Arc, and the outer non-volcanic Hellenic arc

The Hellenic Trench (HT) is an oceanic trough located in the forearc of the Hellenic arc, an arcuate archipelago on the southern margin of the Aegean Sea plate, or Aegean Plate, also called Aegea, the basement of the Aegean Sea. The HT begins in the Ionian Sea near the mouth of the Gulf of Corinth and curves to the south, following the margin of the Aegean Sea. It passes close to the south shore of Crete and ends near the island of Rhodes just offshore Anatolia.

In the classical theory of its origin the HT is an oceanic trench containing the Hellenic subduction zone, directly related to the subduction of the African plate under the Eurasian plate. Alternate views developed later on additional data question the classical view postulating that the HT may be the result wholly or partially of back-arc extension and slab rollback. The "partial" view hypothesizes that the western leg of the HT, Ionian Sea east to eastern Crete, exhibits the line of subduction and therefore is an oceanic trench. The "not at all" view, relying on the theory that the subduction line is under or south of the Mediterranean Ridge, questions whether any of the HT is currently subductional. If not, it is merely a legacy, a remnant of a previous subduction zone that has gone elsewhere. (Note: The morphology of the Hellenic Trench is currently a topic of active research. The traditional view is that the trench extended to the east of the entire Hellenic Arc. That some evidence of subduction did so is not in question. Whether the current trench does so is in question. The best proper terminology is being debated in various articles. This article follows the convention generally but relates questions where relevant.)

North of this subduction the Adriatic or Apulian Plate subducts under the Balkans. More recently and rarely the terms "North Hellenic Subduction" and "North Hellenic Trench" have been applied there, rendering the HT and HS into the "South HT" and "South HS." The distinction is based on a differentation of North Hellenides from South Hellenides. The dividing feature is the Gulfs of Patras and Corinth. From their vicinity and southward an extensional regime prevails, while the north remains in a compressional. The Hellenides are the mountains of Greece, divided into an inner and outer range. The extensional regime cuts across them transversely, producing four quarters. The South Hellenic Subduction Zone, and the Hellenic Trench, if different (many still consider them not to be so) are located in the southern outer Hellenides.

Meanwhile, the deep basins of the Trench and their marine ecologies are the homes of a number of marine mammals, such as Cetaceans, some of which are endangered species threatened by maritime traffic in the Eastern Mediterranean.

The study of the overall features of the surface of the Earth has been the concern of plate tectonics since the Plate Tectonics Revolution of the 1970s. It was a development of the continental drift theory of Alfred Wegener. These features are often called lineaments. The Hellenic Trench along with the Hellenic Arc and other related features are lineaments important to the geology primarily of Greece and secondarily of Turkey.

Morphology or geomorphology studies the "shapes" (morphai) of the lineaments, while kinesiology studies their "motions" (kineseis). Both topics as used typically in geology articles do not go beyond plane geometry, trigonometry, elementary algebra, and elementary statistics, which are taught at the high school level. More daunting are the geologic special terms, which are numerous, and continue to be innovated. This article assumes basic knowledge of mathematics and science, but includes parenthetical clues as to the meaning of the special terms as well as links to articles explaining them.

== Hellenic subduction zone ==
=== Subduction applied to the trench ===
In subduction one plate dives under another at a convergent plate boundary and the band across this line is termed the subduction, or more rarely subductive, zone. It features an upper plate and a lower plate. The initial line of the subduction, traditionally believed to be located in the trench, and to be at the foot of the margin of the overriding plate, has a direction, the strike. The plate diving down does so at an angle, the dip. The direction of dip is roughly perpendicular, or normal, to the strike (not to be confused with a normal fault). It goes under the highlands raised by the collision, in this case the Hellenic arc. The two plates moving across each other (a dip-slip movement) generate earthquakes, so the subducted part of the plate is basically a seismic zone, called the Wadati–Benioff zone.

As it turns out, further research on the Hellenic Trench revealed that the concept of a subductive trench, where subduction is occurring now (if that is what it is), would only strictly apply to the west side; moreover, not all the subduction, wherever it does occur, is due to plate collision. The east side of the trench is not a trench but is a series of ascending scarps of faults where strike slippage is the main movement, due to further complexities discovered later (see this article, below).

However, the term "trench" and the concept of "subductive zone" continue to be used of the whole arc, sometimes in questioning quotes, by some sort of analogy, perhaps because the zone once was or could be a convergent subductive plate border. The basis of the analogy is the Hellenic arc, the raised border. It could not have been raised all the way around without a subduction zone all the way around. The search for data revealing possible reasons for the asymmetry is an area of active research.

If the problem is in part a matter of definition of terms, then the answer as far as it goes is a matter of redefinition. One redefinition distinguishes the Hellenic Trench from the Hellenic Trough, or Hellenic Subduction Trough. The Trench is only the foredeep of the Hellenic arc on the west side. (Note: Most recently geologic researchers have found a way to summarize complex bathymetry, or "measurement of the deep," by referencing the strength of the gravitational field in the atmosphere at the oceanic surface. Highlands, which have more mass, have a slightly stronger gravitational field, while depressions have a weaker, hence the "gravity trough.") It is possibly the location of the line of subduction, but the subduction begins with the first flexure of the African plate downward (deformation front), which at least one source places at the Libyan continental margin. The Mediterranean Ridge is in this theory an accretionary complex associated with the subduction; that is, a collection of loose material left over from previous subduction. The term "subduction zone" also includes the slab of the overridden Wadati–Benioff zone. These definitions appear to solve the contradiction of the Hellenic Trench not going far enough around the arc to account for the eastern side. The Trough and the zone go all the way around.

=== Subduction zone geometry ===
==== Hellenic Arc amphitheater ====
The Hellenic Arc seen on a map or in high-altitude photographs appears to be, if not actually is, an amphitheater, at least a bilaterally symmetrical arc about a N–S axis, with vertex on Crete, opening to the north. The wings of the arc are somewhat flatter than the vertex. The radius has been calculated at 400 kilometres (250 mi), which places the center at about 38°30′00″N 25°30′00″E, in the middle of the north Aegean Sea. The parallel trend of the volcanic arc at a radius of 200 kilometres (120 mi) seems to give some approximate verification.

One might suppose at first glance that some anomalous curvature of the African plate had surrounded the Aegean Sea and was compressing it inward toward a point in the north Aegean, and that one might expect a mountain range to arise there. The western side of the trench has the appropriate faulting, a destructive convergent border in a reverse fault with a dip under the Hellenic Arc perpendicular to the strike.

Further investigation in the second half of the 20th century soon quelled any such speculation. A plate-compressive velocity of the Hellenic Arc ought to have been in evidence, given the precision with which GPS can measure geological movement. Instead all investigations began to report a closure of the Hellenic Arc on the coast of Africa (or Nubia as is currently said) at various estimated rates that were far larger than the small rate of convergence of Africa on Eurasia.

==== Aegean Plate extension ====
The expected closure of the Hellenic Arc on the north Aegean turned out to be a vigorous motion in the opposite direction, a theoretical paradox requiring additional geological theory to explain. The final solutions were back-arc extension and slab rollback. As the subducting plate, or slab, rolls under the overriding plate, an arc of highlands is pushed up on the margin of the overriding plate. For reasons still not entirely understood, the back of the arc begins to thin and extend, pushing the arc in a "back" direction projectively across the foredeep. This extension may or may not happen in a subduction, but if it does, the spread is like the expansion of space, applicable everywhere, but only in a given direction. The entire Aegean Plate comes from this extension behind the Hellenic Arc. Circles on the early plate would eventually have become ellipses pointing in the direction of expansion.

The Aegean Plate stretches out to the south, becoming thin and shallow, allowing a volcanic arc to break out 200 kilometres (120 mi) to the north of the Hellenic Arc, which is moving to the south on the edge of the extension. There are two layers on the overriding plate margin: the contact surface with the subducting plate, and a thinned surface layer moving "back." As it does the trench must move back, "consuming" more plate. The mechanism is that the slab flexes down ("deformation front") further and further back, a phenomenon called "slab roll back."

In geologic terminology, the part of the plate rolling under is termed "negatively buoyant," meaning the segment of combined overriding and overridden plates have not found the depth at which they float over the mantle. One study notes that the rollback of the HT is so severe that the negative buoyancy is the major cause of subduction; that is, northward thrusting of the African plate still is present, but the slab has already started to flex long before it gets to the point where thrusting makes a difference. But there are other complexities as well.

==== Hellenic Trough morphology ====
A number of mapping techniques have been applied to research the arc zone, such as seafloor mapping, reflection seismology, and application of the Global Positioning System, which can detect changes of position in millimeters; i.e., geologic movement, good for measuring geologic velocities. The work done so far indicates that the appearance of symmetry is an illusion based on the shape of the forearc; that is, on the raised arc of the margin of the overriding plate.

Bathymetric representations of the Hellenic Trench to the south of the arc depict a different shape. As far as the major parameters are concerned: fault type, dip, depth, velocity, seismicity, etc., the subduction zone in the trench is asymmetric, which some consider a unique distinction. The zone begins near the Gulf of Corinth and trends ESE in an arc approximating a straight line. It terminates to the south of Crete in an angular vertex.

This leg of the HT contains mainly dip-slip faults (a hanging wall slips up or down over the dip of a floor wall). North of its end on the west another subduction zone is created by the Adriatic plate diving under the Balkans, which are in the Eurasian plate proper, and not the Aegean Plate. The subduction line between the two is not continuous; there is a gap of about 100 kilometres (62 mi). Between the south end of the Adriatic plate subduction and the north end of the Aegean Plate subduction is the Kephallenia Fault Zone (KFZ), or Kephallenia Transform Fault (KTF), or Cephalonia–Lefkada Transform Fault Zone (CTF). (Note: The transform fault is a strike-slip fault (a hanging wall slips along the strike of a floor wall).) The Aegean Plate slips along the side of the Adriatic plate in a SSW direction.

A second leg trends N60E, (Note: An azimuth in the US army system of bearings. It gives the number of degrees to the east of north on a 360° compass with N at 0°.) which is ENE, to the island of Rhodes, where it ceases. There is not a singular vertex. Prior to reaching its end point the ESE leg has two more vertices, so that the ENE leg is distributed into three ENE lines, the Ptolemy Trench, the Pliny Trench outside of and parallel to it, and the outer Strabo Trench, parallel to the other two. The overall appearance resembles an arc inscribed in a vertex angle, except for the asymmetry.

The three trenches fall short of Rhodes, the Strabo Trench going the farthest east. Between it and the Cyprus Trench are the Anaximander Mountains, a submarine range thought to be the subduction arc of the African plate under the Anatolian plate. (Note: Writers trying to summarize the complex geological circumstances sometimes bundle the Cyprus Trench with the Hellenic Trench. More technically, they are not considered the same, as different plates and different parameters are involved.) The Strabo Trench does not connect with it. Instead there is a gap, the Rhodian Basin. On its north boundary is the Rhodian Fault, trending NNE, and making the final connection to the Anatolian Fault.

==== Length of the Hellenic trough ====
The linear distance of around the trough depends on its definition. Various estimates are available. The main requirements for definition are two end points and the shape of the path between them. One source specifying end points of "37.5°N 20.0°E offshore the island of Zakynthos" and "36.0°N 29.0°E offshore of the island of Rhodes" offers an arcuate distance of 1,200 kilometres (750 mi) for "the arc," here used loosely. Neither coordinates are on or next to the Hellenic Arc; rather, the line (approximated by the method of small straight segments on the map) to achieve 1200 km must follow the outer edge of the foredeep zone, located toward the midline of the Hellenic Trough. Being further out on the radius of the Arc as a segment of a circle, it has a longer peripheral distance. In this definition "the arc" is both the Hellenic Arc and its foredeep, measured on the outer periphery. The northern end point is more solid, being located on or near the Cephalonia–Lefkada Transform Fault Zone, generally agreed to be the northern edge of the subduction zone. The southern end point is placed arbitrarily in the Rhodes Basin at the end of the Hellenic subduction. No point chosen there would cause significant variation in the 1200 km length.

Another source concentrates on the line of subduction, which is an angle at the intersection of two roughly straight lines (see article above). The vertex is to the south of Crete. A leg bears to the NW from there and is 600 kilometres (370 mi) long. The line is a scarp, though not visible because the trench has filled with sediment. A second leg bears to the NE and is 400 kilometres (250 mi) long, for a total of 1,000 kilometres (620 mi), which is also the southern peripheral distance around the Hellenic Arc.

The Arc is arcuate; the angle is straight lines, another paradox, if one assumes a single subduction. The general geologic answer is that the subduction due to the compression of Africa against Eurasia is a different movement from the southward thrusting of the Aegean Plate. There are two different resultants of all the small motion vectors. The subduction is not at 90° to the NW-bearing scarp, but is at 70°–75°. The scarp is believed to be rotating CW away from perpendicularity.

=== Geologic history of the current regime ===
Initially the trench was considered the surface expression of African and Eurasian plate collision. Such a view could not be verified because the trench was full of obscuring sediment, and because the arc-shaped Mediterranean Ridge seemed part of the subduction complex. If the strike of the subducting plate is in the Hellenic Trench (often termed "the classical view"), then it is far distant from the accretionary ridge supposed to have been accreted there.

Subsequent data, especially earthquake, made possible other theories. Perhaps the bottom of the trench did not connect with (was decoupled from) the subducting plate at all but was a "pull apart" fault basin in the forearc (the raised chain of highlands and islands), or perhaps it was part of a wrinkle in the foredeep produced by compressional motion of the Aegean Plate against the "backstop" of the Mediterranean Ridge. Or, perhaps it was a normal fault, a "half-graben" produced by extension of the Aegean Plate.

In these other theories, the subducting plate would start its subduction under the Mediterranean Ridge, and pass under the Hellenic Trench decoupled from it. However, it cannot be seen under the ridge. Moreover, the Hellenic Arc would not be the forearc, the edge of the Aegean Plate, but this edge would be hidden under the ridge. It would now be necessary to find a reason for the trench. Opinions vary. The search goes on. (Note: Most geological or quasi-geological maps of the feature show a toothed line to represent the subduction, with the teeth pointing to the overriding plate. The strikes of any of these lines are entirely hypothetical. Another device is the profile, a cross-section of the subduction zone. It may show the trench reaching the slab or not, but the depiction is entirely hypothetical. Different depictions depend on different types of data. A total morphology has yet to be acquired.)

Historical geology offers reasons for hypothesizing that, in its earlier development, there was one trench traversing what is now the Aegean, and that it contained the subduction zone and the edge of the Eurasian Continent.

==== The compressional regime ====
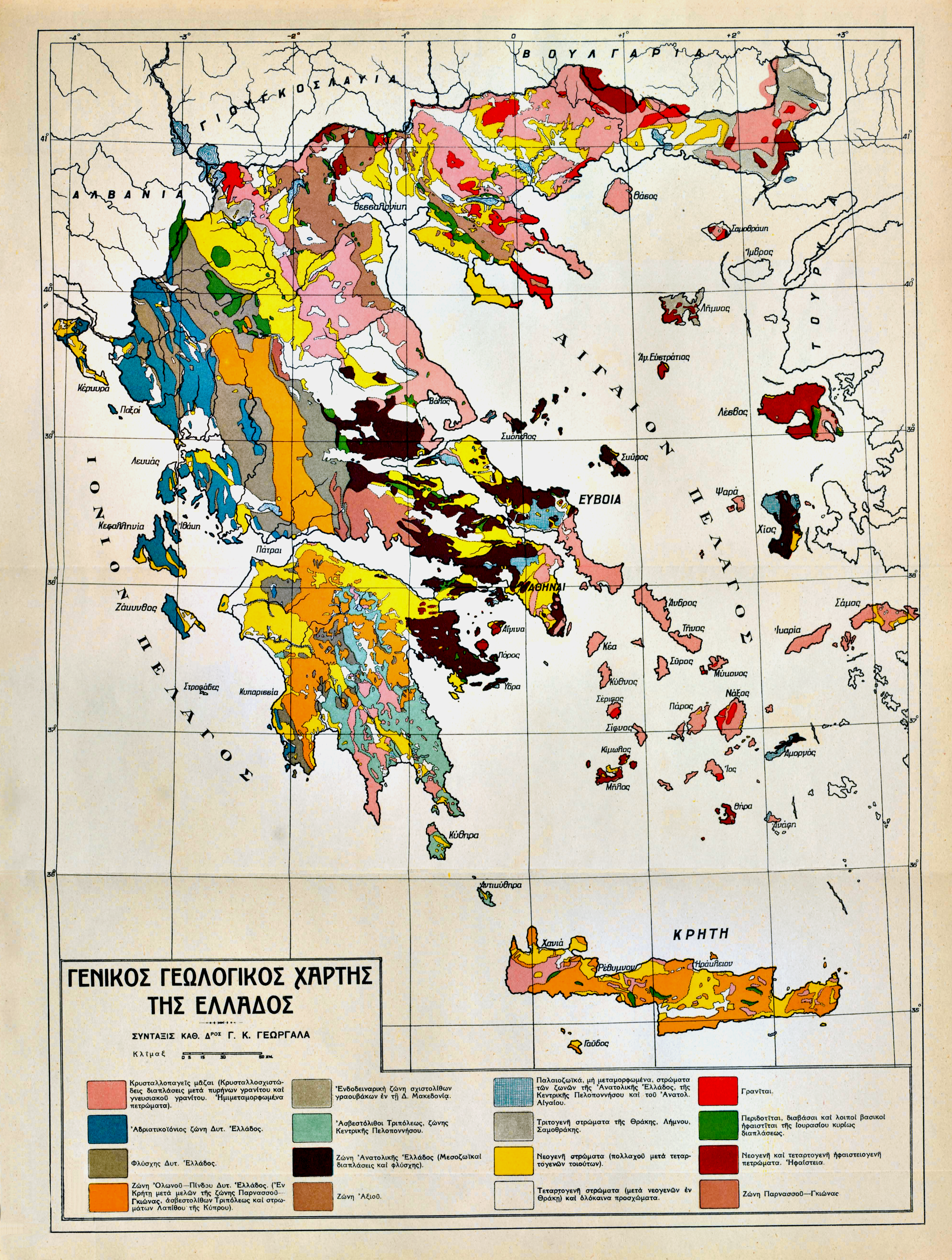
Isopic zones of Greece. Aqua: "Adriatic", or Ionian, zone. The last to be docked, in place N of the KTF, extended into the islands S of it. Beige: Pindos zone, docked prior to the Ionian. Appears in Central Greece, Peloponnesus, Crete. The Corinthian Gulf, a pull-apart, transects it. Yellow: "Neogene" (extensional) regions.

If one imagines all the geologic changes brought about by extension to be reversed, then all the islands descend from an ancestral Hellenic Arc traversing the North Aegean. The Gulf of Patras was closed, as well as the Gulf of Corinth. Lefkadi, Ithaki, and Kefalonia were telescoped into a single ancestor. The Adriatic plate and the Ionian Plate (under the Ionian Sea) were one. Zakynthos was in the line of islands at the edge of the future border between the two plates. Greece lacked its current projection into the Aegean; in fact, the Aegean was not there.

At this stage, as early as 30 MYA in the Oligocene, the mainland of the Balkans had been formed by successive waves of subduction of the African plate under the Eurasian, called "thrusts" (Note: A thrust fault is a reverse fault with an angle less than 45 degrees, which most subductions are.) from their thrusting of the Eurasian plate to the NE. The various forearcs, or "thrust sheets," created by this thrusting had moved to the north and had docked against the preceding, closing the ancient seas between them. Each forearc was a complex of folds, or "nappes," raised by compression (or "shortening of the crust"), which had a tendency to fall over, creating tilted layers exposed later in highlands.

The general hypothesis is that throughout these successive subductions there was only one subduction zone acting continuously to convey (as on a conveyor belt) and emplace (obduct) microcontinents broken from the African slab. Between each microcontinent was a local ocean, which was subducted and closed in turn: in the Cenozoic the Vardar, 1,000 kilometres (620 mi) subducted; the Pindos, 500 kilometres (310 mi) subducted; and the eastern Mediterranean, still being suducted. Between the Vardar and the Pindos was the Pelagian microcontinent; between the Pindos and the Mediterranean was the Apulian (or Adriatic) microcontinent, with 900 kilometres (560 mi) subducted for the two, amounting to a closure of 2,400 kilometres (1,500 mi) between Africa and Eurasia. Individual subductions thus varied between Oceanic and Continental, the current being Oceanic.

This Hellenic orogeny to this point was part of the Alpine orogeny. The newly formed Alps connected to the Dinaric Alps, which were continuous with a chain called the Outer Hellenides, the last to form. (Note: "Hellenides" is a geologic term, not a geographic one. It refers to all the mountains of Greece, for which there is no universal geographic name. The designations "inner" and "outer" descend from the obsolete Geosyncline Theory, when the inner was considered to be the center of the Greek geosyncline, while the outer was on the margin. In today's theories, there was no geosyncline (not to be confused with ordinary synclines, which abounded). Now the terms mean roughly the west (outer) and the east (inner) part of Greece. A recent development is the division into northern and southern Hellenides north and south of the Gulf of Corinth. The Hellenic Arc and Trench are in the OH and also the SH. Rather than try to name all the mountains, the geologists assign zones to the inner and outer.) Each former forearc was its own type of rock, or facies. Mainland Greece thus consists geologically of strips, or isopic zones ("same facies"), or "tectono-stratigraphic units" of distinct rock trending from NW to SE. (Note: The expression of these zones appears irregular in many places and is fragmented by the many geologic events; nevertheless, the patterns are discernable by geologists, who have published them in numerous representations, such as color maps or labeled drawings. All the fragments cannot be included except on a large geological map. The decision of which to show is arbitrary. Alternative names may be used.)

The regime through the Oligocene, evidenced in the zone structure of Greece, was compressional. (Note: The geologic concept of "regime"," or "tectonic regime," or "stress regime," refers to the type of stress prevalent in a plate or section of a plate, resulting in a specific kind of plate interaction associated with a specific kind of faulting: the compressional regime, resulting in reverse faults, the extensional (normal faults), and the strike-slip. In and around the Aegean Plate, multiple regimes add complexity to the morphology and kinematics.) The subduction was in the Trench and its forearc was the edge of the overriding plate (the classical model). Subsequently, a superimposed extensional regime moved the subduction and the Trench back, but not necessarily at the same rate, nor did they always necessarily coincide. The former reverse faults were converted to normal, and many new extensional lineaments (tectonic features), such as pull-apart basins, appeared.

==== The extensional regime ====
The start line of the extension was a transform fault that has been called the Eastern Mediterranean North Transform (EMNT). It trended from the SW corner of Anatolia in a NW direction through the future center of the forearc across Central Greece well north of the future Gulf of Corinth. At some point the new forces began to pull apart the former strike-slip fault north of Anatolia merging it with the subduction, and pulling out a separate forearc from the previously docked coastal ridge, consisting of strips of the Outer Hellenides in the Ionian and some other zones.

===== CW rotation of the subduction zone =====
Slab rollback moved the subduction zone away from, but not parallel to, the continental coastline. A bathymetric view of the current configuration suggests that an angle was generated on the west by rotating the subduction zone away from the original strike of the EMNT as a baseline in the CW direction about a vertex, or pole, on the coast of Apulia, Italy. A triangle was formed of the base line, the subduction line, and a chord across the arc of the subtended angle.

Currently the vertex opposite the base line does not extend as far as the chord. The east leg curves, shortening the west leg. The curvature demonstrates that the east leg is not as rigid as the west. Plate consumption varies slightly over the west leg but falls off sharply over the east. It is hypothesized that the consumption on the east is expressed by short segments cutting across the scarps, which nevertheless have slip vectors aligned with the western vectors over the entire arc in a wheel-spoke pattern; that is, the azimuths of the vectors decrease regularly from west to east. (Note: A motion vector is an arrow representing quantity and direction of motion. Slip vectors in a compressional regime signify the dip-slip of the slab. They are thus the direction of compression. Strictly speaking the dip-slip vector is 3-dimensional but this presentation following the sources uses the projection of the 3-D vector on the surface, while the angle of dip and depth of the locations are stated separately.)

Though often shown crossing the Adriatic on maps, the subduction does not actually do so. The stress of the rotation was too great for the rock. The subducting plate broke along the KTF and also along the Plato–Strabo trench area, forming a parallelogram that slipped outward between the two strike-slip cross-faults. More than one fault was required to release the stress to the east because the velocity of the rotating subduction increases outward along the radius of rotation.

=== Subduction zone structure ===
==== The western trough ====
The surface expression of the KFZ appears to come to an end on the west at 37°48′N 20°00′E. It is generally sgreed that the fault represents the offsetting of the Hellenic Arc from the Hellenides north of the Gulf of Corinth due to Aegean Plate extension. Prior to the offset, the subduction zone of the Adriatic, or Apulian, Plate under the edge of the Balkans was continuous with the Hellenic Trench. One might conclude that the Trench is the location of the subduction and the border of the Aegean Plate, as some have.

As it turns out, the Mediterranean Ridge (MR), also arcuate, curves a little more to the north to intersect the KFZ a little further out than the HT. There is evidence that the KFZ projects further into the Abyssal Plain of the Ionian Sea at an angle to the strike of the previously known KFZ. The Plain is the site of the Mesozoic basement that further east is subducted. It is believed the KFZ may extend into it to a depth of as much as 15 kilometres (49,000 ft). As the KFZ may terminate both the HT and the MR on the north, either may be the location of the subduction. The location of the border between Aegean Plate and Ionian Sea Plain is again deferred until more definitive evidence can be obtained.

The Hellenic Trench from the intersection with the KFZ to south of Crete consists of a line of deep-sea basins named after surface features and divided from each other by gravity rises. The three major parts of the western trench are as follows.

===== The Zakynthos-Strophades basins =====
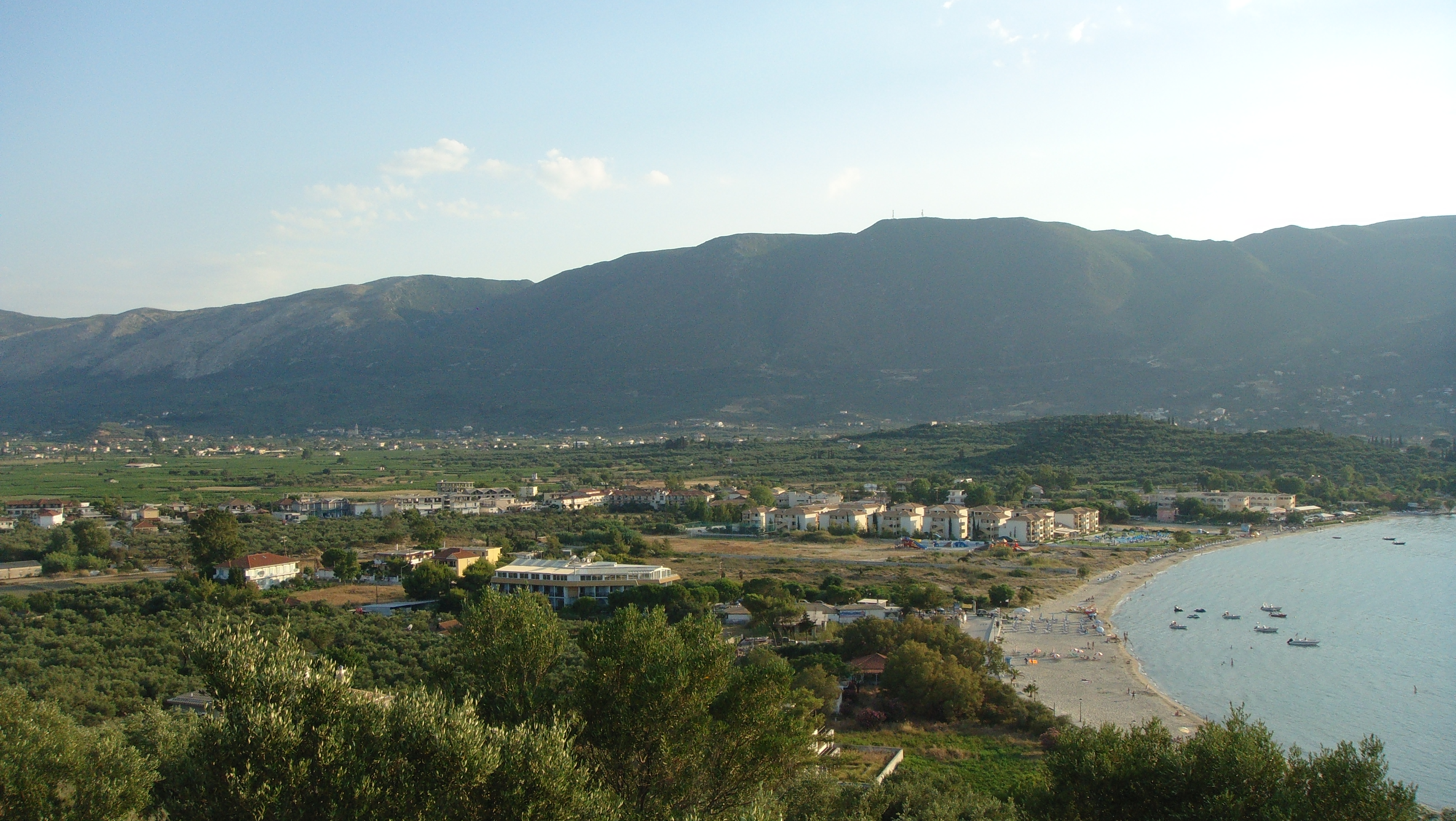
View of Zakynthos from Alykos, a port on the inner side. The highlands in the background are a remnant of the compressional regime from 30 MYA and before; i.e., part of the forearc. The lowlands in the foreground are an extensional feature; i.e., the back of the arc.

The KFZ is on the outer border of an archipelago termed (by some) the Southern Ionian Island Chain. The four main islands are Lefkada, Ithaki, Kefalonia, and Zakynthos. (Note: Geographically the full set of Ionian Islands include Corfu and Paxi to the north as well as Kythira to the south of the Peloponnesus, based on their proximity to the Ionian Sea.) The geographical custom in designating the waters between an island and the mainland is to call it a basin: the Zakynthos Basin (ZB), etc. The Southern Ionians also include the diminutive islands around the larger, including the two small islands to the south of Zakynthos, the Strofades. (Note: There are various ways to Anglicize the Greek by varying the f with ph or the d with dh.) They and Zakynthos are joined by the submarine Zakynthos–Strofades Ridge. The waters around Zakynthos are the ZB; around the Strofades, the SB. The two together are the Zakynthos-Strofades System.

===== Matapan deep =====
The Matapan Deep or Matapan–Vavilov Deep is roughly 5,120 meters (16,797 feet) deep. The Calypso Deep, located in the Matapan–Vavilov Deep, is roughly 5,267 metres (17,280 feet) deep and is the deepest point in the Mediterranean Sea.

===== Kithera–Antikithera deep =====
The Kithera–Antikithera deep is 4,615 metres (15,141 feet).

== Hellenic arc ecology ==
The trench and the arc to the north of it, including a strip of southern Anatolia, are home to some of the larger marine mammals, some of which are endangered species. Accordingly, the ACCOBAMS, an organization based on an international agreement to work for the conservation of these animals, has declared the trench and arc an IMMA, International Marine Mammal Area, and an MPA, Marine Protected Area. For example, the animals are at risk of, and suffer decimation and mutilation from, being run down inadvertently by ships. The ACCOBAMS keeps in contact with the navies of its members to try to avoid adverse encounters. Sometimes it conducts rescues of animals, and polices against hunting. The ACCOBAMS's Scientific Committee conducts investigations, manages data, and makes recommendations to member countries. Those currently include every state that borders on the Mediterranean.

The Hellenic trench region is an ecosystem to sperm whales and other aquatic life and has been used by marine biologists to study the behaviour of various aquatic species.

This is the trench where several earthquakes, including the 365 Crete earthquake, occurred.

== See also ==
- Extremes on Earth
- Santorini
- Mediterranean Ridge
- Aegean Sea plate
- Hellenic arc
- 365 earthquake

== Reference bibliography ==
- Blanpied, Christian; Stanley, Daniel Jean (1981). Uniform Mud (Unifite) Deposition in the Hellenic Trench, Eastern Mediterranean (PDF). Smithsonian Contributions to the Marine Sciences, number 13. City of Washington: Smithsonian Institution Press.
- Frantzis, Alexandros; et al. (2002). "Current knowledge of the cetacean fauna of the Greek Seas". Journal of Cetacean Research and Management. 5 (3). Map of Figure 1 downloadable separately.
- Ganas, Athanassios; Parsons, Tom (2009). "Three-dimensional model of Hellenic Arc deformation and origin of the Cretan uplift". Journal of Geophysical Research. 114 (B6): B06404. Bibcode:2009JGRB..114.6404G. doi:10.1029/2008JB005599.
- Hatzfeld, D.; et al. (1990). "The strain pattern in the western Hellenic arc deduced from a microearthquake survey" (PDF). Geophysical Journal International. 101 (1): 181–202. Bibcode:1990GeoJI.101..181H. doi:10.1111/j.1365-246X.1990.tb00767.x.
- Hieke, W.; et al. (2003). "The Ionian Abyssal Plain (central Mediterranean Sea): Morphology, subbottom structures and geodynamic history – an inventory". Marine Geophysical Researches. 24 (3–4): 279–310. Bibcode:2003MarGR..24..279H. doi:10.1007/s11001-004-2173-z. S2CID 128972462.
- Kokinou, E.; et al. (2006). "The Kefalonia Transform Zone (offshore Western Greece) with special emphasis to its prolongation towards the Ionian Abyssal Plain". Marine Geophysical Research. 27 (4): 241–252. Bibcode:2006MarGR..27..241K. doi:10.1007/s11001-006-9005-2. S2CID 128674293.
- Lallemant, S.; et al. (1994). "Spatial transition from compression to extension in the Western Mediterranean Ridge accretionary complex". Tectonophysics. 234 (1–2): 33–52. Bibcode:1994Tectp.234...33L. doi:10.1016/0040-1951(94)90203-8.
- Le Pichon, Xavier; Angelier, Jacques (1979). "The Hellenic Arc and Trench System: a key to the neotectonic evolution of the Eastern Mediterranean Area". Tectonophysics. 60 (1–2): 1–42. Bibcode:1979Tectp..60....1P. doi:10.1016/0040-1951(79)90131-8.
- Le Pichon, Xavier; et al. (2019). "A new approach to the opening of the Eastern Mediterranean Sea and the origin of the Hellenic Subduction Zone Part 2: The Hellenic subduction zone". Canadian Journal of Earth Sciences. 56 (11): 1144–1162. Bibcode:2019CaJES..56.1144L. doi:10.1139/cjes-2018-0315. hdl:1807/97249.
- Özbakır, Ali D.; et al. (2013). "The Pliny–Strabo trench region: A large shear zone resulting from slab tearing" (PDF). Earth and Planetary Science Letters (FTP). pp. 188–195. Bibcode:2013E&PSL.375..188O. doi:10.1016/j.epsl.2013.05.025. (To view documents see Help:FTP)
- Peterson, James A. (1993). Regional Geology and Hydrocarbon Resource Potential, the Mediterranean Sea Region (PDF) (Report) (Preliminary ed.). Missoula, Montana: U.S. Department of the Interior; U.S. Geological Survey.
- Royden, Leigh H.; Papanikolaou, Dimitrios J. (2011). "Slab segmentation and late Cenozoic disruption of the Hellenic arc". Geochemistry, Geophysics, Geosystems. 12 (3) 2010GC003280: n/a. Bibcode:2011GGG....12.3010R. doi:10.1029/2010GC003280.
- Shaw, Beth; Jackson, James (2010). "Earthquake mechanisms and active tectonics of the Hellenic subduction zone". Geophysical Journal International. 181 (2): 966–984. Bibcode:2010GeoJI.181..966S. doi:10.1111/j.1365-246X.2010.04551.x.
- Svigkas, Nikos; et al. (2019). "On the Segmentation of the Cephalonia–LefkadaTransform Fault Zone (Greece) from an InSARMulti-Mode Dataset of the Lefkada 2015 Sequence". Remote Sensing. 11 (16): 1848. Bibcode:2019RemS...11.1848S. doi:10.3390/rs11161848.
- Taymaz, T.; et al. (1990). "Earthquake mechanisms in the Hellenic Trench near Crete". Geophysical Journal International. 102 (3): 695–731. Bibcode:1990GeoJI.102..695T. doi:10.1111/j.1365-246X.1990.tb04590.x.
