= Cornelia gens =

Ancient Roman family

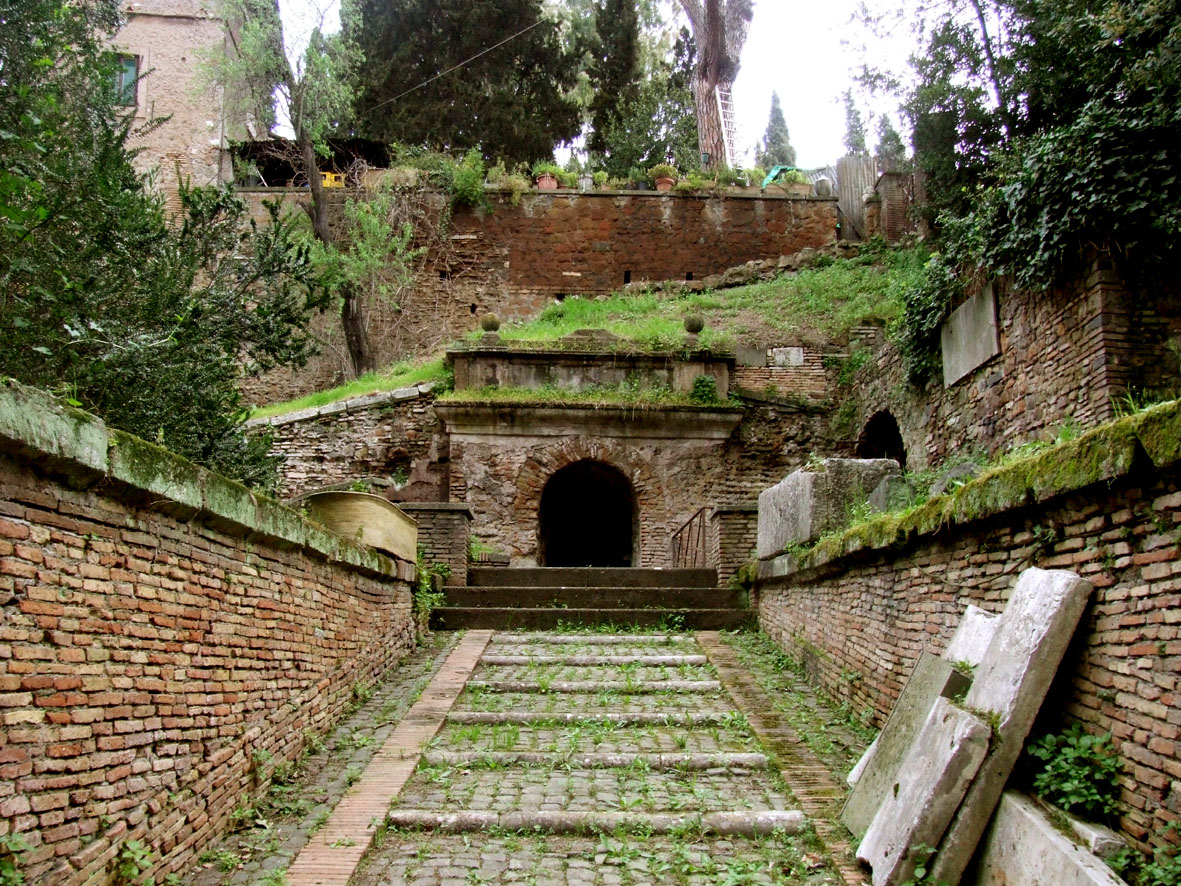
Entrance to the Tomb of the Scipios at Rome.

The gens Cornelia was one of the greatest patrician houses at ancient Rome. For more than seven hundred years, from the early decades of the Republic to the third century AD, the Cornelii produced more eminent statesmen and generals than any other gens. At least seventy-five consuls under the Republic were members of this family, beginning with Servius Cornelius Maluginensis in 485 BC. Together with the Aemilii, Claudii, Fabii, Manlii, and Valerii, the Cornelii were almost certainly numbered among the gentes maiores, the most important and powerful families of Rome, who for centuries dominated the Republican magistracies. All of the major branches of the Cornelian gens were patrician, but there were also plebeian Cornelii, at least some of whom were descended from freedmen.

== Origin ==
The origin of the Cornelii is lost to history, but the nomen Cornelius may be formed from the hypothetical cognomen Corneus, meaning "horny", that is, having thick or callused skin. The existence of such a cognomen in early times may be inferred from its diminutive, Corneolus. Such a derivation implies a Latin origin for the Cornelii, and there is no evidence to contradict this, but beyond this no traditions survive relating to the family's beginning.

== Praenomina ==
The Cornelii employed a wide variety of praenomina, although individual families tended to favor certain names and avoid others. Servius, Lucius, Publius, and Gnaeus were common to most branches, while other names were used by individual stirpes; Marcus primarily by the Cornelii Maluginenses and the Cethegi, Gaius by the Cethegi, and Aulus by the Cossi. Other names occur infrequently; Tiberius appears once amongst the Lentuli, who later revived the old surname Cossus as a praenomen, while the Cornelii Sullae made use of Faustus.

== Branches and cognomina ==
The Cornelian gens included both patricians and plebeians, but all of its major families were patrician. The surnames Arvina, Blasio, Cethegus, Cinna, Cossus, Dolabella, Lentulus, Maluginensis, Mammula, Merenda, Merula, Rufinus, Scapula, Scipio, Sisenna, and Sulla belonged to patrician Cornelii, while the plebeian cognomina included Balbus and Gallus. Other surnames are known from freedmen, including Chrysogonus, Culleolus, Phagita, and others. A number of plebeian Cornelii had no cognomen.

The first of the Cornelii to appear in history bore the surname Maluginensis. This family seems to have divided into two stirpes in the 430s, the senior line retaining Maluginensis, while the younger branches assumed Cossus. From their filiations, the first of the Cornelii Cossi would seem to have been younger sons of Marcus Cornelius Maluginensis, a member of the Second Decemvirate in 450 BC. Both families produced a number of consuls and consular tribunes during the fourth and fifth centuries BC. The Maluginenses disappeared before the period of the Samnite Wars, although the Cornelii Scipiones appear to have been descended from this family, while the surname Cossus appears as late as the beginning of the third century; members of the latter family also bore the cognomina Rutilus, "reddish", and Arvina. Cossus itself seems to belong to a class of surnames derived from objects or animals, referring to the larva of certain beetles that burrow under the bark of trees. The Cornelii Lentuli subsequently revived Cossus as a surname.

The Cornelii Scipiones derived their surname from a legend in which the first of the family served as a staff (scipio) for his blind father. Since the first of the Scipiones seems to have borne the cognomen Maluginensis, he would seem to have been the son of Publius Cornelius Maluginensis, one of the consular tribunes in 404 BC. The Scipiones produced numerous consuls and several prominent generals, of whom the most celebrated were Lucius Cornelius Scipio Barbatus and Publius Cornelius Scipio Africanus. Members of this family held the highest offices of the Roman state from the beginning of the fourth century BC down to the second century of the Empire, a span of nearly six hundred years. Its members bore a large number of additional surnames, including Barbatus, "bearded", Scapula, "shoulder blade", Asina, "she-ass", Calvus, "bald", Hispallus, "little Spaniard", Nasica, "nosed", and Corculum, "little heart", in addition to those derived from their military exploits: Africanus and Asiaticus. The last generations of this great family were originally adopted from the Salvidieni, and so bore the additional names of Salvidienus Orfitus. The Scipiones had a large family sepulchre at Rome, which still exists, having been rediscovered twice, most recently in 1780.

The cognomen Lentulus probably belongs to a class of surnames deriving from the habits or qualities of the persons to whom they were first applied; the adjective lentulus means "rather slow". An alternative explanation is that the name is a diminutive of lens, a lentil, and so belongs to the same class of surnames as Cicero, a chickpea, and Caepio, an onion. The Cornelii Lentuli were famed for their pride and haughtiness, so that Cicero uses Lentulitas, "Lentulusness", to describe the most aristocratic of the patricians. The Lentuli appear in history from the time of the Samnite Wars to the first century of the Empire, a period of about four hundred years. Their origin is uncertain. According to Livy, early in the Second Samnite War, Lucius Cornelius Lentulus described his father as the only man who, during the Gallic sack of Rome in 390 BC, had opposed paying a ransom to ensure the departure of the Gauls from the city. The filiations of other early Lentuli suggest that their ancestors used the name Gnaeus, suggesting that they could have been descendants of the Cornelii Cossi.

The Lentuli used a number of additional surnames, including Caudinus, apparently referring to the Battle of the Caudine Forks, crus, a leg, or the shin, Gaetulicus, bestowed upon the conqueror of the Gaetuli, Lupus, a wolf, Niger, black, Spinther, a bracelet, and Sura, the calf. The Lentuli also revived several old cognomina that had belonged to other stirpes of the Cornelii: Maluginensis, Cossus, Rufinus, and Scipio. At least two of this family bore surnames derived from other gentes; Clodianus was borne by a Lentulus who had been adopted from the Clodii, while Marcellinus belonged to a member of the family who was adopted from the Claudii Marcelli.

The Cornelii Rufini appear in the latter half of the fourth century BC, beginning with Publius Cornelius Rufinus, dictator in 334 BC. From the surname Rufinus, meaning "reddish", one may infer that the first of this family had red hair. A descendant of this family was the first to assume the cognomen Sulla, about the time of the Second Punic War. The name is probably a diminutive of Sura, a cognomen found in several gentes, including among the Cornelii Lentuli, and probably referred to someone with prominent calves. Plutarch, who erroneously believed that the dictator Sulla was the first to bear the name, thought it must have referred to a blotchy, reddish complexion, while Macrobius derives it from Sibylla, an etymology that is rejected by Quintilian. The dictator Sulla adopted the agnomen Felix, meaning "fortunate" or "happy", and this name was passed on to some of his descendants. The Sullae continued in the highest offices of the state well into imperial times. The last appearing in history fell victim to Elagabalus, early in the third century AD.

The Dolabellae first came to prominence at the beginning of the third century BC, and so remained until the reign of Vitellius. Several of the Dolabellae achieved high office, and one was Rex Sacrorum, but many of this family were notorious for their pride, extravagance, and disregard for the law. Their surname, Dolabella, is a diminutive of dolabra, a mattock or pickaxe, and belongs to a common class of surnames derived from everyday objects.

Several lesser patrician stirpes flourished during the late Republic and early years of the Empire. The Cornelii Merendae flourished for about a century, beginning in the early third century BC. Their cognomen means the midday meal, and is also found among the patrician Antonii. The Blasiones appeared at the same time and flourished for about 160 years; their surname was originally given to one who stammers. Cethegus is a cognomen whose original meaning and significance have been lost. The Cornelii Cethegi first appear in the latter half of the third century BC, and were described by Horace as cinctuti Cethegi, for their old-fashioned practice of wearing their arms bare. They remained prominent for the next two centuries. The Cornelii Mammulae held several praetorships, beginning at the time of the Second Punic War, but they never attained the consulship, and disappeared after about fifty years. Their surname is a diminutive of mamma, a breast. Merula refers to an ouzel, or blackbird. The family that bore this surname rose from obscurity at the beginning of the second century BC, and continued for the next century. The Cornelii Cinnae were the last patrician family to emerge in the late second century BC; they retained prominence until the early decades of the Empire.

Balbus, which like Blasio signifies a stammerer, was not originally a surname of the Cornelia gens, but was adopted by a native of Gades, who was granted Roman citizenship by Gnaeus Pompeius Magnus, as a reward for military service during the War against Sertorius. He probably took the nomen Cornelius after Gnaeus Cornelius Lentulus, who ratified the act making Balbus a citizen in 72 BC. He eventually attained the consulship, but the family, which was plebeian, disappeared from history in the early years of the Empire. Another plebeian surname of the Cornelii was Gallus, known from Gaius Cornelius Gallus, the poet, who came to Rome from Forum Julii as a young man. His surname signified his Gallic origin.

== Members ==
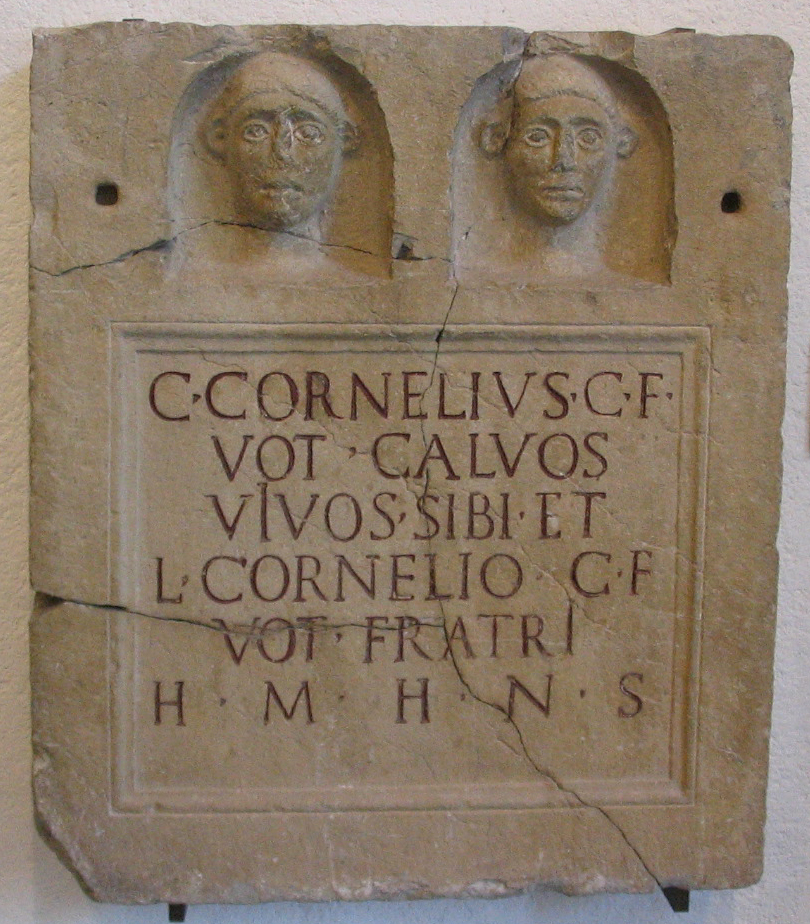
Monument of Gaius Cornelius Calvus, and his brother, Lucius.

This list includes abbreviated praenomina. For an explanation of this practice, see filiation.

=== Cornelii Maluginenses ===
- Publius Cornelius Maluginensis, the father of the consul of 485 BC
- Servius Cornelius P. f. Cossus Maluginensis, (Note: The Dictionary of Greek and Roman Biography and Mythology gives his name as Servius Cornelius Cossus Maluginensis, with the implication that the surnames of Cossus and Maluginensis properly belonged to all of the Cornelii before the 430s, when the two branches of the family diverged. However, the authority for this supposition is unclear, as Servius is not given a surname in either Livy or Dionysius, and nowhere are the two surnames united in the Fasti Capitolini.) consul in 485 BC, fought against the Veientes.
- Lucius Cornelius Ser. f. P. n. Maluginensis, consul in 459 BC.
- Marcus Cornelius L. f. Ser. n. Maluginensis, a member of the second decemvirate in 450 BC.
- Marcus Cornelius M. f. Maluginensis, consul in 436 BC.
- Publius Cornelius M. f. M. n. Maluginensis, consular tribune in 404 BC.
- Publius Cornelius P. f. M. n. Maluginensis, consular tribune in 397 and 390, and magister equitum in 396 BC.
- Marcus Cornelius P. f. M. n. Maluginensis, censor in 393 BC.
- Servius Cornelius P. f. M. n. Maluginensis, consular tribune in 386, 384, 382, 380, 376, 370, and 368 BC. He was also magister equitum in 361.
- Marcus Cornelius Maluginensis, consular tribune in 369 and 367 BC.

=== Cornelii Cossi ===
- Servius Cornelius M. f. L. n. Cossus, consular tribune in 434 BC.
- Aulus Cornelius M. f. L. n. Cossus, consul in 428 and consular tribune in 426 BC, slew Lars Tolumnius, King of Veii, to claim the spolia opima.
- Publius Cornelius A. f. P. n. Cossus, consular tribune in 415 BC.
- Gnaeus Cornelius A. f. M. n. Cossus, consular tribune in 415 and consul in 409 BC.
- Aulus Cornelius A. f. M. n. Cossus, consul in 413 BC.
- Publius Cornelius A. f. M. n. Cossus, consular tribune in 408 BC.
- Publius Cornelius M. f. L. n. Rutilus Cossus, dictator in 408 and consular tribune in 406 BC.
- Gnaeus Cornelius P. f. A. n. Cossus, consular tribune in 406, 404, and 401 BC.
- Publius Cornelius Maluginensis Cossus, consular tribune in 395, and consul in 393 BC.
- Aulus Cornelius Cossus, dictator in 385 BC.
- Aulus Cornelius Cossus, consular tribune in 369 and 367 BC.
- Aulus Cornelius P. f. A. n. Cossus Arvina, consul in 343 and 332, and dictator in 322 BC.
- Aulus Cornelius Arvina, fetialis around the late fourth century BC.
- Publius Cornelius A. f. P. n. Arvina, consul in 306 and 288, and censor in 294 BC.

=== Cornelii Scipiones ===
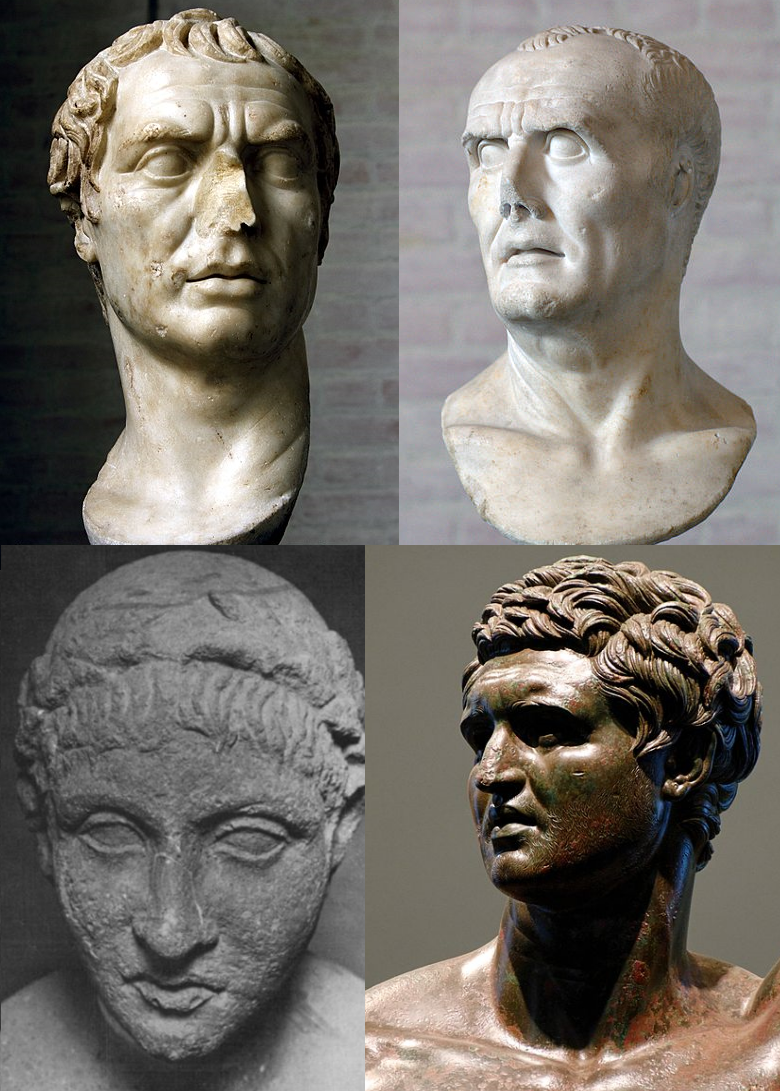
Four Cornelii Scipiones (clockwise from top left): Scipio Africanus, Scipio Asiaticus, Scipio Aemilianus, and Scipio Nasica Corculum.

- Publius Cornelius P. f. M. n. Maluginensis Scipio, magister equitum in 396 BC, and consular tribune in 395 and 394.
- Publius Cornelius P. f. Scipio, one of the two first curule aediles appointed in 366 BC, and magister equitum in 350.
- Lucius Cornelius P. f. Scipio, consul in 350 BC.
- Publius Cornelius (Scipio?) Scapula, consul in 328 BC, according to Livy; the Chronicon of 354 gives his surname as Barbatus.
- Publius Cornelius Scipio Barbatus, possibly consul in 328 BC, although Livy gives his surname as Scapula. Dictator in 306, either he or his brother, Gnaeus was pontifex maximus in 304.
- Gnaeus Cornelius Scipio (Barbatus), the father of Scipio Barbatus, the consul of 298 BC, may have been pontifex maximus in 304.
- Lucius Cornelius Cn. f. Scipio Barbatus, consul in 298 BC, and censor in 280.
- Gnaeus Cornelius L. f. Cn. n. Scipio Asina, consul in 260 and 254 BC, during the First Punic War.
- Lucius Cornelius L. f. Cn. n. Scipio, consul in 259 and censor in 258 BC, captured Sardinia and Corsica.
- Publius Cornelius Cn. f. L. n. Scipio Asina, consul in 221 BC.
- Gnaeus Cornelius L. f. L. n. Scipio Calvus, consul in 222 BC, slain in Hispania, 211.
- Publius Cornelius L. f. L. n., consul in 218 BC, slain in Hispania, 211.
- Lucius Cornelius L. f. L. n. Scipio, a younger brother of the Scipiones who were slain in Hispania, and uncle of Africanus.
- Publius Cornelius P. f. L. n. Scipio Africanus, the conqueror of Hannibal; consul in 205 and 194 BC, and censor in 199; Princeps Senatus.
- Publius Cornelius Cn. f. L. n. Scipio Nasica, consul in 191 BC.
- Lucius Cornelius P. f. L. n. Scipio Asiaticus, consul in 190 BC. Defeated Antiochus III the Great in 189.
- Publius Cornelius P. f. L. n. Scipio, elder son of Scipio Africanus, was elected augur in 180 BC. He was a noted historian and scholar.
- Lucius Cornelius P. f. L. n. Scipio, younger son of Scipio Africanus, praetor peregrinus in 174 BC, expelled from the Senate by the censors.
- Cornelia P. f. L. n., elder daughter of Scipio Africanus, wife of Publius Cornelius Scipio Nasica Corculum, and mother of Serapio.
- Cornelia P. f. L. n., younger daughter of Scipio Africanus, and mother of Tiberius and Gaius Gracchus.
- Gnaeus Cornelius Cn. f. L. n. Scipio Hispallus, praetor in 179 BC, and then became consul in 176.
- Marcus Cornelius Scipio Maluginensis, not related to the other Scipiones, he was perhaps a distant descendant of Publius Cornelius Maluginensis Scipio, of whom he reused the cognomen Maluginensis. He was praetor in 176 BC, but the censors of 174 expelled him from the Senate.
- Lucius Cornelius L. f. L. n. Scipio Asiaticus, quaestor in 167 BC.
- Publius Cornelius P. f. Cn. n. Scipio Nasica Corculum, consul in 162 and 155 BC, and censor in 159; pontifex maximus in 150 and princeps senatus in 147.
- Publius Cornelius P. f. P. n. Scipio, son of Publius Cornelius Scipio the historian, was appointed Flamen Dialis in 174 BC. His early death, about 169, compelled his father to adopt Scipio Aemilianus.
- Publius Cornelius P. f. P. n. Scipio Africanus Aemilianus, consul in 147 and 134 BC, and censor in 142, triumphed over Carthage and Numantia.
- Gnaeus Cornelius Cn. f. L. n. Scipio Hispanus, praetor in 139 BC.
- Publius Cornelius P. f. P. n. Scipio Nasica Serapio, son of Scipio Nasica Corculum, consul in 138 BC.
- Publius Cornelius P. f. P. n. Scipio Nasica, consul in 111 BC.
- Gnaeus Cornelius Scipio, praetor about 109 BC, refused the province of Spain.
- Lucius Cornelius L. f. L. n. Scipio Asiaticus, the father of Lucius Cornelius Scipio Asiaticus, consul in 83 BC.
- Publius Cornelius L. f. L. n. Scipio Asiaticus Comatus, uncle of Lucius Cornelius Scipio Asiaticus, the consul of 83 BC.
- Publius Cornelius P. f. P. n. Scipio Nasica, praetor in 93 BC, crushed a revolt in Spain.
- Lucius Cornelius L. f. L. n. Scipio Asiaticus, consul in 83 BC.
- Lucius Cornelius L. f. L. n. Scipio Asiaticus Aemilianus, the eldest son of Marcus Aemilius Lepidus, was adopted by Lucius Cornelius Scipio Asiaticus, the consul of 83 BC.
- Publius Cornelius P. f. P. n. Scipio Nasica, afterward Quintus Caecilius Metellus Pius Scipio Nasica, consul in 52 BC.
- Cornelia P. f. Metella, daughter of the consul Quintus Caecilius Metellus Pius Scipio; married first Publius Licinius Crassus and, after his death, Gnaeus Pompeius.
- Cornelia, daughter of Scribonia, and stepdaughter of Augustus; married Paullus Aemilius Lepidus, consul suffectus in 34 BC.
- Publius Cornelius Scipio Salvito, accompanied Caesar on his African campaign, in 46 BC.
- Publius Cornelius P. f. Scipio, consul in 16 BC.
- Servius Cornelius Ser. f. Scipio Salvidienus Orfitus, consul in AD 51.
- Publius Cornelius (P. n.) Scipio, consul in AD 56.
- Publius Cornelius Scipio Asiaticus, consul suffectus in AD 68.
- Servius Cornelius Ser. f. Ser. n. Scipio Salvidienus Orfitus, consul suffectus in an uncertain year during the reign of Domitian, he was later banished and subsequently put to death, supposedly for having plotted against the emperor.
- Cornelius Scipio Orfitus, consul suffectus in AD 101.
- Servius Cornelius Ser. f. Ser. n. Scipio Salvidienus Orfitus, consul in AD 110, during the reign of Trajan. He was praefectus urbi under Antoninus Pius.
- Servius Cornelius (Ser. f.) Ser. n. Scipio Salvidienus Orfitus, proconsul of Africa in AD 163 and 164.
- Servius Cornelius (Ser. f. Ser. n.) Scipio Salvidienus Orfitus, consul in AD 178.
- Servius Cornelius (Ser. f. Ser. n.) Scipio Salvidienus Orfitus, one of the Salii in AD 189 and 190.
- Lucius Cornelius Scipio Orfitus, vir clarissimus, augur in 295 AD, probably descended from the salius Palatinus.
- (Cornelius?) Scipio, a vir clarissimus in the late 4th century, possibly descended from Lucius Scipio Orfitus, the augur.

=== Cornelii Lentuli ===
- Lucius Cornelius Lentulus, according to his son, the only senator who voted against paying Brennus and the Gauls to leave Rome, in 390 BC.
- Lucius Cornelius L. f. Lentulus, consul in 327 and dictator in 320 BC.
- Servius Cornelius Cn. f. Cn. n. Lentulus, consul in 303 BC.
- Tiberius Cornelius Ser. f. Cn. n. Lentulus, son of the consul of 303 BC.
- Lucius Cornelius Ti. f. Ser. n. Lentulus Caudinus, consul in 275 BC.
- Lucius Cornelius L.f. Ti. n. Lentulus Caudinus, consul in 237 BC. (Note: Mommsen thought that Caudinus was princeps senatus as he spoke first during the debate on the declaration of war against Carthage in 219 BC, but Suolahti and Ryan reject it as several more senior censors were still living by this date.)
- Publius Cornelius L.f. Ti. n. Lentulus Caudinus, consul in 236 BC.
- Lucius Cornelius L. f. L. n. Lentulus Caudinus, curule aedile in 209 BC.
- Publius Cornelius P. f. L. n. Lentulus, praetor in 214 BC.
- Servius Cornelius Lentulus, curule aedile in 207 BC, and military tribune in Hispania in 205.
- Publius Cornelius L. f. L. n. Lentulus Caudinus, praetor in 203 BC.
- Gnaeus Cornelius L. f. L. n. Lentulus, consul in 201 BC, and subsequently one of the triumvirs appointed to bring new colonists to Narnia.
- Lucius Cornelius L. f. L. n. Lentulus, consul in 199 BC.
- Servius Cornelius Ser. f. Lentulus, ambassador sent to Greece in 171 BC, and praetor in Sicily in 169.
- Publius Cornelius Ser. f. Lentulus, brother of the praetor of 169, also an ambassador sent to Greece in 171 BC.
- Lucius Cornelius Lentulus, messenger of Lucius Aemilius Paullus, after the defeat of Perseus, in 168 BC.
- Publius Cornelius L. f. L. n. Lentulus, consul suffectus in 162 BC.
- Lucius Cornelius Cn. f. L. n. Lentulus Lupus, consul in 156 and censor in 147 BC.
- Gnaeus Cornelius Lentulus, consul in 146 BC.
- Lucius Cornelius Ser. f. Ser. n. Lentulus, praetor in 140 BC.
- Cornelius Lentulus, praetor in Sicily, defeated circa 134 BC during the First Servile War.
- Publius Cornelius P. f. L. n. Lentulus, praetor circa 128 BC, was the father of Publius Cornelius Lentulus Sura, consul in 71 BC.
- Lucius Cornelius Ser. f. Lentulus, quaestor circa 100 BC, was honored at Delos.
- Publius Cornelius (L. f.) Lentulus, legate of the consul Lucius Caesar in 90 BC, during the Marsic War. He was murdered by partisans of Marius in 87. He was probably father of Publius, quaestor c. 72 BC, and of Lentulus Crus.
- Gnaeus Cornelius Lentulus, consul in 97 BC.
- Gnaeus Cornelius Lentulus Clodianus, consul in 72, and censor in 70 BC.
- Publius Cornelius P. f. P. n. Lentulus Sura, consul in 71 BC, later one of Catiline's conspirators.
- Publius Cornelius P. f. L. n. Lentulus, quaestor circa 72 BC, possibly identical with Lentulus Spinther.
- Publius Cornelius P. f. (L. or Cn. n.) Lentulus Spinther, consul in 57 BC.
- Publius Cornelius P. f. P. n. Lentulus Spinther, a partisan of Pompeius, and later one of the conspirators against Caesar.
- Publius Cornelius Lentulus Marcellinus, the son of Marcus Claudius Marcellus, he was adopted by one of the Cornelii Lentuli. He was a lieutenant of Pompeius during the war against the pirates, in 67 BC, and was an orator of considerable merit.
- Gnaeus Cornelius Lentulus Cn. f. Clodianus, sent to observe the progress of the Helvetii in 60 BC.
- Gnaeus Cornelius P. f. Lentulus Marcellinus, consul in 56 BC.
- Gnaeus Cornelius Lentulus Vatia, mentioned by Cicero in 56 BC.
- Lucius Cornelius Lentulus Niger, Flamen Martialis, died in 56 BC.
- Lucius Cornelius L. f. Lentulus, Flamen Martialis following Lucius Cornelius Lentulus Niger, was still alive in 20 BC.
- Lucius Cornelius Lentulus Crus, consul in 49 BC, and a partisan of Pompeius.
- (Publius) Cornelius Cn. f. P. n. Lentulus Marcellinus, quaestor in 48 BC, commanded a portion of Caesar's fortifications at Dyrrhachium, where he was defeated by Pompeius with heavy losses, but afterward saved by Mark Antony.
- Lucius Cornelius Lentulus Cruscellio, proscribed by the triumvirs in 43 BC, but escaped, and was later reconciled with them. He was consul suffectus in 38 BC.
- Gnaeus Cornelius L. f. Lentulus, consul in 18 BC.
- Publius Cornelius Lentulus P. f. (Cn. n.) Marcellinus, consul in 18 BC.
- Gnaeus Cornelius Cn. f. Lentulus Augur, consul in 14 BC.
- Lucius Cornelius L. f. Lentulus, consul in 3 BC.
- Cornelia (L. f.), wife of Lucius Volusius Saturninus, consul suffectus in AD 3.
- Cossus Cornelius Cn. f. (Cn. n.) Lentulus Gaetulicus, consul in 1 BC.
- Publius Cornelius Lentulus Scipio, consul suffectus in AD 2.
- Servius Cornelius Lentulus Maluginensis, consul suffectus in AD 10. He had been appointed Flamen Dialis by Augustus, which prevented him from being appointed governor of Asia in AD 22.
- Servius Cornelius Ser. f. Lentulus Maluginensis, appointed Flamen Dialis in place of his father, following the latter's death in AD 23.
- Publius Cornelius P. f. Lentulus Scipio, legate of Quintus Junius Blaesus, proconsul of Africa in AD 22, was consul suffectus in AD 24.
- Cossus Cornelius Cossi f. Cn. n. Lentulus, consul in AD 25.
- Gnaeus Cornelius Cossi f. Cn. n. Lentulus Gaetulicus, consul in AD 26.
- Publius Cornelius Lentulus, consul suffectus in AD 27.
- Gnaeus Cornelius Cn. f. Cossi n. Lentulus Gaetulicus, consul suffectus in AD 55.
- Cossus Cornelius Cossi f. Cn. n. Lentulus, consul in AD 60.
- Cornelius Lentulus, a celebrated actor and writer of pantomimes; his period is uncertain, but he must have lived before the end of the first century.

=== Cornelii Rufini et Sullae ===
- Publius Cornelius Rufinus, dictator in 334 BC, but resigned due to a fault in his nomination. The Fasti Consulares list him again as dictator again in 333, during the first "Dictator Year" (a year without consul), but the historicity of the Dictator Years is doubted by modern scholars. Livy only mentions him in 334.
- Gnaeus Cornelius Rufinus, the son of Publius Cornelius Rufinus, the dictator of 334 BC, was father of Publius Cornelius Rufinus, dictator in 280.
- Publius Cornelius Cn. f. P. n. Rufinus, grandson of the dictator Publius Cornelius Rufinus, was consul in 290 and 277 BC, and dictator in 280.
- Publius Cornelius P. f. (Rufinus) Sulla, Flamen Dialis from circa 270 BC until the middle of the century, was the first of the Cornelii to bear the cognomen Sulla. He was probably the son of Publius Cornelius Rufinus, consul in 290 and 277, and father of Publius Cornelius Sulla, praetor in 212.
- Publius Cornelius P. f. P. n. Sulla, praetor urbanus and peregrinus in 212 BC, held the first Ludi Apollinares.
- Publius Cornelius P. f. Sulla, praetor in 186 BC, obtained Sicily as his province.
- Servius Cornelius P. f. Sulla, praetor in 175 BC, he obtained Sardinia as his province. He later served as a commissioner, sent to assist Lucius Aemilius Paullus in arranging the affairs of Macedonia, in 167 BC.
- Publius Cornelius Sulla, triumvir monetalis in 151 BC, possibly the uncle of the dictator Lucius Cornelius Sulla.
- Lucius Cornelius P. f. P. n. Sulla, son of the Publius Cornelius Sulla who was praetor in 186 BC, and father of the dictator Lucius Cornelius Sulla.
- Lucius Cornelius L. f. P. n. Sulla Felix, consul in 88 and 80, and dictator rei publicae constituendae causa from 82 to 81 BC.
- Servius Cornelius L. f. P. n. Sulla, brother of the dictator Lucius Cornelius Sulla.
- Cornelia L. f. L. n., daughter of the dictator by his first wife, Ilia; married first Quintus Pompeius Rufus, and after his death, Mamercus Aemilius Lepidus Livianus.
- Cornelius L. f. L. n. Sulla, son of the dictator by his fourth wife, Caecilia Metella, died in the lifetime of his father.
- Faustus Cornelius L. f. L. n. Sulla, son of the dictator, was quaestor in 54 BC, and later a partisan of Pompeius.
- Fausta Cornelia L. f. L. n., daughter of the dictator, and twin sister of Faustus Cornelius Sulla.
- Cornelia L. f. L. n. Postuma, daughter of the dictator by his fifth wife, Valeria.
- Publius Cornelius Ser. f. L. n. Sulla, a nephew of the dictator, was elected consul in 66 BC, but was disqualified from the office.
- Servius Cornelius Ser. f. L. n. Sulla, another nephew of the dictator, took part in both of the conspiracies of Catiline.
- Cornelia F. f. L. n., the daughter of Faustus Cornelius Sulla, and granddaughter of Lucius Cornelius Sulla the dictator.
- Publius Cornelius P. f. Ser. n. Sulla, son of Publius Cornelius Sulla, the consul of 66 BC, may have been the father of Lucius Cornelius Sulla, consul in 5 BC.
- Lucius Cornelius P. f. P. n. Sulla, consul in 5 BC.
- Lucius Cornelius Sulla P. f. F. n. Felix, a member of the Arval Brethren, was a grandson of Faustus Cornelius Sulla, the quaestor of 54 BC. He died in AD 21. He was the father of Faustus, consul in AD 31, and Lucius, consul in 33.
- Faustus Cornelius L. f. P. n. Sulla, son of the Arval Sulla Felix, was consul suffectus in AD 31.
- Lucius Cornelius L. f. P. n. Sulla Felix, another son of the Arval Sulla Felix, was consul in AD 33.
- Lucius Cornelius L. f. L. n. Sulla, son of Lucius Cornelius Sulla, the consul of AD 33, was consul suffectus in AD 52.
- Faustus Cornelius L. f. L. n. Sulla Felix, son of Lucius Cornelius Sulla, the consul of AD 52, was put to death by Nero in 63.
- Cornelius Sulla, governor of Cappadocia, put to death by Elagabalus.

=== Cornelii Dolabellae ===
- Publius Cornelius Dolabella Maximus, consul in 283 BC.
- Marcus Cornelius Dolabella, praetor in Sicily in 211 BC.
- Gnaeus Cornelius Dolabella, inaugurated as rex sacrorum in place of Marcus Marcius in 208 BC, and held this office until his death in 180.
- Lucius Cornelius Dolabella, duumvir navalis in 180 BC.
- Gnaeus Cornelius Cn. f. Cn. n. Dolabella, consul in 159 BC.
- Publius Cornelius L. f. Dolabella, father of the proconsul Lucius.
- Gnaeus Cornelius Cn. f. Cn. n. Dolabella, put to death in 100 BC, together with the tribune Saturninus.
- Lucius Cornelius P. f. L. n. Dolabella, as proconsul in 99 BC, defeated the Lusitani and received a triumph.
- Gnaeus Cornelius Cn. f. Cn. n. Dolabella, consul in 81 BC.
- Gnaeus Cornelius Dolabella, praetor urbanus in 81 BC, an accomplice of Verres.
- Publius Cornelius Dolabella, praetor urbanus in 67 BC, and later proconsul of Asia.
- Publius Cornelius Dolabella, consul suffectus in 44 BC, and Cicero's son-in-law.
- Publius Cornelius Dolabella, consul in 35 BC.
- Publius Cornelius P. f. P. n. Dolabella, consul in AD 10 and proconsul of Africa in AD 23 and 24, conqueror of Tacfarinas.
- Publius Cornelius P. f. P. n. Dolabella, consul in AD 55 and son of the consul in AD 10.
- Gnaeus Cornelius Dolabella, was put to death by Vitellius upon the emperor's accession in 69.
- Servius Cornelius Cn. f. Dolabella Petronianus, consul in AD 86.
- Cornelius Dolabella Veranianus, one of the sons of various Roman senators who were appointed to serve the Arval Brethren in AD 105.
- Servius Cornelius P. n. Dolabella Metilianus, either the father or the brother of the consul of AD 113.
- Servius Cornelius Ser. f. P. n. Dolabella Metilianus Pompeius Marcellus, consul suffectus in AD 113.

=== Cornelii Merendae ===
- Servius Cornelius P. f. Ser. n. Merenda, legate in 275 BC under the consul Lucius Cornelius Lentulus Caudinus, who rewarded him for taking a Samnite town. He was then consul in 274.
- Publius Cornelius Merenda, failed candidate to the consulship in 217 BC.
- Gnaeus Cornelius Merenda, praetor in Sardinia in 194 BC, and one of the ten ambassadors sent to Asia to negotiate and implement the Treaty of Apamea in 189 and 188.

=== Cornelii Blasiones ===
- Gnaeus Cornelius P. f. Cn. n. Blasio, consul in 270 and 257 BC, and censor in 265. He might have been Princeps Senatus in the 240s and early 230s.
- Gnaeus Cornelius Blasio, praetor in Sicily in 194 BC.
- Publius Cornelius Blasio, ambassador to the Carni, Istri, and Iapydes in 170 BC, and special commissioner in 168.
- Gnaeus Cornelius Cn. f. Blasio, triumvir monetalis circa 112 BC.

=== Cornelii Cethegi ===
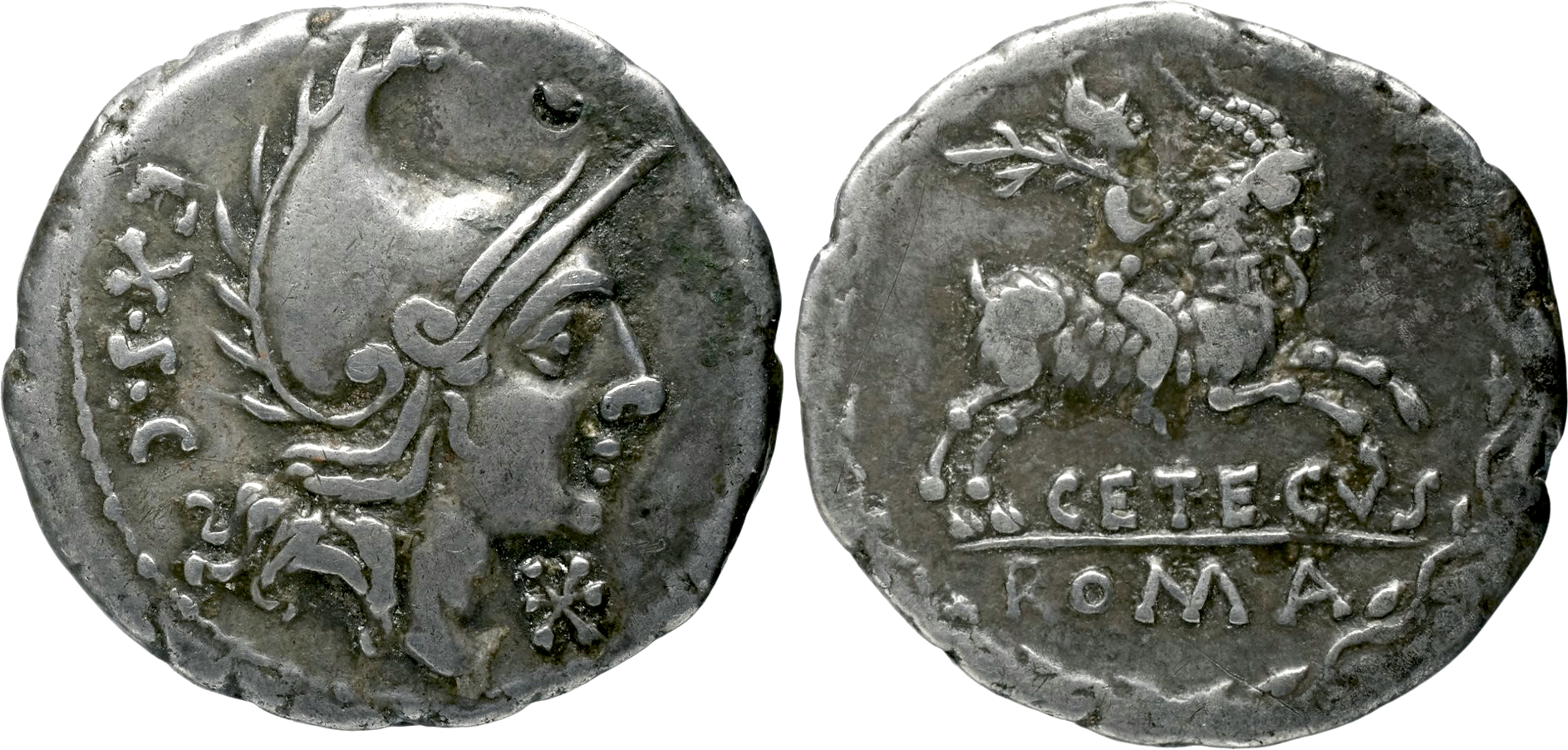
Denarius of Cornelius Cethegus, minted 115–114 BC. The obverse shows the head of Roma with a Phrygian helmet, while the reverse possible depicts young Dionysus riding a he-goat.

- Marcus Cornelius M. f. M. n. Cethegus, as flamen in 223 BC, was compelled to abdicate due to an error in performing a sacrifice. Appointed a pontifex in 213, when curule aedile; praetor in 200, censor in 209, consul in 204, and afterwards proconsul in Gaul, where he fought against Mago.
- Gaius Cornelius L. f. M. n. Cethegus, consul in 197 and censor in 194 BC.
- Publius Cornelius L. f. P. n. Cethegus, consul in 181 BC.
- Publius Cornelius Cethegus, praetor in 184 BC.
- Marcus Cornelius C. f. C. n. Cethegus, consul in 160 BC.
- Lucius Cornelius (C. f. L. n.) Cethegus, supporter of a bill by the tribune Lucius Scribonius Libo to impeach Servius Sulpicius Galba in 149 BC.
- Cornelius Cethegus, triumvir monetalis in 115 or 114 BC.
- Publius Cornelius Cethegus, a partisan of Gaius Marius, was pardoned by Sulla in 83 BC.
- Gaius Cornelius Cethegus, joined the conspiracy of Catiline in 63 BC, and was executed after its failure.
- Cornelius Cethegus, a senator who voted for the death of his brother, Gaius, for his role in Catiline's conspiracy.
- Servius Cornelius Cethegus, father of Servius, the consul of AD 24.
- Servius Cornelius Ser. f. Cethegus, consul in AD 24.
- Marcus Gavius Cornelius Cethegus, consul in AD 170.

=== Cornelii Mammulae ===
- Aulus Cornelius Mammula, praetor at the beginning of the Second Punic War in 217 BC. As propraetor in Sardinia the following year, he unsuccessfully petitioned the Senate for money and supplies for his soldiers.
- Aulus Cornelius Mammula, praetor in 191 BC, subsequently received the province of Bruttium.
- Publius Cornelius Mammula, praetor in 180 BC, received the province of Sicily.
- Marcus Cornelius Mammula, one of four ambassadors sent to Perseus of Macedon and Ptolemy VI of Egypt in 173 BC.

=== Cornelii Merulae ===
- Lucius Cornelius L. f. Merula, praetor urbanus in 198 BC, and consul in 193.
- Gnaeus Cornelius Merula, appointed legate by the Senate to resolve a dispute respecting the sovereignty of Cyprus in 162 BC.
- Lucius Cornelius Merula, curule aedile in 161 BC.
- Lucius Cornelius Merula, Flamen Dialis, and consul suffectus in 87 BC.

=== Cornelii Sisennae ===
- Publius Cornelius Sisenna, praetor urbanus in 183 BC.
- Gnaeus Cornelius Sisenna, praetor in Macedonia in 119 BC, then proconsul the following year.
- Gnaeus Cornelius L. f. Sisenna, triumvir monetalis between 118 and 107 BC.
- Lucius Cornelius Sisenna, praetor urbanus and peregrinus in 78 BC, then perhaps governor of Sicily; he was a supporter of Verres. Legate under Gnaeus Pompeius in 67, during the war against the pirates, he was sent to command the army based in Crete, but died soon after his arrival. Sisenna was a historian, whose work was greatly praised by Cicero and Sallust.
- Cornelius Sisenna, legate in Syria in 57 BC, serving under his father-in-law, Aulus Gabinius, the consul of the previous year. (Note: Sisenna is frequently misidentified as the son, rather than the son-in-law, of Gabinius.) when Gabinius was prosecuted for bribery by Gaius Memmius, Sisenna pleaded with Memmius on Gabinius' behalf, but to no avail.
- Cornelius Sisenna, triumvir monetalis in 5 BC.

=== Cornelii Cinnae ===
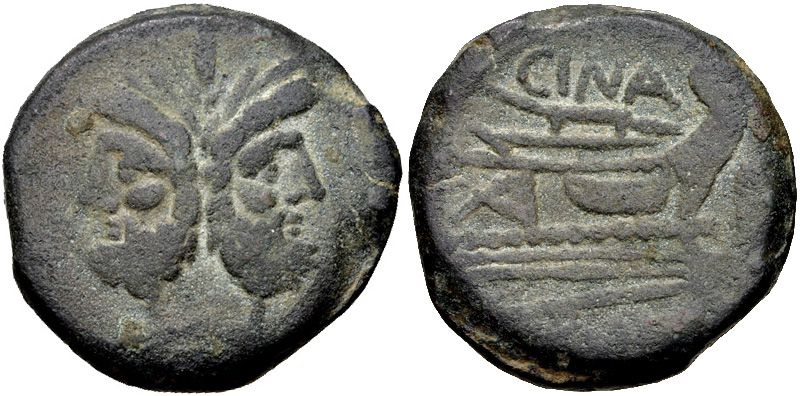
As of Lucius Cornelius Cinna (here spelt Cina), minted between 169 and 158 BC. The obverse depicts the head of Janus, while the reverse shows a prow.

- Lucius Cornelius L. f. Cinna, triumvir monetalis between 169 and 158 BC, legate in 136, praetor by 130, and consul in 127.
- Lucius Cornelius L. f. L. n. Cinna, consul in 87 (deposed), and from 86 to 84 BC. He was the leader of the Populares after the death of Gaius Marius, but was murdered by his own soldiers during his fourth consulship.
- Cornelia L. f. L. n., wife of Gnaeus Domitius Ahenobarbus.
- Cornelia L. f. L. n., daughter of the consul of 87 BC, and wife of Julius Caesar.
- Lucius Cornelius L. f. L. n. Cinna, praetor in 44, was almost murdered by a mob after denouncing his former brother-in-law, Julius Caesar, after the latter's assassination.
- Lucius Cornelius L. f. L. n. Cinna, quaestor of Publius Cornelius Dolabella against Brutus in 44 BC. He was probably suffect consul in 32 BC.
- Gnaeus Cornelius L. f. L. n. Cinna Magnus, consul in AD 5, conspired against Augustus but was pardoned.
- (Cornelia) Magna, sister of Cinna Magnus.

=== Cornelii Balbi ===
- Lucius Cornelius Balbus, consul suffectus in 40 BC.
- Publius Cornelius Balbus, brother of the consul of 40 BC.
- Lucius Cornelius P. f. Balbus, proconsul of Africa in 21 BC, triumphed over the Garamantes.

=== Other Cornelii during the Republic ===
- Aulus Cornelius, quaestor in 459 BC, attempted the prosecution of Marcus Volscius Fictor for his part in the exile of Caeso Quinctius.
- Publius Cornelius Calussa, elected pontifex maximus circa 330 BC, without having first held any of the curule magistracies.
- Publius Cornelius, praetor in 234 BC, received the province of Sardinia. While there, he and many of those under his command he became sick and died.
- Gnaeus Cornelius, installed as flamen Dialis in 174 BC.
- Gaius Cornelius M. f., a senator in 129 BC. He was possibly a son of Marcus Cornelius Cethegus, consul in 160, as the Cethegi were the only Cornelii to use the praenomen Gaius at this time.
- Lucius Cornelius M. f., a senator in 129 BC. Despite having the same filiation, the two senators of 129 were not directly related, as Lucius belonged to the tribus Romilia and Gaius was from Stellatina.
- Gnaeus Cornelius Cn. f., of the Palatina tribe, a councilor of the consul Pompeius Strabo in 89 BC, possibly a military tribune. He might be one of the Dolabellae, or the father of Lentulus Clodianus.
- Cornelius, a scriba during the dictatorship of Sulla, was quaestor during that of Caesar.
- Lucius Cornelius Chrysogonus, a freedman of Sulla who hunted the men proscribed by his master in 82 and 81 BC.
- Cornelius Phagita, another freedman of Sulla, captured Caesar when he was proscribed in 82 BC.
- Tlepolemus Cornelius, a painter from Cibyra in Sicily, who came into the service of Verres. Cicero called him one of Verres' canes venatici, his hunting dogs.
- Artemidorus Cornelius, another agent of Gaius Verres.
- Cornelius Nepos, a historian and contemporary of Cicero.
- Lucius Cornelius Alexander Polyhistor, a freedman of Greek origin, was a scholar, tutor, and writer on history and geography during the first half of the first century BC.
- Gaius Cornelius, a quaestor serving under Pompeius, was tribune of the plebs in 67 BC.
- Publius Cornelius, tribune of the plebs in 51 BC.
- Cornelius, a centurion in the army of Octavian in 43 BC, sent to Rome to demand the consulship for their general.
- Gaius Cornelius Gallus, poet, and prefect of Egypt in 30 BC.

=== Other Cornelii of imperial times ===
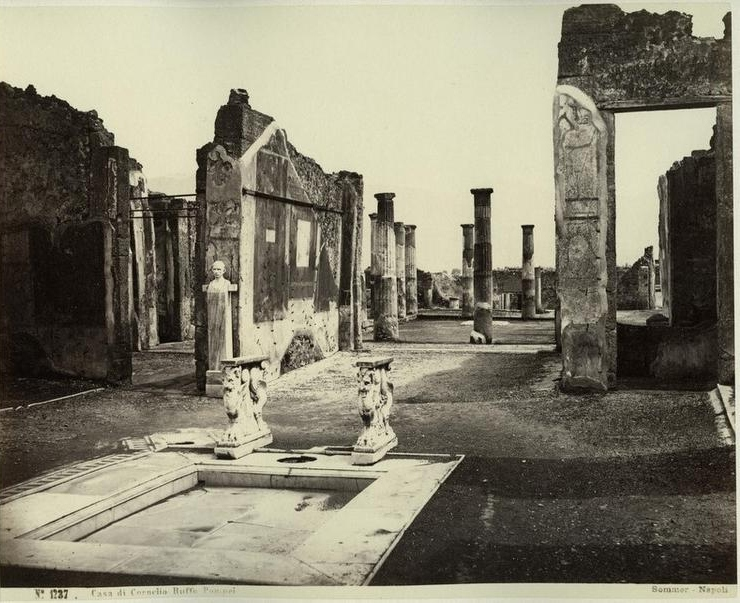
House of Cornelius Rufus, Pompeii

- Cornelia, a Vestal Virgin convicted of and executed for unchastity around the AD 90.
- Cornelius Severus, poet during the time of Augustus.
- Aulus Cornelius Celsus, a celebrated Latin writer on medicine, probably during the early part of the first century AD.
- Cornelius Tuscus, a historian spoken of by Seneca the Elder, who accused Mamercus Aemilius Scaurus of majestas in AD 34.
- Cornelius Fuscus, a Roman general and supporter of Vespasian.
- Cornelius Fuscus, probably son of the general, the addressee of the younger Pliny.
- Cornelius Martialis, served in the army of Titus Flavius Sabinus, and perished in the burning of the Capitol, in AD 69.
- Cornelius Laco, prefect of the Praetorian Guard under the emperor Galba, AD 69.
- Cornelius Rufus, a man whose house was found in Pompeii.
- Publius Cornelius Tacitus, one of the most celebrated Roman historians, who chronicled the first century of the Empire.
- Aulus Cornelius Palma Frontonianus, consul in AD 99 and 109, put to death by Hadrian in AD 117.
- Servius Cornelius, a jurist in the time of Hadrian.
- Lucius Cornelius Pusio Annius Messalla, consul suffectus in either AD 72 or 73.
- Lucius Cornelius Pusio Annius Messala, consul in AD 90 and son of the homonymous consul.
- Quintus Cornelius Senecio Annianus, consul suffectus in AD 142. His brother, Proculus, was consul four years later.
- Marcus Cornelius Fronto, a famous orator, and consul suffectus in AD 143.
- Quintus Cornelius Proculus, the brother of Annianus, was consul suffectus in AD 146.
- Quintus Cornelius Quadratus, consul in AD 147 and brother of the orator.
- Gnaeus Cornelius Severus, consul in AD 152.
- Sextus Cornelius Repentinus, praetorian prefect from AD 160 to 167.
- Cornelius Repentinus, praefectus urbi, son of the praetorian prefect, and son-in-law of the emperor Didius Julianus.
- Publius Cornelius P. f. Anullinus, a supporter and general of the emperor Septimius Severus. He was consul twice, the second time in AD 199.
- Publius Cornelius Anullinus, consul in AD 216.
- Julia Cornelia Paula, empress and first wife of the emperor Elagabalus, from AD 219 to 220.
- Titus Cornelius Celsus, one of the Thirty Tyrants (Roman) enumerated by Trebellius Pollio in the Historia Augusta.
- Publius Cornelius Saecularis, consul circa AD 240, and again in 260.
- Cornelia Salonina, empress and wife of the emperor Gallienus, from AD 253 to 268.
- Publius Licinius Cornelius Valerianus, otherwise known as "Valerian II", the son and heir of Gallienus.
- Publius Licinius Cornelius Saloninus Valerianus, another son of Gallienus, who elevated him to the rank of Augustus, making him the emperor Saloninus.

== See also ==
- List of Roman gentes

== Bibliography ==
=== Ancient sources ===
- Marcus Tullius Cicero, Brutus, De Officiis, De Oratore, Epistulae ad Atticum, Epistulae ad Familiares, Epistulae ad Quintum Fratrem, In Verrem, Philippicae, Pro Lege Manilia, Pro Sulla.
- Gaius Sallustius Crispus (Sallust), Bellum Catilinae (The Conspiracy of Catiline), Historiae (The Histories).
- Diodorus Siculus, Bibliotheca Historica (Library of History).
- Quintus Horatius Flaccus (Horace), Ars Poëtica (The Art of Poetry).
- Dionysius of Halicarnassus, Romaike Archaiologia (Roman Antiquities).
- Titus Livius (Livy), History of Rome.
- Valerius Maximus, Factorum ac Dictorum Memorabilium (Memorable Facts and Sayings).
- Lucius Annaeus Seneca (Seneca the Elder), Suasoriae (Rhetorical Exercises).
- Lucius Annaeus Seneca (Seneca the Younger), Ad Marciam, De Consolatione (To Marcia, on Consolation), De Clementia (On Clemency).
- Gaius Plinius Secundus (Pliny the Elder), Historia Naturalis (Natural History).
- Gaius Plinius Caecilius Secundus (Pliny the Younger), Epistulae (Letters).
- Sextus Julius Frontinus, De Aquaeductu (On Aqueducts).
- Marcus Fabius Quintilianus (Quintilian), Institutio Oratoria (Institutes of Oratory).
- Publius Cornelius Tacitus, Annales, Historiae.
- Plutarchus, Lives of the Noble Greeks and Romans.
- Gaius Suetonius Tranquillus, De Vita Caesarum (Lives of the Caesars, or The Twelve Caesars).
- Lucius Annaeus Florus, Epitome de T. Livio Bellorum Omnium Annorum DCC (Epitome of Livy: All the Wars of Seven Hundred Years).
- Appianus Alexandrinus (Appian), Bella Mithridatica (The Mithridatic Wars),
- Alexandrinus, Appianus. Bellum Civile [The Civil War].
- Lucius Ampelius, Liber Memorialis.
- Cassius Dio, Roman History.
- Aelius Lampridius, Aelius Spartianus, Flavius Vopiscus, Julius Capitolinus, Trebellius Pollio, and Vulcatius Gallicanus, Historia Augusta (Augustan History).
- Paulus Orosius, Historiarum Adversum Paganos (History Against the Pagans).
- Macrobius Ambrosius Theodosius, Saturnalia.
- Fasti Siculi.
- Quintus Aurelius Symmachus. Libri Decem Epistolarum.

=== Modern sources ===
- Johann Caspar von Orelli, Onomasticon Tullianum, Orell Füssli, Zürich (1826–1838).
- Gennaro Riccio, Le Monete delle Antiche Famiglie di Roma, Fino allo Imperadore Augusto Inclusivamente Co’Suoi Zecchieri dette Comunemente Consolari (The Coins of the Ancient Families of Rome, up to the Emperor Augustus, Including Mintmasters Representing the Consuls), Naples (1836).
- Dictionary of Greek and Roman Biography and Mythology, William Smith, ed., Little, Brown and Company, Boston (1849).
- Theodor Mommsen et alii, Corpus Inscriptionum Latinarum (The Body of Latin Inscriptions, abbreviated CIL), Berlin-Brandenburgische Akademie der Wissenschaften (1853–present).
- Wilhelm Dittenberger, Sylloge Inscriptionum Graecarum (Collection of Greek Inscriptions, abbreviated SIG), Leipzig (1883).
- George Davis Chase, "The Origin of Roman Praenomina", in Harvard Studies in Classical Philology, vol. VIII (1897).
- Paul von Rohden, Elimar Klebs, & Hermann Dessau, Prosopographia Imperii Romani (The Prosopography of the Roman Empire, abbreviated PIR), Berlin (1898).
- Friedrich Münzer, Römische Adelsparteien und Adelsfamilien (Roman Aristocratic Parties and Families), Stuttgart, 1920.
- Harold Mattingly, Edward A. Sydenham, C. H. V. Sutherland, The Roman Imperial Coinage, vol. I, from 31 BC to AD 69, London, Spink & Son, 1923–1984.
- T. Robert S. Broughton, The Magistrates of the Roman Republic, American Philological Association (1952–1986).
- Victor Ehrenberg and A. H. M. Jones, Documents Illustrating the Reigns of Augustus & Tiberius, Clarendon Press, Oxford (2nd ed. 1955).
- Jaakko Suolahti, The Roman Censors, a study on social structure, Helsinki, Suomalainen Tiedeakatemia (1963).
- Robert K. Sherk, "The Text of the Senatus Consultum De Agro Pergameno", in Greek, Roman, and Byzantine Studies, vol. 7, pp. 361–369 (1966).
- Sumner, G.V. (1973). The Orators in Cicero's Brutus: Prosopography and Chronology. University of Toronto Press. ISBN 0-8020-5281-9.
- Michael Crawford, Roman Republican Coinage, Cambridge University Press (1974, 2001).
- Géza Alföldy, Konsulat und Senatorenstand unter der Antoninen, Rudolf Habelt Verlag, Bonn (1977).
- Paul A. Gallivan, "The Fasti for A.D. 70–96", in Classical Quarterly, vol. 31, pp. 186–220 (1981).
- Filippo Coarelli, "La doppia tradizione sulla morte di Romolo e gli auguracula dell'Arx e del Quirinale", Gli Etruschi e Roma: atti dell'incontro di studio in onore di Massimo Pallottino, Rome, 1981, pp. 173–188.
- Giuseppe Camodeca: "I consoli des 55–56 e un nuovo collega di seneca nel consolato: P. Cornelius Dolabella" (The Consuls of 55–56 and a New Colleague of Seneca in the Consulate: P. Cornelius Dolabella), in Zeitschrift für Papyrologie und Epigraphik, vol. 63, pp. 201–215 (1986).
- Paul M. M. Leunissen, Konsuln und Konsulare in der Zeit von Commodus bis Severus Alexander, Verlag Gieben, Amsterdam (1989).
- Ronald Syme, The Augustan Aristocracy (revised ed.), Oxford: Clarendon Press (1989) [1986], ISBN 0-19-814731-7.
- Roger S. Bagnall, Alan Cameron, Seth R. Schwartz, and Klaas A. Worp, Consuls of the Later Roman Empire, American Philological Association (Philological Monographs No. 36, 1987).
- Mika Kajava, Roman Female Praenomina: Studies in the Nomenclature of Roman Women, Acta Instituti Romani Finlandiae (1994).
- John C. Traupman, The New College Latin & English Dictionary, Bantam Books, New York (1995).
- Filippo Coarelli, Revixit ars. Arte ideologia a Roma. Dai modelli ellenistici alla tradizione repubblicana, Quasar, 1996.
- Francis X. Ryan, Rank and Participation in the Republican Senate, Stuttgart, Franz Steiner Verlag (1998).
- Patrick Tansey, "The Perils of Prosopography: The Case of the Cornelii Dolabellae", in Zeitschrift für Papyrologie und Epigraphik, vol. 130 (2000).
- Filippo Coarelli, "I ritratti di ‘Mario’ e ‘Silla’ a Monaco e il sepolcro degli Scipioni", Eutopia nuova serie, II/ 1, 2002, pp. 47–75.
- Jörg Rüpke, Anne Glock, David Richardson (translator), Fasti Sacerdotum: A Prosopography of Pagan, Jewish, and Christian Religious Officials in the City of Rome, 300 BC to AD 499, Oxford University Press, 2008.
- Henri Etcheto, Les Scipions. Famille et pouvoir à Rome à l’époque républicaine, Bordeaux, Ausonius Éditions, 2012.
- Jones, A.H.M.; J.R. Martindale & J. Morris (1971–1992). Prosopography of the Later Roman Empire. Cambridge University Press. ISBN 0-521-07233-6.
- August Pauly; Georg Wissowa; Wilhelm Kroll; Kurt Witte; Karl Mittelhaus; Konrat Ziegler, eds. (1894–1980). Paulys Realencyclopädie der classischen Altertumswissenschaft. Stuttgart: J. B. Metzler.
- Broughton, T. Robert S. (1952–1986). The Magistrates of the Roman Republic. American Philological Association.
