= Family tree of the Cornelii Scipiones =

Ancient Roman family tree

This is the family tree of the Cornelii Scipiones — a prominent family of the Roman Republic — who were allied with the Sempronii Gracchi, Aemilii Paulli, and Caecilii Metelli, whose members are also shown. Only magistracies attested with certainty in Broughton's Magistrates of the Roman Republic have been mentioned. The dotted lines show adoptions from natural fathers. The name "Cornelius" is implied for all the men named Scipio except Quintus Caecilius Metellus Pius Scipio Nasica.

Legend
Yellow	Censor	Green	Roman consul

P. Maluginensis Scipio cos. 395
Publius Cornelius Scipio (magister equitum 350 BC)	L. Cornelius Scipio
Cn. Scipio
L. Scipio Barbatus cos 298
L. Scipio cos. 259	M'. Pomponius Matho cos. 233	Cn. Scipio Asina cos. 260, 254
Cn. Scipio Calvus cos. 222	L. Aemilius Paullus cos. 219, 216	P. Scipio cos. 218	Pomponia	P. Scipio Asina cos. 221
Cn. Scipio Hispallus cos. 176	P. Scipio Nasica cos. 191	Cornelia	L. Aemilius Paullus Macedonicus cos. 182, 168 cens. 164	Aemilia Tertia	P. Scipio Africanus cos. 205, 194 cens. 199	L. Scipio Asiaticus cos. 190
Cn. Scipio Hispanus pr. 139	P. Scipio Nasica Corculum cos. 162, 155 cens. 159	Cornelia	L. Scipio Africanus pr. 174	P. Scipio Africanus aug. 180	Cornelia	Ti. Sempronius Gracchus cos. 177, 163	L. Scipio quaes. 167
Cn. Scipio pr. c.109	P. Scipio Nasica Serapio cos. 138	Q. Caecilius Metellus Macedonicus cos. 143; cens. 131	P. Scipio Aemilianus cos. 147, 134 cens. 142	Sempronia	Ti. Sempronius Gracchus tr. pl. 133	L. Cornelius Scipio	Scipio Asiagenus Comatus
P. Scipio Nasica cos. 111	Caecilia Metella	C. Sempronius Gracchus tr. pl. 123, 122	L. Scipio Asiaticus cos. 83
Q. Caecilius Metellus Pius cos. 80	P. Scipio Nasica pr. 93	L. Scipio	Cornelia
Q. Caecilius Metellus Pius Scipio Nasica cos. 52
P. Licinius Crassus leg. 54, 53	Cornelia Metella	Cn. Pompeius Magnus cos. 70, 55, 52

== Gallery ==
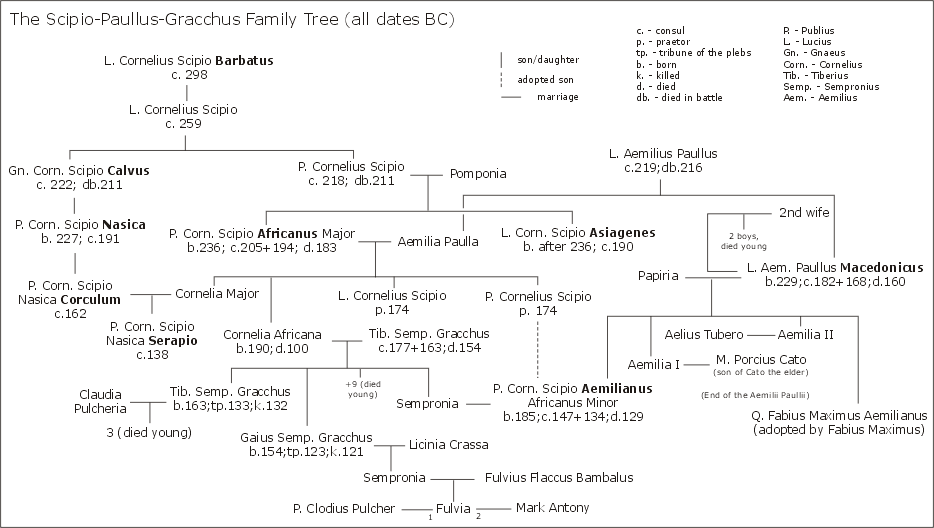
