= Publius Cornelius Scipio (flamen Dialis) =

Roman priest of Jupiter

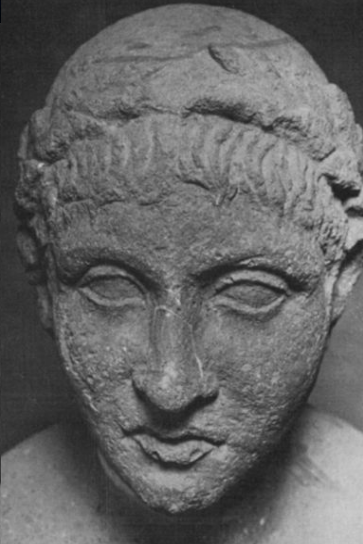
The so-called "Head of Ennius", found in the Tomb of the Scipiones, identified by Henri Etchteto as that of Scipio the flamen, now in the Museo Pio Clementino, Vatican.

Publius Cornelius Scipio (c. 195 – c. 170 BC) was a priest of the Roman Republic, who belonged to the prominent family of the Cornelii Scipiones. He was the grandson of Scipio Africanus and son of P. Cornelius Scipio. He is only known from an inscription found in the Tomb of the Scipios, which tells that he was flamen Dialis, the prestigious priest of Jupiter.

== Family background ==
In the second century BC, the patrician Cornelii Scipiones were the leading family of the Roman Republic, thanks to the large victories won by its members, such as that of Scipio Africanus against Hannibal, Scipio Asiaticus against Antiochus III, Scipio Hispallus against the Spaniards, or Scipio Nasica against the Boii. Scipio Africanus had two sons, Publius and Lucius, who however did not have the same prestigious career as their father; Lucius was embroiled in a corruption scandal, and Publius, the elder, had a weak health. The latter was nonetheless a noted historian and scholar.

Scipio the historian had only one son, the flamine, who however died before him. His early death left his father childless and prompted the adoption of a son of Aemilius Paullus, then known as Scipio Aemilianus. As Aemilianus had already been adopted by the Battle of Pydna in 168 BC, Scipio's death must have taken place just before. As his death is not recorded in Livy's History of Rome, Jörg Rüpke has suggested that it took place in 170, because there is a lacuna in Livy's manuscript at the place where he should have given the names of the new priests.

Scipio still had the time to marry, as it was a requirement to become flamine, but his wife is unknown.

== Flamen Dialis ==
Scipio is only known as having been Flamen Dialis, the great priest of Jupiter. As 6 of the 11 known flamines were Cornelii, several historians have noted that the gens had a special relationship with Jupiter. The Cornelii also frequently pictured Jupiter on the coins they minted until the end of the Republic.

Scipio was appointed flamen by the pontifex maximus Marcus Aemilius Lepidus, likely in 174 BC.

== Tomb ==
The first line mentioning the flamen was added later, perhaps by Scipio Aemilianus when he reorganised the familial tomb in the 130s BC. He might have wanted to enhance the prestige of his adoptive brother, who died before he could have a political career.

== Epitaph ==
Fragments of his sarcophagus were discovered in the Tomb of the Scipios and are now in a wall of the Vatican Museums. Only the broken frontal plate survives, preserving the epitaph, written in Old Latin Saturnian meter:

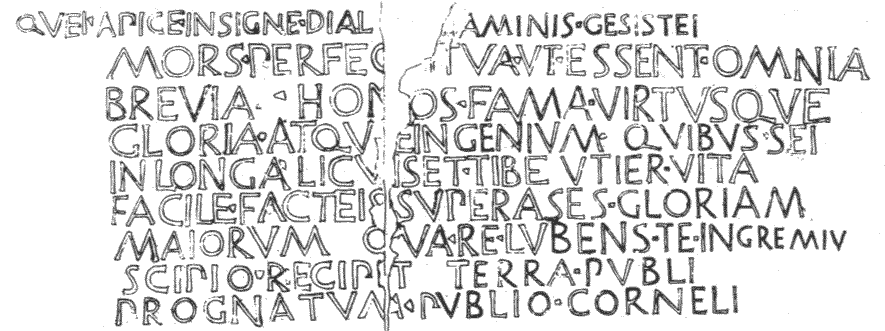
A reproduction of the inscription given in Sandys.

QVEI·APICEINSIGNE·DIAL[ ]AMINIS·GESISTEI
MORS·PERFE[ ]TVA·VT·ESSENT·OMNIA
BREVIA·HONOS·FAMA·VIRTVS·QVE
GLORIA·ATQVE·INGENIVM·QVIBVSSEI
IN·LONGA·LICV[ ]SET·TIBEVTIER·VITA
FACILE·FACTEI[ ]SVPERASES·GLORIAM
MAIORVM·QVA·RE·LVBENS·TE·INGREMIV
SCIPIO·RECIP[ ]T·TERRA·PVBLI
PROGNATVM·PVBLIO·CORNELI

The break obscures a few letters, marked by the brackets. The epitaph has been stated in modern upper- and lower-case script with the missing letters restored as:

quei apice insigne Dial[is fl]aminis gesistei |
Mors perfe[cit] tua ut essent omnia | breuia
honos fama uirtusque | gloria atque ingenium
quibus sei | in longa licu[i]set tibe utier uita |
facile facteis superases gloriam | maiorum.
qua re lubens te in gremiu | Scipio recip[i]t
terra Publi | prognatum Publio Corneli.

and also transcribed in classical Latin verse as:

...qui apicem insigne

Dialis flaminis gessisti, mors perfecit,
Tua ut essent omnia brevia, honos, fama,
Virtusque gloria atque ingenium quibus si
In longa licuisset tibi utier vita,
Facile superasses gloriam maiorum
Quare lubens te in gremium Scipio recepit
Terra Publi prognatum Publio Corneli

translated as:

For you who wore the distinctive cap of a Flamen Dialis, death cut everything short – honour, fame and virtue, glory and intellectual ability. If you had been granted a long life in which to use these advantages, you would have far surpassed the glory of your ancestors by your achievements. Therefore Earth gladly takes you in her arms, Scipio – Publius Cornelius, son of Publius.

This inscription is number three of the so-called elogia Scipionum, the several epitaphs surviving from the tomb.

Henri Etcheto suggests that the peculiar tone employed in the epitaph, with the use of the second person ("tua"), while the other elogia are written in the third person, reveals that it was composed by Scipio's father, as he was known for his literary qualities.

== Bibliography ==
=== Ancient sources ===
- Marcus Tullius Cicero, Brutus.
- Titus Livius, Ab Urbe Condita Libri.

=== Modern sources ===
- Tim Cornell (editor), The Fragments of the Roman Historians, Oxford University Press, 2013.
- Henri Etcheto, Les Scipions. Famille et pouvoir à Rome à l’époque républicaine, Bordeaux, Ausonius Éditions, 2012.
- Kirsteen Moir, "The Epitaph of Publius Scipio", in The Classical Quarterly, Volume 36, 1986, pp. 264–266..
- William Ramsay, A manual of Latin prosody (2 ed.), London and Glasgow, Richard Griffin and Company, 1859.
- Jörg Rüpke, Anne Glock, David Richardson (translator), Fasti Sacerdotum: A Prosopography of Pagan, Jewish, and Christian Religious Officials in the City of Rome, 300 BC to AD 499, Oxford University Press, 2008.
- John Edwin Sandys, Latin Epigraphy: an Introduction to the Study of Latin Inscriptions. CUP Archive.
