= Publius Cornelius Scipio =

Publius Cornelius Scipio may refer to:

- Publius Cornelius Maluginensis Scipio (consular tribune 395 BC)
- Publius Cornelius Scipio Africanus, also known as Scipio Africanus
- Publius Cornelius Scipio Africanus Aemilianus, also known as Scipio Aemilianus, or Scipio Africanus the Younger
- Publius Cornelius Scipio Asina (c. 260 BC–after 211 BC), consul in 221 BC
- Publius Cornelius Scipio Barbatus, a Roman statesman who served as the Consul in 328 BC and Dictator in 306 BC.
- Publius Cornelius Scipio (consul 218 BC) (d. 211 BC)
- Publius Cornelius Scipio (flamen Dialis)
- Publius Cornelius Scipio (son of Scipio Africanus), a historian
- Publius Cornelius Scipio Nasica (consul 111 BC)
- Publius Cornelius Scipio Nasica (consul 191 BC)
- Publius Cornelius Scipio Nasica Corculum
- Publius Cornelius Scipio Nasica Serapio
- Quintus Caecilius Metellus Pius Scipio, born Publius Cornelius Scipio Nasica, sometimes known as Metellus Scipio
- Publius Cornelius Scipio (consul 16 BC)

== See also ==
- Scipio Africanus (disambiguation)
