= List of Roman quaestors =

The following is a list of quaestors in ancient Rome, as reported by ancient sources and compiled by the scholar Thomas Robert Shannon Broughton.

The quaestorship was a political office in the Roman cursus honorum. The authenticity of the office prior during the early republic is doubted and quaestorships prior to 446 BC might be fabricated. There are large gaps in the lists of quaestors and only a small percentage of all who held the quaestorship is known. For those who are mentioned by ancient authors to have held the quaestorship during an unknown period, an estimate is provided in the list of the last possible date for such a questorship.

This list is currently incomplete and only contain those who held the quaestorship between 509 - 100 BC.

Unless otherwise noted all information is from Broughton's The Magistrates of the Roman Republic

Date	Name	Notes
509 BC	Marcus Minucius Augurinus Gaius Veturius Geminus Cicurinus	
<496 BC	Appius Claudius Sabinus Inregillensis	Quaestor prior to his consulship in 495 BC
485 BC	Caeso Fabius Vibulanus Lucius Valerius Potitus	
459 BC	Aulus Cornelius Quintus Servilius Priscus Structus	
458 BC	Titus Quinctius Capitolinus Barbatus Marcus Valerius Maximus Lactuca	
446 BC	Lucius Valerius Potitus Mamercus Aemilius Mamercinus	First elected Quaestors according to Tacitus
420 BC	-	Number of Quaestors increased to four
414 BC	Publius Sestius (or Sextius)	
409 BC	Publius Aelius Caeso Fabius Ambustus Publius Papius Quintus Silius	Plebeians are eligible to the Quaestorship
391 BC	Spurius Carvilius	
<316 BC	Appius Claudius Caecus	Latest date as argued by Broughton
294 BC	Lucius Opimius Pansa	
>267 BC	?	Number of Quaestors increased to 10
<237 BC	Quintus Fabius Maximus Verrucosus	Latest date as argued by Broughton
<236 BC	Quintus Fabius Maximus Verrucosus II	Latest date as argued by Broughton
c. 230 BC	Gnaeus Octavius Rufus	
<222 BC	Gaius Terentius Varro	Latest date as argued by Broughton
218 BC	Gaius Fulvius Flaccus Lucius Lucretius	
217 BC	Tiberius Sempronius Blaesus	
216 BC	Lucius Atilius Lucius Furius Bibaculus	
214 BC	Lucius Caecilius Metellus	
212 BC	Gnaeus Cornelius Lentulus	
209 BC	Gaius Flaminius	
<206 BC	Gnaeus Tremellius Flaccus Marcus Valerius Falto	Latest date as argued by Broughton. Mentioned as ex-Quaestors in 205 BC
204 BC	Marcus Porcius Cato	
202 BC	Gaius Laelius	
200 BC	Publius Cornelius Scipio Nasica	Quaestor sometime between 204 - 199 BC
<199 BC	Titus Quinctius Flaminius	Mentioned as ex-Quaestor in 198 BC
<196 BC	Lucius Cornelius Scipio Asiaticus	Latest date as argued by Broughton
196 BC	Lucius Aurelius Quintus Fabius Labeo	
<195 BC	Lucius Aemilius Paullus	Latest date as argued by Broughton
194 BC	Lucius Postumius Tympanus	
190 BC	Gaius Furius Aculeo	
<188 BC	Quintus Petilius Spurnius	Latest date as argued by Broughton
188 BC	Quintus Fabius Buteo or Quintus Fabius Maximus	
167 BC	Lucius Cornelius Scipio	
154 BC	Terentius Varro	
152 BC	Publius Licinius Crassus Dives Mucianus	
150 BC	Gnaeus Cornelius Scipio Hispanus	
148 BC	Lucius Fulcinnius	
146 BC	Gaius Publilius	
145 BC	Gaius Sempronius Tuditanus	
143 BC	Lucius Tremellius Scrofa	
142 BC	Lucius Tremellius Scrofa II	
137 BC	Tiberius Sempronius Gracchus	
134 BC	Quintus Fabius Maximus Allobrogicus	
132 BC	Quintus Fabius Maximus Eburnus	
126 BC	Gaius Sempronius Gracchus	
<120 BC	Gaius Marius	Latest date as argued by Broughton
120 BC	Publius Albius	
119 BC	Marcus Annius or Gnaeus Aufidius	Aufidius date given by John T. Graves in the Dictionary of Greek and Roman Biography and Mythology
117 BC	Marcus Aurelius Scaurus	Conjectured date by Broughton
113 BC	Marcus Antonius	
111 BC	Publius Sextius	
<109 BC	Lucius Licinius Crassus Quintus Mucius Scaevola Gaius Servilius Glaucia	Latest date as argued by Broughton
107 BC	Lucius Cornelius Sulla	
<105 BC	Gaius Claudius Pulcher Gnaeus Servilius Caepio	Latest date as argued by Broughton
105 BC	Gnaeus Octavius Ruso	
104 BC	Lucius Appuleius Saturnius Gnaeus Pompeius Strabo	
<102 BC	Marcus Livius Drusus Lucius Veturius Philo or Lucius Publilius Philo	Latest date as argued by Broughton
102 BC	Gaius Norbanus	
>101 BC	Gaius Fundanius	Alternatively dated in 89 BC
101 BC	Aulus Gabinius	
100 BC	Lucius Cornelius Lentulus Lucius Calpurnius Piso Caesoninus Quintus Servilius Caepio	
84 BC	Titus Aufidius	per Dictionary of Greek and Roman Biography and Mythology
81 BC	-	Number of Quaestors increased to 20
