= Tlepolemus (disambiguation) =

Tlepolemus is a Greek mythological figure, a son of Heracles who fought on the Greek side in the Trojan War.

Tlepolemus may also refer to:

- Tlepolemus (beetle), a genus of beetles
- Tlepolemus (general), one of the generals of Alexander the Great in 336-323 BC
- Tlepolemus (regent of Egypt), regent in Ptolemaic Egypt around 200 BC
- Tlepolemus Cornelius, Roman painter of the 1st century BCE, and agent of Gaius Verres
