= Publius Cornelius Sulla (disambiguation) =

Publius Cornelius Sulla may refers to:

- Publius Cornelius Sulla (died c. 45 BC, a politician of the late Roman Republic and the nephew of Lucius Cornelius Sulla
- Publius Cornelius Sulla (praetor 212 BC), great-grandfather of the dictator and reformer Lucius Cornelius Sulla Felix
- Publius Cornelius Sulla (praetor 186 BC), grandfather of the dictator and reformer Lucius Cornelius Sulla Felix
