= Bruttedius Niger =

Rhetornand Politician in the Roman Empire

Bruttedius Niger was a rhetor and politician of the early Roman Empire. He also wrote a historical work.

== Life ==
Bruttedius Niger was a pupil of the rhetor Apollodorus of Pergamon. During the reign of the emperor Tiberius he held in 22 AD the office of an aedile. In the same year he was one of the accusers of the consul of the year 10 AD, Caius Junius Silanus. He seems to have regarded the declaimer Junius Otho – who also was an accuser of Junius Silanus – as an example in the field of rhetoric.

The historian Tacitus recognizes the talent of Bruttedius Niger but thinks that he went astray because of his ambition. According to Juvenal, Bruttedius Niger first was a friend of Sejanus, but after the downfall and death of the powerful commander of the Praetorian Guard (31 AD) he kicked Sejanus's body.

Seneca the Elder has preserved two passages of Bruttedius Niger's historical work which deal with the assassination of Cicero (43 BC). About the death of this famous orator Seneca also provides excerpts of other contemporary historians, for example of Livy, Gaius Asinius Pollio, Aufidius Bassus, Aulus Cremutius Cordus and the poem by Cornelius Severus.
