= Publius Cornelius Scapula =

Roman consul in 328 BC

Publius Cornelius Scapula was a Roman senator and politician. He was a member of gens Cornelia. He may have been the same individual as Publius Cornelius Scipio Barbatus.

According to Titus Livius, he held the consulship in 328 BC, with Publius Plautius Proculus.
