= Elvers (disambiguation) =

Elvers most commonly refers to juvenile eels.

Elvers may also refer to:

== People ==
- Jenny Elvers (born 1972), German actress
- Karl-Ludwig Elvers (born 1962), German historian
- Rudolf Elvers (1924–2011), German musicologist

== Other uses ==
- Elvers Peak, mountain in Antarctica

== See also ==
- Elver (disambiguation)
