= Tlepolemus pilosus =

Scientific classification
- Kingdom: Animalia
- Phylum: Arthropoda
- Clade: Pancrustacea
- Class: Insecta
- Order: Coleoptera
- Suborder: Polyphaga
- Infraorder: Cucujiformia
- Family: Cerambycidae
- Genus: Tlepolemus
- Species: T. pilosus

Binomial name
- Tlepolemus pilosus (Thunberg, 1787)

Synonyms
- Cerambyx pilosus Thunberg, 1787 nec Poda, 1761; Tlepolemus namaqua Péringuey, 1908

Species of beetle

Tlepolemus pilosus is a species of beetle in the family Cerambycidae. It was described by Thunberg in 1787. It is known from South Africa.
