= Lucius Cornelius Scipio (praetor 174 BC) =

Lucius Cornelius Scipio (before 213 BC – after 174 BC) was a statesman of the Roman Republic. He was the second son of Scipio Africanus, but despite this illustrious background, his career was cut short by his demotion from the senate by the censors in 174 BC.

== Family background ==
Lucius belonged to the patrician gens Cornelia, one of the most prominent families of the Roman Republic. His father was Scipio Africanus, the famous general who defeated Hannibal during the Second Punic War, and his mother Aemilia Tertia. Lucius was born before 213, because he must have had at least 38 years old when he became praetor in 174, according the lex Villia, which set minimum ages for holding magistracies. Lucius had one elder brother, Publius Cornelius Scipio, born before 214, who did not embark on a political career, and two sisters: Cornelia, who married her cousin Publius Cornelius Scipio Nasica Corculum, and Cornelia, who married Tiberius Sempronius Gracchus.

Ancient sources diverge on Lucius' praenomen. In his Ab Urbe Condita, the historian Livy wrote Lucius, but Valerius Maximus used Gnaeus. Modern scholars usually favour Livy and call him Lucius.

== Career ==
Nothing is known on Lucius' early career, but he must have been military tribune and quaestor in the 180s. He followed his father and uncle Scipio Asiaticus during the Roman–Seleucid War (192–188), likely as praefect. In 190, he was captured by the Seleucid king Antiochos, who still released him without a ransom soon before the battle of Magnesia. Livy tells that two conflicting versions existed, one said that Lucius was captured by the Seleucid navy while sailing near Euboea, the other that it was by the Seleucid cavalry during a reconnaissance in Asia.

Lucius became praetor in 174. A former scribe of his father named Gaius Cicereius withdrew for the electoral race to help Lucius' election. Cicereius was elected the following year. For unknown reasons, Lucius' praetorship was unsuccessful. He was expelled from the senate by the censors the same year. Even his family rejected him and the signet ring of Scipio Africanus was taken back from him, perhaps by his own brother Publius.

His date of death is unknown, but he probably died between 174 BC and 170 BC. It is possible that his death, which left his brother with no male heirs, forced the brother Publius to adopt his own first cousin as his heir. This adoptive son would be Scipio Aemilianus. It is nevertheless possible that he had a son, of whom Cornelius Scipio Salvito would be a distant descendant.

== Bibliography ==
=== Ancient sources ===
- Titus Livius (Livy), Ab Urbe Condita Libri.
- Valerius Maximus, Factorum ac Dictorum Memorabilium (Memorable Deeds and Sayings).

=== Modern sources ===
- Henri Etcheto, Les Scipions. Famille et pouvoir à Rome à l’époque républicaine, Bordeaux, Ausonius Éditions, 2012.
