= Gnaeus Flavius =

Roman aedile in 304 BC

Gnaeus Flavius (fl. 304 BC) was the son of a freedman (libertinus) and rose to the office of aedile in the Roman Republic.

Flavius was secretary (scriba) to the consul Appius Claudius, a civil service job paid from the public treasury. The position allowed him to gain a thorough knowledge of Roman law, which had traditionally been a prerogative of the elite. He became the first person to publish an account of legal procedures ("actions in law" or legis actiones). These actions came as part of the wider struggle between the Plebeians and Patricians in the Republic of Rome; when the Plebeians, in 451 BC, succeeded in requesting a codification of the law of Rome (which then became the Law of the 12 Tables, or the lex duodecim tabularum), so that they had access to legal certainty, the patrician judges still kept the interpretation of these laws secret from the plebeians.

As a result of his high profile, he was elected aedile for 304 BC, one of two magistrates responsible for the maintenance of public buildings, purchase of grain, and regulation of festivals, despite the fact that at the time the sons of freedmen were also regarded merely as libertini. His election shocked the traditional governing elite into enacting voter registration "reforms" designed to curtail the growing voting power of freedmen in Rome. As aedile, Flavius also displayed in the Forum a calendar indicating the dies fasti, those days on which legal business was permitted. Pliny the Elder dates the transition of rings into common use at the time of Flavius, based upon his published legal proceedings.
