= Lucius Cornelius Scipio Asiaticus (quaestor 167 BC) =

Lucius Cornelius Scipio Asiaticus was a politician of the Roman Republic and served as quaestor in 167 BC

== Family ==
Lucius Cornelius Scipio Asiaticus was a member of the gens Cornelia and was the son of the famed Scipio Asiaticus that had defeated Antiochus III at the battle of Magnesia.

Lucius had two sons, Lucius Cornelius Scipio, and Publius Cornelius Scipio Asiaticus Comatus. Lucius Cornelius Scipio Asiaticus, consul 83 BC was his grandson.

== Career ==
Lucius served as military tribune in 168 BC. In 167 BC, he was elected to the position of quaestor. During his term of office he traveled to Capua to meet the king of Bithynia, Prusias II, and later accompanied him to Rome.

He died in 164 BC at the age of 33.
