= Tlepolemus puerulus =

Scientific classification
- Domain: Eukaryota
- Kingdom: Animalia
- Phylum: Arthropoda
- Class: Insecta
- Order: Coleoptera
- Suborder: Polyphaga
- Infraorder: Cucujiformia
- Family: Cerambycidae
- Genus: Tlepolemus
- Species: T. puerulus

Binomial name
- Tlepolemus puerulus Thomson, 1864

Species of beetle

Tlepolemus puerulus is a species of beetle in the family Cerambycidae. It was described by Thomson in 1864. It is known from South Africa.
