= Elver (disambiguation) =

An elver is a juvenile eel.

Elver may also refer to:

== People ==
- Elmore Elver, American politician
- Hilal Elver, American professor
- Helena Elver (born 1998), Danish handball player
- Élver James Melchor Bañol, Colombian rapist and serial killer

== See also ==
- Elvers (disambiguation)
