= Aemilia Tertia =

Wife of Scipio Africanus

Aemilia Tertia (d. 163 or 162 BC), properly Aemilia, was the wife of Scipio Africanus.

== Life ==
She was a member of the gens Aemilia, one of the ancient Roman patrician families, and the daughter of Lucius Aemilius Paullus who was consul in 219 and 216 BC. Paullus died in 216 at the Battle of Cannae and she married Africanus, then known only as Publius Cornelius Scipio, some time around the battle.

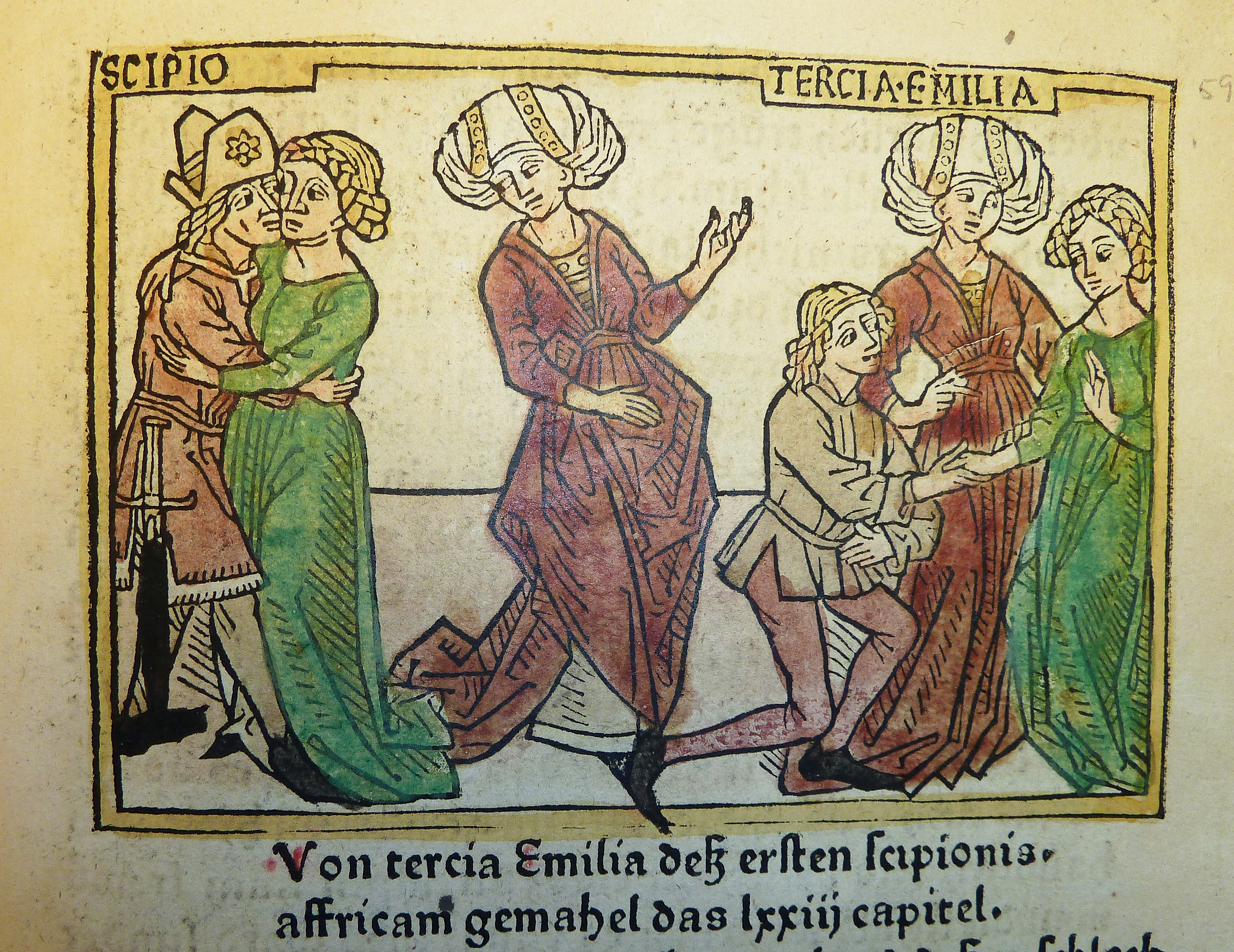
Aemilia Tertia in an anachronistic 15th-century woodcut illustration from a German edition of Boccaccio's book of illustrious women, De mulieribus claris

In life she was known for her ostentatious displays of wealth. Polybius, for example, noted in his narrative how Aemilia "display[ed] great magnificence whenever she left her house to take part in the ceremonies that women attend, having participated in the fortune of Scipio when he was at the height of his prosperity" before describing the large size of her retinue, gold and silver adorned carriage, and expensive sacrificial instruments. These ostentatious displays of wealth reflected high levels of status competition among the female members of the middle republican elite, especially in public religious rites – especially to Juno and Magna Mater – and in advertising politically for her family by organising prestigious marriages and public gatherings. She also assisted in suppressing news of Africanus' affair with one of their slave girls to protect his reputation; after Africanus' death, the girl was manumitted and married to one of their freedmen. She was provided some 300,000 denarii in Africanus' will as a usufructuary dower; she also arranged for Africanus' funeral mask to be installed at the Temple of Jupiter Optimus Maximus on the Capitoline Hill.

Aemilia died in 163 or 162 BC. The funeral was likely organised by Scipio Aemilianus, her main heir and adoptive son of her son Publius. Many of the precious instruments she had used for public religious rites were passed down in the Cornelian family, "memorial[ising] her and adorn[ing] her female relatives".

== Family ==
She is known to have had two brothers: Lucius Aemilius Paullus Macedonicus and Marcus Livius Aemilianus.

Aemilia bore four children with Africanus. There were two sons, Publius and Lucius: Publius was made augur in 180 BC; Lucius was praetor in 174 BC. They also had two daughters named Cornelia: the elder married Publius Cornelius Scipio Nasica Corculum and the younger married the consul of 177 BC, Tiberius Sempronius Gracchus.
