= Tlepolemus (beetle) =

Scientific classification
- Domain: Eukaryota
- Kingdom: Animalia
- Phylum: Arthropoda
- Class: Insecta
- Order: Coleoptera
- Suborder: Polyphaga
- Infraorder: Cucujiformia
- Family: Cerambycidae
- Subfamily: Lamiinae
- Tribe: Ceroplesini
- Subtribe: Crossotina
- Genus: Tlepolemus; Thomson, 1864

Synonyms
- Phymatoderus Dejean, 1835

Genus of beetles

Tlepolemus is a genus of longhorn beetles of the subfamily Lamiinae. There are at least three described species in Tlepolemus, found in South Africa.

== Species ==
These three species belong to the genus Tlepolemus:

- Tlepolemus grobbelaarae Bjørnstad, 2017
- Tlepolemus pilosus (Thunberg, 1787)
- Tlepolemus puerulus Thomson, 1864
