= Artemidorus Cornelius =

Ancient Greek physician in Rome in the 1st century BCE

Artemidorus Cornelius (Ancient Greek: Ἀρτεμίδωρος) was a Greek physician of ancient Rome who was born at Perga in Pamphylia, or, according to some editions of Cicero, at Pergamon in Mysia. He is known primarily as the agent and personal physician of the notorious Roman magistrate Gaius Verres.

One of the crimes alleged against Verres was his serial plundering of valuable artworks from religious sanctuaries, and Artemidorus assisted in Verres's robbery of the temple of Diana at Perga, when the latter was legatus to Gnaeus Cornelius Dolabella in Cilicia in 79 BCE. Afterwards Artemidorus attended Verres in Sicily during his praetorship in 72-69 BCE, where, among other acts, he was one of the judges (recuperatores) in the case of Nympho, a farmer whom Verres prosecuted for failure to pay a tax of wheat, a case considered by some to have been a miscarriage of justice and gross abuse of power.

His original name appears to have been "Artemidorus" (with no further epithet). Cicero seems to imply that he and other partisans of Verres (such as Tlepolemus Cornelius) did not previously have the name "Cornelius", but later suddenly assumed it together. It is believed he was at first a slave, and afterwards, on being freed by his master -- perhaps the same Gnaeus Cornelius Dolabella whom Verres had served -- took the name of "Cornelius", similar to how the 10,000 manumitted slaves of Sulla were also given their former master's name.

Most of what we know of him comes from Cicero's oration against what he saw as the abuses and misgovernment of Verres, In Verrem, though Cicero uses three different names: "Cornelius medicus", "Artemidorus Pergaeus", and "Artemidorus Cornelius". Most scholars agree these all refer to the same person, though very rarely they have been treated as separate, as in the Index Historicus of Johann August Ernesti.
