= Cornelia (Vestal) =

Roman Vestal Virgin executed c. 90 AD

Cornelia was an ancient Roman chief Vestal virgin (Vestalis Maxima) convicted of and executed for unchastity around the year 90 CE. The Roman historian Suetonius records that she had been previously tried for a crime but was then acquitted. However, following her second trial, she was convicted and sentenced to live burial and her lover was beaten to death with rods in the Comitium. The Emperor Domitian (r. 81–96) did permit one of her paramours, an ex-praetor, to survive, supposedly because he had confessed to the crime before the case had been concluded and because the torture of the witnesses had not yielded any results.

Pliny the Younger, a 1st-century Roman author, states that Domitian was furious at the lack of witnesses for this case, though he had already resolved to execute Cornelia so as to render his reign famous for having had such a significant trial occur during his tenure as emperor. According to Pliny, Domitian summoned the College of Pontiffs to discuss the case, though he set the meeting to take place within his Alban palace rather than in the Regia, their traditional gathering spot. She was allegedly condemned in absentia without any opportunity to present a defense. Pliny writes that, whilst being led to the spot of her execution, she supposedly chanted "how can the emperor imagine I could have broken my vows when it was I who performed the sacred rites to bring him victories and triumphs!" Pliny states that it is unknown whether she uttered these words out of contempt for Domitian or to try to incur his mercy. When she was descending into the underground chamber within which she was to be buried, her stola was caught and the executioner (carnifex), presumably Domitian, offered his hand to help her, but she recoiled from his touch in disgust.

Her supposed lover, a Roman equestrian named Celer, also protested his innocence, even as he was being publicly beaten to death in the Comitium with rods. In Pliny's account, Domitian then sought to prosecute an individual named Licinianus, whom he accused of having hidden one of Cornelia's freedwomen in his house. Licinianus was then supposedly advised by others to admit guilt so as to avoid public execution in the same manner as Celer. He heeded this advice, and his advocate, Herennius Senecio, informed Domitian of his confession. Afterwards, Domitian granted Licinianus the lighter sentence of exile, and he was permitted to keep any items he could manage to remove from his house before his property was confiscated. Pliny further writes that, eventually, under the reign of Emperor Nerva, Licinianus was permitted to travel to Sicily, where he found work as a teacher.

She has been identified with the "Cornelia of the family of the Cossi" (Cornelia ex familia Cossorum capta est) mentioned by the historian Tacitus as a replacement for the Vestal virgin Laelia in the year 62 CE. If the two are the same person, she would have been between 33 and 39 years old at the time of her execution, as Vestal Virgins were – according to the 2nd-century author Aulus Gellius – recruited when aged between six and ten. According to the classicist Jakub Pigoń, five of the six members of the college of Vestals early in Domitian's reign are known: Cornelia, Varronilla, Licinia Praetextata, and two sisters named Oculata. If Tacitus's Cornelia were the unknown sixth Vestal, two Cornelias would have served at the same time, which Pigoń considers possible but unlikely. It is also unlikely that Tacitus's Cornelia had died before Domitian's reign, as an inscription set up by her father, Cossus Cornelius Gaetulicus, indicates that she did not die very young. Pigoń therefore considers it most probable that the two Cornelias were the same person. He also argues that Tacitus was fond of recording the early careers of figures who later became significant, and that the mention of Cornelia's selection in 62 would have had no point unless she was the chief Vestal later executed under Domitian.
