= Tomb of the Scipios =

Common tomb of the Scipio family during the Roman Republic

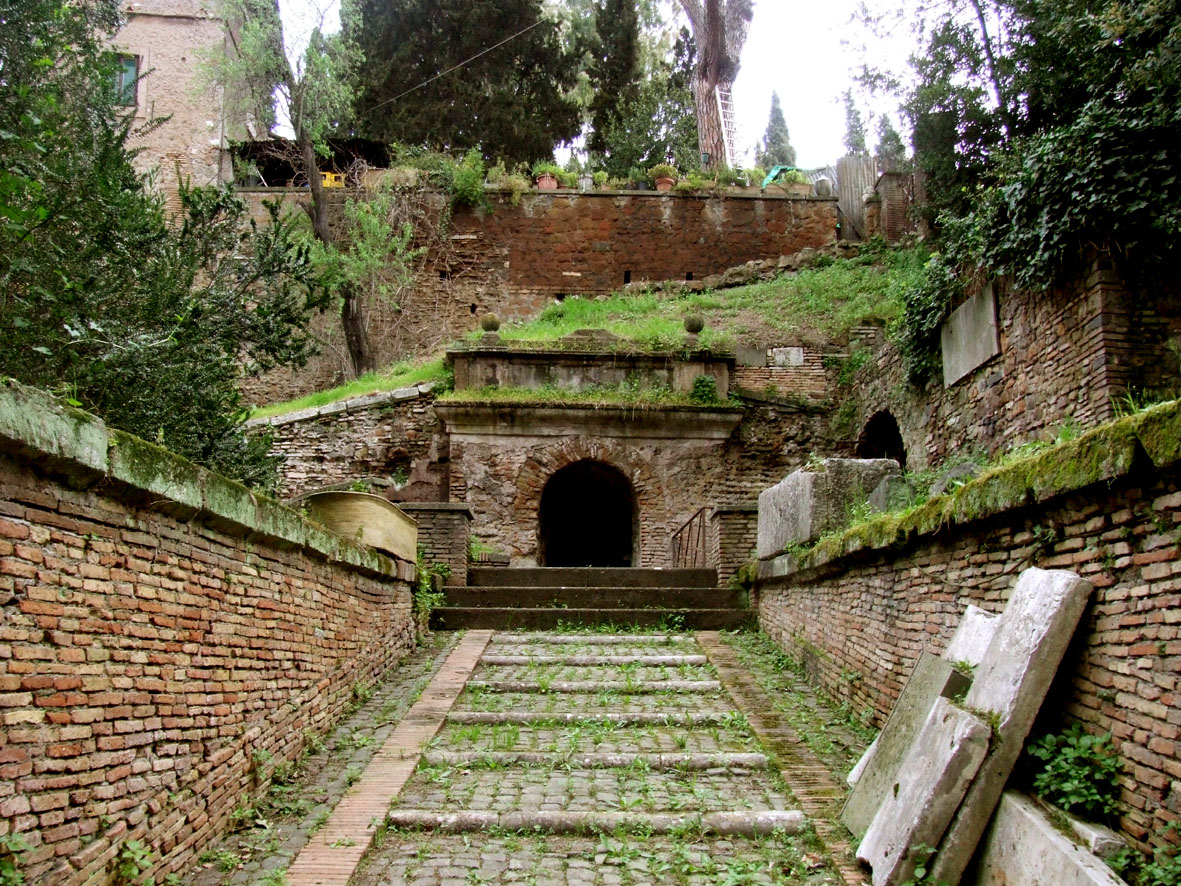
- Entrance to the tomb.

- Location in ancient Rome
- Interactive map of Tomb of the Scipios
- 41°52′34″N 12°30′03″E
- Type: Mausoleum
- Location: Regio IX Circus Flaminius

History
- Built: 28 BC
- Built by: Augustus

The Tomb of the Scipios (Latin: sepulcrum Scipionum), also called the hypogaeum Scipionum, was the common tomb of the patrician Scipio family during the Roman Republic for interments between the early 3rd century BC and the early 1st century AD. Then it was abandoned and within a few hundred years its location was lost.

The tomb was rediscovered twice, the last time in 1780 and stands under a hill by the side of the road behind a wall at numbers 9 and 12 Via di Porta San Sebastiano, Rome, where it can be visited by the public for a small admission fee. The location was privately owned on discovery of the tomb but was bought by the city in 1880 at the suggestion of Rodolfo Amedeo Lanciani. A house was subsequently built in a previous vineyard there. The current main entrance to the tomb is an arched opening in the side of the hill, not the original main entrance. After discovery the few surviving remains were moved and interred with honor elsewhere or unknowingly discarded. The moveables—the one whole sarcophagus and the fragments of other sarcophagi—were placed on display in the hall of the Pio-Clementino Museum at the Vatican in 1912. The sepulchre is a rock-cut chambered tomb on the interior, with the remains of a late façade on the exterior.

During the republic the tomb stood in a cemetery for notables and their families located in the angle between the Via Appia and the Via Latina on a connecting road joining the two just past the branch point. It was originally outside the city not far from where the Via Appia passed through the Servian Wall at the Porta Capena. In subsequent centuries new construction changed the landmarks of the vicinity entirely. The wall was expanded to become the Aurelian Wall through which the Porta Appia admitted the Via Appia. The cemetery was now inside the city. The Appian gate today is called the Porta San Sebastiano. Before it is the so-called Arch of Drusus, actually a section of aqueduct. The Via Appia at that location was renamed to the Via di Porta San Sebastiano. It passes through the Parco degli Scipioni where the cemetery once was located. The via is open to traffic. Most of it is lined by walls.

== History ==
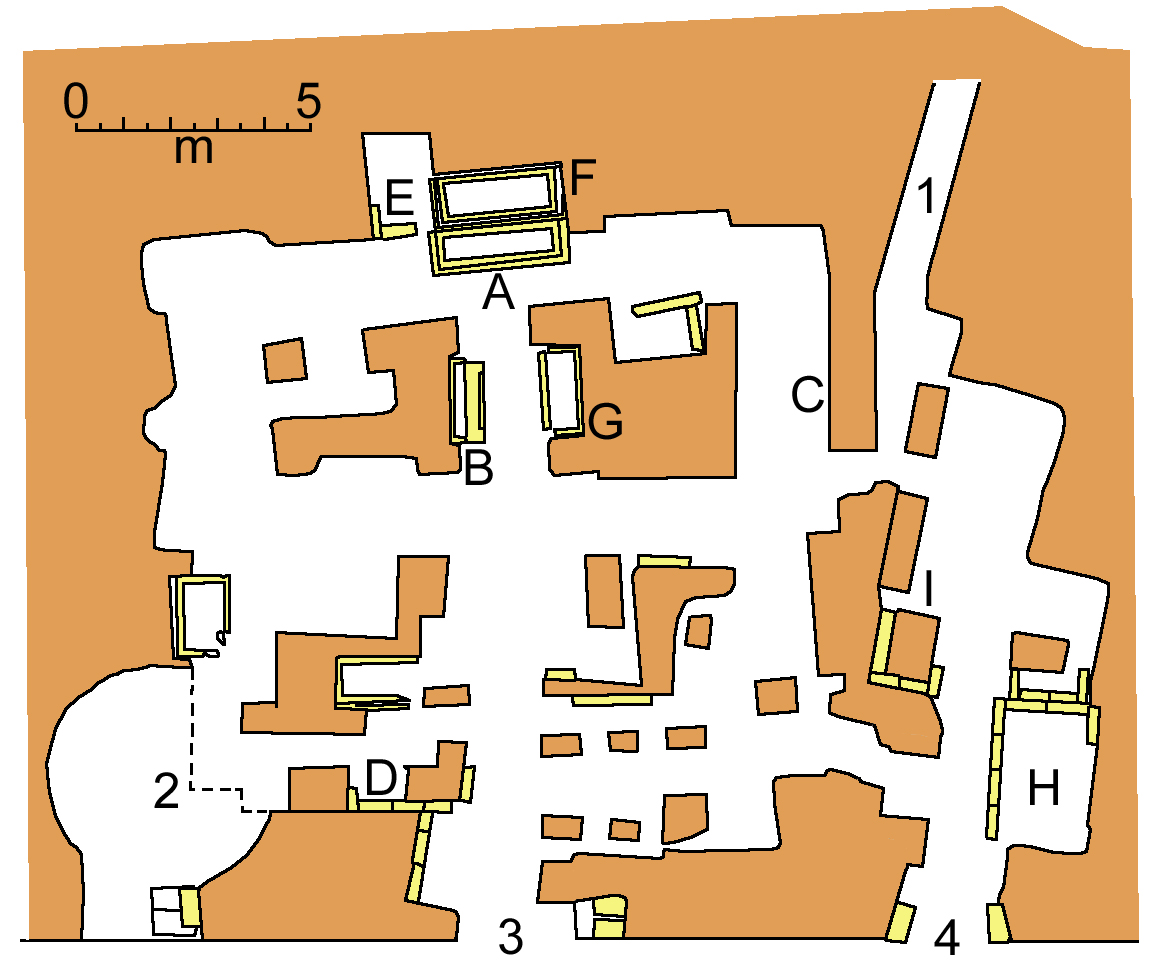
Floor plan of the tomb, based on a plan by Filippo Coarelli. 1 is the old entrance fronting on the park road, 2 is a "calcinara", an intrusive mediaeval lime kiln, 3 is the arched entrance seen in the photographs (street number 6), anciently overlooking the Via Appia, 4 is the entrance to the new room (street number 12). Letters from A to I were the sarcophagi or loculi with inscriptions. The tomb is now empty except for facsimiles; the remains were discarded or reinterred, while the sarcophagi fragments ultimately went to the Vatican.

=== Period of use by the family ===
The tomb was founded around the turn of the 3rd century BC, after the opening of the Via Appia in 312 BC, probably by the then head of the family, Lucius Cornelius Scipio Barbatus, consul in 298 BC. He was the earliest known occupant after his death around 280 BC. His sarcophagus was the only one to survive intact – it is now on show at the Vatican Museums, reunited with its original inscription. According to Coarelli, the capacity of 30 burial places was reached, and the main body of the complex was essentially complete, by the middle 2nd century BC, but new burials continued at long intervals until the 1st century AD. During that time the tomb was a landmark in ancient Rome.

The tomb held the remains of one person outside the Scipio family: the poet Ennius, of whom there was a marble statue in the tomb according to Cicero. None of the more familiar Scipios (Africanus, Asiaticus and Hispanicus) were buried here, but according to Livy and Seneca were buried in their villa at Liternum.

The inscriptions on the sarcophagi also suggest that the hypogeum was complete about 150 BC. At that time it came to be supported by another quadrangular room, with no passage to the hypogeum – in this were buried a few others of the family. The creation of a solemn "rupestre" facade also dates to that period. The decoration is attributed to the initiative of Scipio Aemilianus, and is a fundamental example of Hellenization of Roman culture in the course of 2nd century BC. At that period the tomb became a kind of family museum, that perpetuated and publicised the deeds of its occupants.

The last well-known use of the tomb itself was in the Claudio-Neronian period, when the daughter and the grandchild of Gnaeus Cornelius Lentulus Gaetulicus were buried here. Repairs on the tomb continued until the 4th century. After then the mainly Christian Romans (who did not have the same loyalties to the traditions of pagan Rome) apparently stopped maintaining it and lost track of it.

=== Rediscoveries and publications ===
Only the general direction of the tomb along the Via Appia to the south was known from the written sources. The question of whether it was inside or outside the city caused some confusion, apparently without realization that the city had expanded to include it. The tomb was rediscovered in 1614 in a vineyard, broken into (the term "excavated" in the modern sense does not apply), two sarcophagi were found, the inscription (titulus) of L. Cornelius, son of Barbatus, consul 259, was broken out and was sold. It changed hands many times before rejoining the collection; meanwhile, it was published by Giacomo Sirmondo in 1617 in "Antiquae inscriptionis, qua L. Scipionis Barbati, filii expressum est elogium, explanatio." This use of elogium came to apply to the entire collection (elogia Scipionum).

The owner of the property in 1614 did not alter or further publicize the tomb. He must have resealed it, hid the entrance and kept its location a secret, for whatever reasons, as it disappeared from public knowledge and was lost again, despite publication of the inscription. In 1780 the then owners of the vineyard, the brothers Sassi, who apparently had no idea it was there, broke into the tomb again during remodelling of their wine cellar. They opened it to the leading scholars of the day. Someone, perhaps them, fragmented the slabs covering the loculi, with the obvious intent of accessing the contents, being careful to preserve the inscriptions. If the act is to be attributed to the Sassi, and if the motive of treasure-hunting is to be imputed to them, they found no treasure. What they did find they turned over to the Vatican under Pope Pius VI, including the gold signet ring taken off the finger bone of Barbatus. Apparently some masonry was placed in the tomb with an obscure intent.

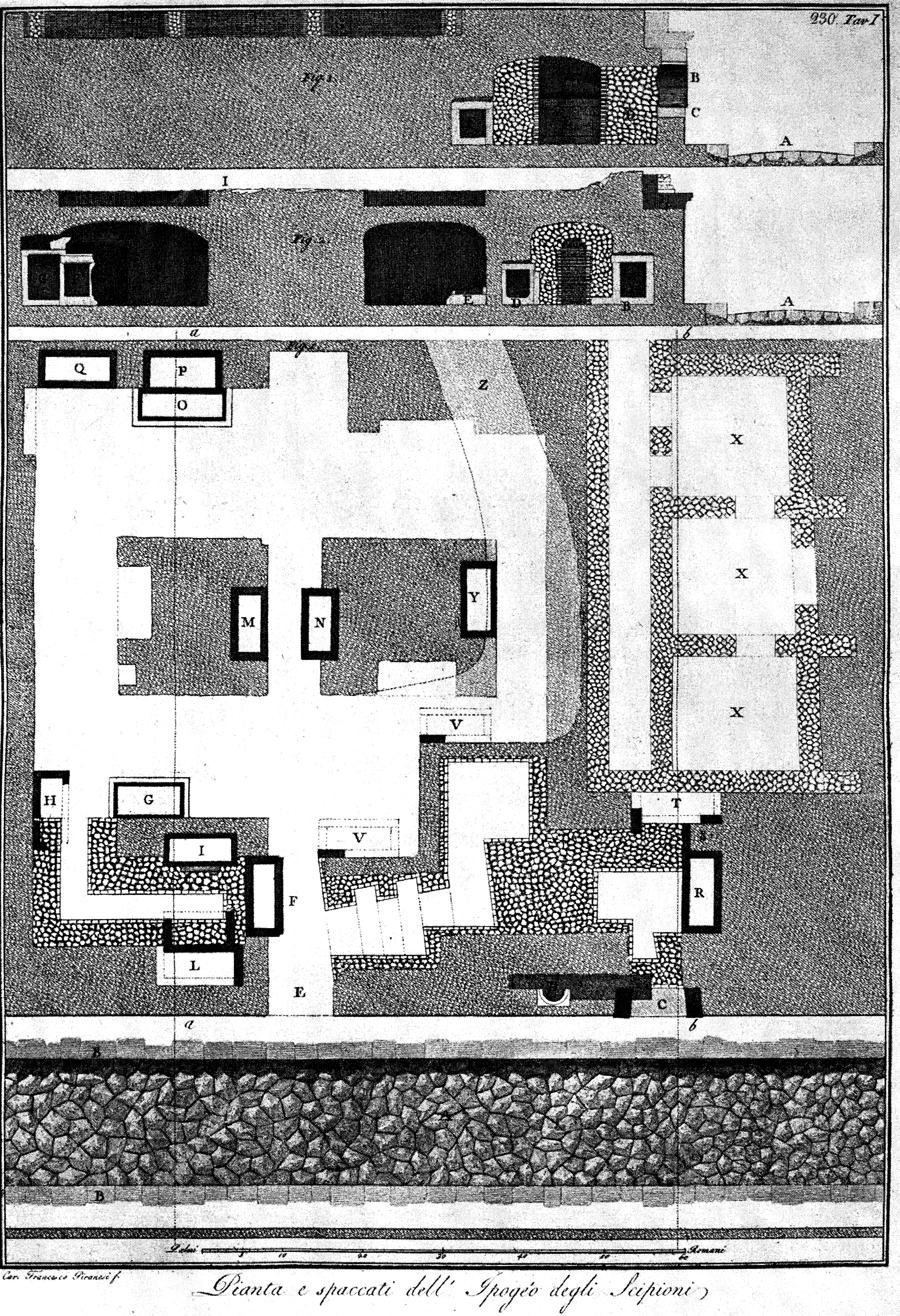
Drawing based on Piranesi's plan view, criticised by Lanciani as being too idealized.

The tomb was published in Rome in 1785 by Francesco Piranesi in "Monumenti degli Scipioni." The accuracy of the drawings in that work (actually, two works, by father and son) leaves much to be desired. For example, the corridor containing Barbatus' coffin is shown complete, when it has always ended in the rock ledge.

The tomb was subsequently neglected again (but not lost) until purchased by the city of Rome; in fact, there were reports of a Roma family living in it. The tomb was restored in 1926 by the X Ripartizione of the Comune di Roma. At that time, masonry installed in 1616 and 1780 was removed. At the present time it contains duplicates of the material in the Vatican and is well cared for. Steel pins or beams support sections in danger of collapsing.

== Art and architecture ==
The monument is divided into two distinct parts: the main complex, dug into a tuff ledge on a large square plan, and a brick-built arcade from the later period, with a separate entrance. The view expressed by Simon Bell Platner (among others) that the tomb was built over a tuff quarry is purely conjectural. No evidence exists either for or against.

The central room is divided by four large pilasters, repaired in the course of excavations to ensure the hypogeum did not collapse, with 4 long arcades along the sides and two central galleries that cross each other at right angles, giving the appearance of a grid plan.

The façade faced north-east, but only a small part of its right hand end survives, with few remains of wall paintings. It was made up of a high podium bordered by severe cornices, in which were three ashlar arches made of Aniene tuff : one led to the entrance of the hypogeum (central), one to the new room (right hand), while the third (left hand) led nowhere. This base was entirely covered in frescoes, of which only small pieces remain, showing three layers: the two oldest (from about the middle of the 2nd century BC) show historical scenes (some soldier figures can be recognised), while the last, the most recent, has a red simple decoration with stylized waves (1st century AD).

More spectacular was the upper part of the façade, with a tripartite view, semicolumns and 3 niches into which (according to Livy) were placed the statues of Scipio Africanus, his brother Scipio Asiaticus and the poet Ennius, author of a poem, Scipio.

On the left a large circular cavity has destroyed a corner of the tomb, probably by the construction and use of a lime kiln in the medieval period.

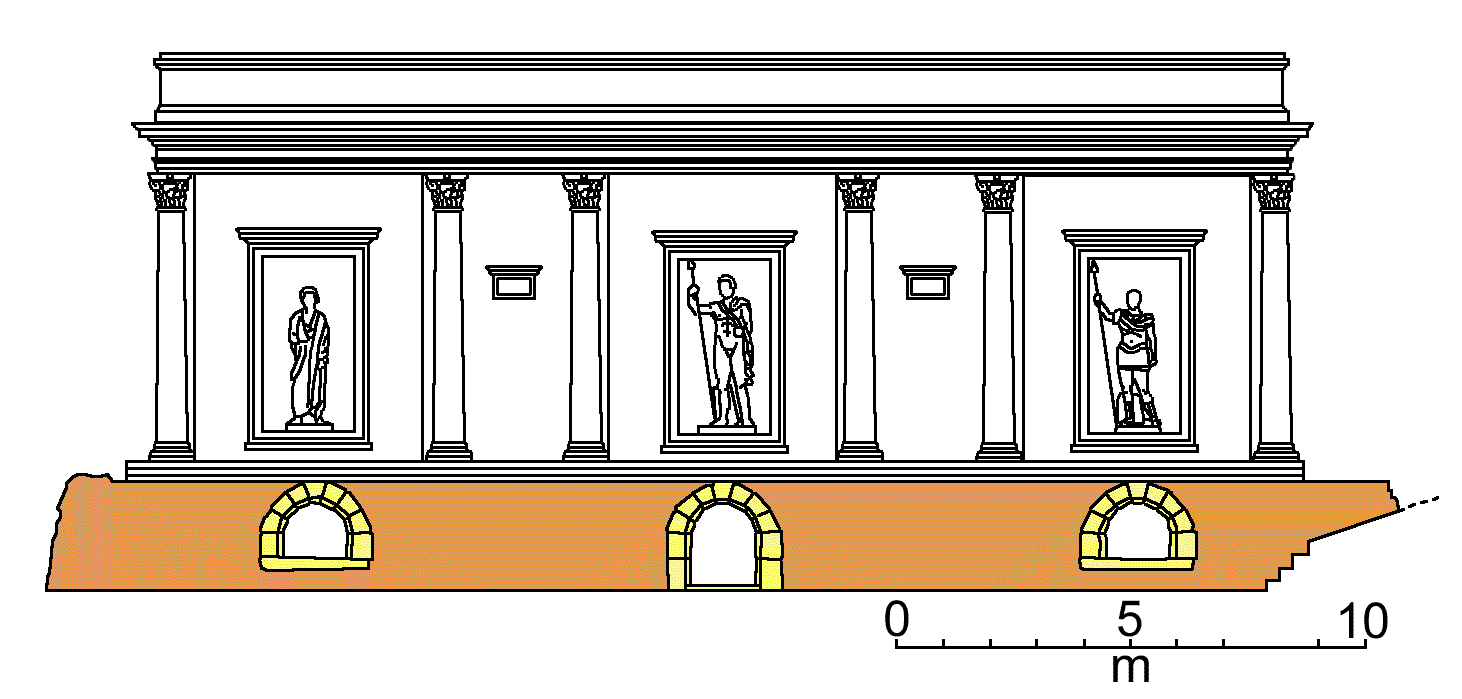
Elevation view of the tomb façade of the 2nd half of the 2nd century BC, as reconstructed by Filippo Coarelli.

== The so-called "Head of Ennius" ==
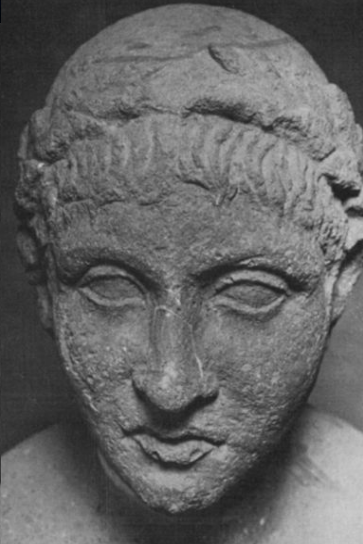
The so-called "Head of Ennius"

Two sculpted heads have been found in the tomb. One, discovered in 1780, is now in the Vatican Museums. This first head (24 cm high and made of Aniene tuff) has come to be called Ennius, who had a whole statue on the hypogeum façade according to Livy, but this attribution is incorrect, since the sources state that Ennius's statue was in marble, not tuff. The other head, of marble, was discovered in 1934 and immediately stolen; it is known only from a single photograph. It is unclear where in the tomb the heads were found; they are probably portraits of another occupant of the tomb. The slightly inclined position of the neck has caused some to believe the first head is part of a larger statue, perhaps a reclining feasting figure from a sarcophagus lid, a type common in southern Etruria from the start of the 3rd century BC.

The head's modelling is in essence but effective, with a roundish face, swollen lips, wide nose and large eyelids. The hair is indicated very vaguely and the head bears a laurel wreath with small leaves and foliage. Scholars propose dating it to the end of the 2nd century BC, when the Etruscan style of Latium underwent its first Greek influences.

== Sarcophagi and inscriptions ==
The 30 resting places approximately correspond to the number of Scipiones who lived between the beginning of the 3rd and the middle of 2nd century BC, according to Coarelli. There are two types of sarcophagi – "monolithic" (i.e.; carved from a single block of tuff) and "constructed." The latter type, which is in the majority, is an arched recess sunk into the wall in which the deceased was placed, and the opening covered by an inscribed slab with the letters painted red. English writers typically called these recesses "loculi". The recesses stand where they were, but the slabs have been moved to the Vatican. The monolithic sarcophagus of Barbatus was at the end of a corridor, in line with what once may have been a window, now the main entrance. The other sarcophagi of both types were added later as further shafts and rooms were sunk for the purpose.

The most important sarcophagi are those of Scipio Barbatus, now at the Vatican Museums, and that considered to belong to Ennius, both of substantial bulk. They do not entirely correspond with Etruscan sculpture, but show the elements of originality in Latin and particularly Roman culture, and are comparable with other Roman tombs (such as the Esquiline Necropolis) in other cities such as Tusculum.

=== Sarcophagus of Scipio Barbatus (A) ===
The name is incised on the lid (CIL VI 1284) and the epitaph (CIL VI 1285) on the front of the only intact sarcophagus (some of the decorative detail has been restored). The letters were originally painted red. A Doric-style decorative panel is above the inscription featuring roses alternating with column-like triglyphs. The top of the sarcophagus is modeled as a cushion.

=== Sarcophagus of Lucius Cornelius Scipio (B) ===
The name is on a lid fragment (CIL VI 1286) and the epitaph on a slab fragment (CIL VI 1287). The name is painted in red letters. They hang on the wall of the museum.

=== Sarcophagus of Publius Cornelius Scipio, Flamen Dialis (C) ===
All that remains of the sarcophagus, now in the Vatican, is two fragments of a stone plate containing the engraved inscription, considered one inscription, CIL VI 1288. The break obscures a few letters easily and comprehensibly restored.

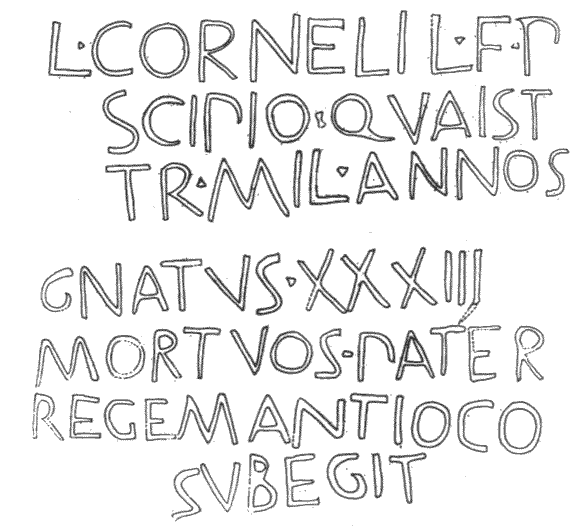
Epitaph of Asiaticus II.

=== Sarcophagus and inscription of Lucius Cornelius Scipio, son of Asiaticus (D) ===
The inscription on the sarcophagus (CIL VI 1296) survives in the Vatican and identifies the deceased as Lucius Cornelius L.f. P.n. Scipio, probably the second generation of the Cornelii Scipiones Asiatici (Lucius Cornelius Scipio Asiaticus II).

Livy records that the quaestor Lucius Cornelius Scipio was sent to meet King Prusias II of Bithynia and conduct him to Rome, when this monarch visited Italy in 167 BC. Smith reports that this quaestor is probably to be identified with the Lucius Cornelius Scipio, son of Lucius, grandson of Publius, who is commemorated in the elogia Scipionum from the Tomb of the Scipios in Rome. His father was the conqueror of Antiochus. The inscription is:

L·CORNELI L·F·P
SCIPIO·QVAIST
TR·MIL·ANNOS
GNATVS·XXX III
MORTVOS·PATER
REGEM ANTIOCO
SVBEGIT

A transliteration into modern upper and lower case letters with punctuation, with an understood letter in brackets, is:

L. Corneli. L. f. P. [n]
Scipio, quaist.,
tr. mil., annos
gnatus XXXIII
mortuos. Pater
regem Antioco subegit.

A translation into classical Latin is:

Lucius Cornelius Lucii filius Publii nepos Scipio. Quaestor Tribunus Militum annos natus XXXIII mortuus. Pater regem Antiochum subegit.

A translation into English is:

Lucius Cornelius, son of Lucius, grandson of Publius, Scipio, quaestor, military tribune, died aged 33 years. His father conquered king Antiochus.

== See also ==
- List of ancient monuments in Rome
- Old Latin

== Bibliography ==
- Jacobs, John (2023-06-28). "Review of: L'area archeologica del Sepolcro degli Scipioni a Roma: analisi delle strutture di eta imperiale e tardo antica". Bryn Mawr Classical Review. ISSN 1055-7660.
- Lanciani, Rodolfo Amedeo (1897). The Ruins and Excavations of Ancient Rome: A Companion Book for Students and Travelers. Boston and New York: Houghton, Mifflin and Company. pp. 321–327.
- Ricci, Corrado (2003). Vatican: Its History Its Treasures (illustrated ed.). Kessinger Publishing. ISBN 0766139417.

Preceded by Tomb of Hilarus Fuscus	Landmarks of Rome; Tomb of the Scipios	Succeeded by Tombs of Via Latina
