= Cornelius Scipio Salvito =

Roman politician

Cornelius Scipio ‘Salvito’ (the agnomen Salvito was conferred on him due to his resemblance to a mime artist of the same name) was a minor member of the gens Cornelia who lived in the late Roman Republic. He was perhaps a descendant of Scipio Africanus, the Roman general who defeated Hannibal, through his second son Lucius Cornelius Scipio.

Salvito was, according to Plutarch and Suetonius, "a contemptible nobody", who was taken by Julius Caesar in 46 BC on his North African campaign against the remnants of Pompey's forces, led by Quintus Caecilius Metellus Pius Scipio Nasica. Because of a long-standing belief that only a Scipio could be victorious in Africa, and because he was facing a Scipio, Caesar placed Salvito at the front of his army, either as a good luck charm to calm his nervous troops, or to demonstrate his contempt to Scipio Nasica. Caesar forced him to attack the enemy frequently and to bring on the battle.

== Sources ==
- Cassius Dio, Roman History, Book 42
- Plutarch, Life of Caesar
- Suetonius, Life of Julius Caesar
