= Gnaeus Cornelius Scipio Hispanus =

Gnaeus Cornelius Scipio Hispanus of the Scipiones branch of the gens Cornelia, was a Roman politician.

He was the son of Gnaeus Cornelius Scipio Hispallus. He served as one of the decemviri stlitibus judicandis and as a military tribune before 150 BC, and became quaestor around that date. He then became aedile, probably in 141 BC. He was a praetor in 139 BC. As praetor, he expelled the astrologers (Chaldaeans and Jews) from the city of Rome.

== Sources ==
- Valerius Maximus 1,3,3

== Bibliography ==
- Karl-Ludwig Elvers: [I 79] C. Scipio Hispanus, Cn.. In: Der Neue Pauly. vol. 3 (1997), col. 184.
