= Publius Cornelius Sulla (praetor 186 BC) =

Roman praetor in 186 BC; grandfather of the dictator Sulla

Publius Cornelius Sulla was a Roman politician of the second century BC. He is most significant for having been the grandfather of the dictator and reformer Lucius Cornelius Sulla through his son Lucius Cornelius Sulla. He was the son of Publius Cornelius Sulla, the first member of the family to bear the name Sulla, and the brother of Servius Cornelius Sulla. He was elected praetor in 186 BC and assigned to Sicily.
