= Tlepolemus Cornelius =

Ancient Roman artist and agent of Gaius Verres in the 1st century BCE

Tlepolemus Cornelius was an artist of ancient Rome who lived around the 1st century BCE. He and his brother Hiero were called by Cicero the "hunting dogs" (canes venatici) of the notorious Roman nobleman Gaius Verres, accused by Cicero in his In Verrem of using his position to plunder valuable artworks from religious sanctuaries.

The two brothers were natives of Cibyra, whence they fled, under the suspicion of having robbed the temple of Apollo, and took themselves to Verres, who was then in Asia. There they lived as his dependents, and during his government of Sicily they performed for him the service of hunting out the works of art which seemed to be worth stealing. They were both artists, Tlepolemus being a painter, and Hiero a sculptor in wax.

The name of these brothers does not appear to have originally been "Cornelius". Cicero seems to imply that they and other partisans of Verres (such as Artemidorus Cornelius) did not previously have the name "Cornelius", but later suddenly assumed it together. It is believed they were at first slaves, and afterwards, on being freed by their master -- perhaps Gnaeus Cornelius Dolabella, whom Verres had served under -- took the name of "Cornelius", similar to how the 10,000 manumitted slaves of Sulla were also given their former master's name.
