= Cornelius Severus =

Roman poet and novelist active during rule of Augustus

Cornelius Severus was an Augustan Age Roman epic poet who is mentioned in Quintilian and Ovid. Quintilian attests to an epic about the Sicilian Wars, Bellum Siculum, and Ovid refers to a long poem on Rome's ancient kings, which may be Res Romanae. This work, such as it is known, exists only in quotations by other authors. Seneca quoted twenty-five lines from it on the death of Cicero, which can be found in the Oxford University Press Oxford Book of Latin Verse (1912 ed.).
