= Karl-Ludwig Elvers =

German historian

Dr. Karl-Ludwig Gotthard Elvers (born 2 November 1962 in Berlin) is a German historian.

After school and high school in Berlin, Elvers studied Latin and history at the Free University Berlin. In 1988 he passed his state examination, and in 1992 became research assistant at the Commission for Ancient History. Then he moved to the Ruhr University Bochum, where he has taught since 1994 as a teacher in higher education employment. In 1993 his doctorate at the University of Berlin was a thesis on history in Cicero's speeches and aspects of the late Republican understanding of history.

His main research interest is in the intellectual history of the late Roman Republic. He teaches all aspects of ancient history, but focuses on the political history of the Roman Empire. His duties at the university include caretaking of the Institute's coin collection.

Elvers is the department editor of the German encyclopedia of classical scholarship Der neue Pauly for the prosopography of the Roman Republic, and wrote numerous articles for the work.
