= Publius Cornelius Scipio (son of Scipio Africanus) =

Eldest son of Scipio Africanus (died 170 BC)

Publius Cornelius P.f. P.n. Scipio (living circa 211 BC/205 BC–170 BC) was the eldest son of Scipio Africanus and his wife Aemilia Paulla. (Note: The dates of Publius are uncertain, given that the dates of his parents's marriage are also uncertain. Some historians argue that Scipio Africanus married Aemilia after he returned from Spain in 206 BC, pointing to Scipio's reported comment about his betrothed wife in 209 BC (as reported by Livy). However, given that his younger brother was elected praetor in 174 BC, it is unlikely that either brother was so young as to be barely eligible for the Senate in that year. It is more likely that Scipio married Aemilia Paulla circa 212 BC or earlier, and that his two elder sons were born by 209 BC. This would make sense of the younger son's being captured by pirates circa 194–192 BC; if he was travelling to Greece or on military service, Lucius would be old enough.) He was chosen augur from 180 BC. Little information on him survives, as he did not stand for any of the high offices or have a public career of note. Cicero relates that he was in poor health, the particulars of which he refuses to mention, stating that "we ought not to reproduce ... their faults (of ancestors)." Scipio died young from his poor health.

Scipio had a son also named Publius Cornelius Scipio, who died before achieving any political office. For remedy according to Roman custom he adopted as son and heir his first cousin Scipio Aemilianus (b. 185 BC) who was probably born Lucius Aemilius Paullus, second and younger surviving son of Lucius Aemilius Paullus Macedonicus by his first wife Papiria Masonis. This adoption probably took place after his brother Lucius died childless. Thereafter the son used the name Publius Cornelius Scipio Aemilianus Africanus.

Cicero adds that the eldest son of Scipio Africanus had "more ample intellectual culture" than his father and that the state endured a loss in his not being able to seek high office.
