= Gnaeus Cornelius Scipio Hispallus =

Roman politician in the second century BC

Gnaeus Cornelius Scipio Hispallus was a Roman politician in the second century BC.

== Family ==
Gnaeus Cornelius Scipio Hispallus was a member of the patrician family of the Cornelii Scipiones. His father was Gnaeus Cornelius Scipio Calvus, the consul of 222 BC, and his uncle was Publius Cornelius Scipio, father of Scipio Africanus. His brother was Publius Cornelius Scipio Nasica, consul of 191 BC. In 139 BC, serving as Praetor, the son of Cornelius Hispallus, Gnaeus Cornelius Scipio Hispanus, expelled the Jews and Chaldeans from Rome.

== Career ==
Hispallus was named Pontiff in 199 BC and elected Praetor in 179 BC. In 176 BC, he was elected consul together with Quintus Petillius Spurinus, but died the same year of an illness in the town of Cumis. Gaius Valerius Laevinus succeeded as consul in his place.
