= Publius Cornelius Sulla (praetor 212 BC) =

3rd century BC Roman commander and politician

Publius Cornelius Sulla was a Roman commander and politician during the Roman Republic. He was the great-grandfather of Lucius Cornelius Sulla, who would become the dictator of Rome. His father was flamen Dialis between c. 270 and c. 250 BC, and his grandfather was Publius Cornelius Rufinus, who served twice as consul during the Samnite Wars. Publius was elected praetor urbanus with the additional jurisdiction of the praetor peregrinus in 212 BC. He presided over the first ludi Apollinares, thereby instituting an annual Roman festival in honour of Apollo. He was also Decemvir Sacris Facundis.

== Bibliography ==
- T. Robert S. Broughton, The Magistrates of the Roman Republic, American Philological Association, 1952–1986.
