= Publius Cornelius Scipio Barbatus =

Publius Cornelius Scipio Barbatus was a Roman statesman who served as the Consul in 328 BC and Dictator in 306 BC. His primary duty as the dictator was to hold a comitia to elect new consuls. He later served as Pontifex maximus.
