= Lucius Cornelius Scipio Asiaticus =

Roman general and statesman (d. after 183 BCE)

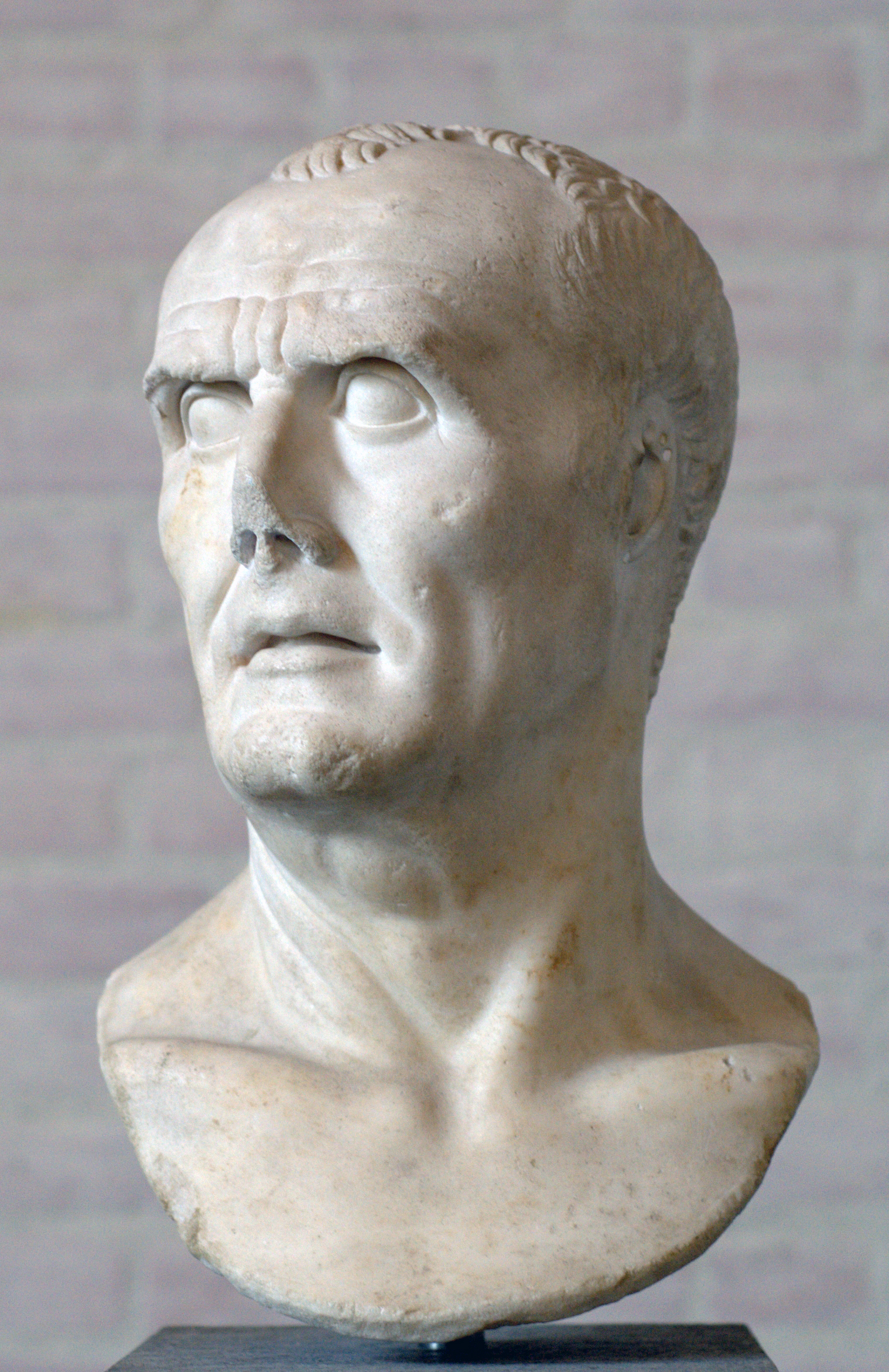
The so-called "bust of Marius" in the Munich Glyptothek, identified by Filippo Coarelli as that of Asiaticus, originally located on the facade of the Tomb of the Scipios.

Lucius Cornelius Scipio Asiaticus (properly Asiagenes; 3rd century BC – after 183 BC) was a general and statesman of the Roman Republic. He was the son of Publius Cornelius Scipio and the younger brother of Scipio Africanus. He was elected consul in 190 BC, and later that year led (with his brother) the Roman forces to victory at the Battle of Magnesia.

Although his career may be eclipsed by the shadow of his elder brother, Lucius' life is noteworthy in several respects.

== Family background ==
Lucius belonged to the patrician gens Cornelia, one of the most important gentes of the Republic, which counted more consulships than any other. He was the son of Publius, the consul of 218 who died against the Carthaginians at the Battle of the Upper Baetis in 211, and Pomponia, the daughter of Manius Pomponius Matho, consul in 233. Lucius also had an elder brother, Publius, better known as Scipio Africanus, who was the leading man of his generation and the vanquisher of Hannibal at the Battle of Zama in 202. Lucius was very close to his brother throughout his career, but had a conflicting relationship with his cousin Scipio Nasica since both of them were born circa 228, and therefore fought for the same magistracies at each stage of their cursus honorum.

Lucius' wife is not known.

== Early career ==
Lucius served under his brother in Spain during the Second Punic War, defeating the Carthaginian commander Larus in a famous duel, and in 208 BC took a town on his own. In 206 BC, he was sent to the Senate with news of the victory in Spain. He was curule aedile in 195 BC, and praetor assigned to Sicily in 193 BC, helped by the influence of his brother. He was a candidate for consul in 191 BC, but lost to his first cousin Publius Cornelius Scipio Nasica.

== Consul ==
He was finally elected consul in 190 BC with his co-consul being his brother's old second-in-command Gaius Laelius. According to Smith, the senate had not much confidence in his abilities (Cic. Phil. xi. 17), and it was only through the offer of his brother Africanus to accompany him as a legate that he obtained the province of Greece and the conduct of the war against Antiochus.

He asserted himself against his brother by refusing the peace negotiated with the Aetolians by the latter. However, Publius insisted that as supreme commander at Magnesia, Lucius should receive full credit for the victory over Antiochus. Upon his return to Rome, he celebrated a triumph (189 BC) and requested the title "Asiaticus" to signify his conquest of Western Asia Minor.

According to some biblical commentators, Asiaticus is the "commander" referred to in Daniel 11:18, where it says that "a commander will put an end to his insolence" (NIV).

== Political fall ==
Towards the end of his brother's life, Lucius was accused of misappropriating some of the funds collected from Antiochus as an indemnity. Africanus, then Princeps Senatus, was outraged, going so far as to destroy the campaign's financial records while speaking in the Senate, as an act of defiance.

After his brother's death (c. 183 BC), Lucius was imprisoned for this alleged theft. He was eventually pardoned by the tribune Tiberius Gracchus, although he was forced to sell his property and pay the state a lump sum. Roman historians report that he refused to accept any gifts or loans from his friends to pay the penalty.

During his brother's lifetime in 185 BC, Lucius celebrated with great splendour the games which he had vowed in his war with Antiochus. Valerius of Antium related that he obtained the necessary money during an embassy on which he was sent after his condemnation, to settle the disputes between the kings Antiochus and Eumenes.

He was a candidate for the censorship in 184 BC, but was defeated by an old enemy of his family, M. Porcius Cato, who deprived Lucius of his Public Horse at the review of the equites.

== Descendants ==
Lucius had descendants, the Cornelii Scipiones Asiatici, the last of whom was the consul Lucius Cornelius Scipio Asiaticus who had an adoptive son. This son passed into obscurity after 82 BC.

== See also ==
- Scipio-Paullus-Gracchus family tree

== Bibliography ==
=== Ancient sources ===
- Fasti Capitolini.
- Titus Livius (Livy), History of Rome.
- Plutarch, Parallel lives.
- Polybius, Historiae (The Histories).

=== Modern sources ===
- Alan E. Astin, Cato the Censor, Oxford University Press, 1978.
- Briscoe, John (1981). A Commentary on Livy Books XXXIV–XXXVII. Oxford: Clarendon Press. ISBN 0-19-814455-5.
- ——, A Commentary on Livy, Books 38–40, Oxford University Press, 2007.
- ——, A Commentary on Livy, Books 41–45, Oxford University Press, 2012.
- T. Robert S. Broughton, The Magistrates of the Roman Republic, American Philological Association, 1952–1960.
- Paul J. Burton, Friendship and Empire, Roman Diplomacy and Imperialism in the Middle Republic (353–146 BC), Cambridge University Press, 2011.
- Filippo Coarelli, "I ritratti di ‘Mario’ e ‘Silla’ a Monaco e il sepolcro degli Scipioni", Eutopia nuova serie, II/ 1, 2002, pp. 47–75.
- J. A. Crook, F. W. Walbank, M. W. Frederiksen, R. M. Ogilvie (editors), The Cambridge Ancient History, vol. VIII, Rome and the Mediterranean to 133 B.C., Cambridge University Press, 1989.
- Henri Etcheto, Les Scipions. Famille et pouvoir à Rome à l’époque républicaine, Bordeaux, Ausonius Éditions, 2012.
- Friedrich Münzer, Roman Aristocratic Parties and Families, translated by Thérèse Ridley, Johns Hopkins University Press, 1999 (originally published in 1920).
- August Pauly, Georg Wissowa, Friedrich Münzer, et alii, Realencyclopädie der Classischen Altertumswissenschaft (abbreviated PW), J. B. Metzler, Stuttgart, 1894–1980.
- Francis X. Ryan, Rank and Participation in the Republican Senate, Stuttgart, Franz Steiner Verlag, 1998.
- Howard Hayes Scullard, Roman Politics 220–150 B. C., Oxford University Press, 1951.
- Lily Ross Taylor and T. Robert S. Broughton, "The Order of the Two Consuls' Names in the Yearly Lists", Memoirs of the American Academy in Rome, 19 (1949), pp. 3–14.
- Frank William Walbank, A Commentary on Polybius, Oxford University Press, 1979.

Political offices
Preceded by P. Cornelius Scipio Nasica; M'. Acilius Glabrio	Roman consul 190 BC; With: Gaius Laelius	Succeeded by M. Fulvius Nobilior; Gn. Manlius Vulso
