= List of state leaders in the 4th century BC =

State leaders in the 5th century BC – State leaders in the 3rd century BC – State leaders by year

This is a list of state leaders in the 4th century BC (400–301 BC).

== Africa: North ==
Carthage

- Carthage (complete list) –

Didonian
- Himilco II, King (406–396 BC)
- Mago II, King (396–375 BC)
- Mago III, King (375–344 BC)
- Hanno III, King (344–340 BC)
Hannonian
- Hanno the Great, prince (340–337 BC)
- Gisco, King (337–330 BC)
- Hamilcar II, King (330–309 BC)
- Bomilcar, King (309–308 BC)

Egypt: Late Period

- Twenty-eighth Dynasty of the Late Period (complete list) –

- Amyrtaeus, Pharaoh (404–398 BC)

- Twenty-ninth Dynasty of the Late Period (complete list) –

- Nefaarud I, Pharaoh (398–393 BC)
- Psammuthes, Pharaoh (393 BC)
- Hakor, Pharaoh (393–380 BC)

- Thirtieth Dynasty of the Late Period (complete list) –

- Nectanebo I, Pharaoh (380–362 BC)
- Teos, Pharaoh (362–360 BC)
- Nectanebo II, Pharaoh (360–343 BC)

- Khabash Revolt of the Second Persian occupation of Egypt (Thirty-first Dynasty)

- Khabash, rebel Pharaoh (c.338–c.335 BC)

Egypt: Ptolemaic Kingdom

- Ptolemaic Kingdom of Egypt (complete list) –

- Ptolemy I Soter, Pharaoh (305–283/282 BC)

Kush

- Kush (complete list) –

- Harsiotef, King (404–369 BC)
- (unknown Qore), King (369–350 BC)
- Akhraten, King (350–335 BC)
- Amanibakhi, King (4th century BC)
- Nastasen, King (335–315 BC)

Numidia

- Numidia: Eastern Numidia (complete list) –

- Zelalsen, King (344–274 BC)

== Asia ==
=== Asia: East ===
China: Warring States period

- Zhou, China: Eastern Zhou (complete list) –

- An, King (401–376 BC)
- Lie, King (375–369 BC)
- Xian, King (368–321 BC)
- Shenjing, King (320–315 BC)
- Nan, King (314–256 BC)

- Chu (complete list) –

- Dao, King (401–381 BC)
- Su, King (380–370 BC)
- Xuan, King (369–340 BC)
- Wei, King (339–329 BC)
- Huai, King (328–299 BC)

- Han (complete list) –

- Jing, Marquess (408–400 BC)
- Lie, Marquess (399–387 BC)
- Wen, Marquess (386–377 BC)
- Ai, Marquess (376–374 BC)
- Gong, Marquess (374–363 BC)
- Xi, Marquess (362–233 BC)
- Xuanhui, King (332–312 BC)
- Xiang, King (311–296 BC)

- Qi: House of Jiang (complete list) –

- Kang, Duke (404–386 BC)

- Qi: House of Tian (complete list) –

- Tai, Duke (404–384 BC)
- Tian Yan, Marquess (383–375 BC)
- Huan, Duke (374–357 BC)
- Wei, King (356–320 BC)
- Xuan, King (319–300 BC)
- Min, King (300–283 BC)

- Qin (complete list) –

- Jian, Duke (414–400 BC)
- Hui II, Duke (399–387 BC)
- Chuzi II, Duke (386–385 BC)
- Xian, Duke (384–362 BC)
- Xiao, Duke (361–338 BC)
- Huiwen, King (337–311 BC)
- Wu, King (310–307 BC)
- Zhaoxiang, King (306–251 BC)

- Wei (complete list) –

- Wen, Marquess (445–396 BC)
- Wu, Marquess (396–370 BC)
- Hui, King (370–319 BC)
- Xiang, King (319–296 BC)

- Zhao (complete list) –

- Lie, Marquess (409–387 BC)
- Jing, Marquess (387–375 BC)
- Cheng, Marquess (375–350 BC)
- Su, Marquess (350–326 BC)
- Wuling, King (326–299 BC)

=== Asia: Southeast ===
Vietnam

- Hồng Bàng dynasty (complete list) –

- Hùng Duệ Vương, King (408–258 BC)

=== Asia: South ===
India

- Magadha: Shishunaga dynasty (complete list) –

- Shishunaga, King (413–395 BC)
- Kalashoka, King (395–367 BC)
- Mahanandin, King (367–345 BC)

- Magadha: Nanda dynasty (complete list) –

- Mahapadma Nanda, Emperor (c.345–c.329 BC)
- Dhana, Emperor (c.329–c.321 BC)

- Maurya Empire (complete list) –

- Chandragupta, Emperor (324–297 BC)

Sri Lanka

- Anuradhapura Kingdom (complete list) –

- Pandukabhaya, King (377–367 BC)
- Mutasiva, King (367–307 BC)
- Devanampiya Tissa, King (307–267 BC)

- Kingdom of Upatissa Nuwara (complete list) –

- Pandukabhaya, King (437–377 BC)

=== Asia: West ===
- First Persian Empire: Achaemenid Empire(complete list) –

- Artaxerxes II, Great King, Shah (404–358 BC)
- Artaxerxes III, Great King, Shah (358–338 BC)
- Arses, Great King, Shah (338–336 BC)
- Darius III, Great King, Shah (336–330 BC)
- Bessus, Great King, Shah (330–329 BC)

- Antigonid dynasty (complete list) –

- Antigonus I Monophthalmus, King in Syria and Asia Minor (306–301 BC)

- Atropatene (complete list) -

- Atropates

- Satrap (323 BC-321 BC)
- King (c.321 BC)

- Kingdom of Bithynia (complete list) –

- Bas, Dynast (376–326 BC)
- Zipoetes I, Dynast (326–297 BC)

- Bosporan Kingdom:Spartocids dynasty (complete list) –

- Satyrus I, King (433–389 BC)
- Seleucus, King (433–393 BC)
- Leucon I, King (389–349 BC)
- Gorgippus, King (389–349 BC)
- Spartacus II, King (349–344 BC)
- Pairisades I, King (349–311 BC)
- Satyrus II, King (311–310 BC)
- Prytanis, King (310 BC)
- Eumelos, King (310–304 BC)
- Spartacus III, King (304–284 BC)

- Kingdom of Cappadocia (complete list) –

- Ariarathes I

- Satrap (350–331 BC)
- King (331–322 BC)

- Ariarathes II, Suzerain King (301–280 BC)

- Colchis (complete list) –

- Akes, King (late 4th century BC)
- Kuji, King (325–280 BC)

- Seleucid Empire (complete list) –

- Seleucus I Nicator, King (305–281 BC)

== Europe ==
=== Europe: Balkans ===
- Athens (complete list) –

- Xenainetos, Archon (401–400 BC)
- Laches, Archon (400–399 BC)
- Aristocrates, Archon (399–398 BC)
- Euthykles, Archon (398–397 BC)
- Souniades, Archon (397–396 BC)
- Phormion, Archon (396–395 BC)
- Diophandus, Archon (395–394 BC)
- Ebulides, Archon (394–393 BC)
- Demostratos, Archon (393–392 BC)
- Philocles, Archon (392–391 BC)
- Nicoteles, Archon (391–390 BC)
- Demostratos, Archon (390–389 BC)
- Antipatros, Archon (389–388 BC)
- Pyrgion, Archon (388–387 BC)
- Theodotos, Archon (387–386 BC)
- Mystichides, Archon (386–385 BC)
- Dexitheus, Archon (385–384 BC)
- Dieitrephes, Archon (384–383 BC)
- Phanostratos, Archon (383–382 BC)
- Euandros, Archon (382–381 BC)
- Demophilos, Archon (381–380 BC)

- Pytheas, Archon (380–379 BC)
- Nikon, Archon (379–378 BC)
- Nausinikos, Archon (378–377 BC)
- Kalleas, Archon (377–376 BC)
- Charisandrus, Archon (376–375 BC)
- Hippodamas, Archon (375–374 BC)
- Socratides, Archon (374–373 BC)
- Asteius, Archon (373–372 BC)
- Alcisthenes, Archon (372–371 BC)
- Phrasicleides, Archon (371–370 BC)
- Dyscinitus, Archon (370–369 BC)
- Lysistratus, Archon (369–368 BC)
- Nausigenes, Archon (368–367 BC)
- Polyzelus, Archon (367–366 BC)
- Ciphisodorus, Archon (366–365 BC)
- Chion, Archon (365–364 BC)
- Timocrates, Archon (364–363 BC)
- Charicleides, Archon (363–362 BC)
- Molon, Archon (362–361 BC)
- Nicophemus, Archon (361–360 BC)
- Callimides, Archon (360–359 BC)

- Eucharistus, Archon (359–358 BC)
- Ciphisodotus, Archon (358–357 BC)
- Agathocles, Archon (357–356 BC)
- Elpines, Archon (356–355 BC)
- Callistratus, Archon (355–354 BC)
- Diotemus, Archon (354–353 BC)
- Thudemus, Archon (353–352 BC)
- Aristodemus, Archon (352–351 BC)
- Theellus, Archon (351–350 BC)
- Apollodorus, Archon (350–349 BC)
- Callimachus, Archon (349–348 BC)
- Theophilus, Archon (348–347 BC)
- Themistocles, Archon (347–346 BC)
- Archias, Archon (346–345 BC)
- Ebulus, Archon (345–344 BC)
- Lyciscus, Archon (344–343 BC)
- Pythodotus, Archon (343–342 BC)
- Sosigenes, Archon (342–341 BC)
- Nicomachus, Archon (341–340 BC)
- Theophrastus, Archon (340–339 BC)
- Lysimachides, Archon (339–338 BC)

- Epirus (complete list) –

- Tharrhypas, King (430–392 BC)
- Alcetas I, King (390, 385–370 BC)
- Neoptolemos I, King (370–357 BC, 317–313 BC)
- Arybbas, King (373–343 BC)
- Alexander I, King (342–331 BC)
- Aeacides, King (330–317 BC)
- Alcetas II, King (313–306 BC)
- Pyrrhus I, King (307–302 BC, 297–272 BC)
- Neoptolemos II, King (302–297 ВС)

- Macedonia:

- Argead dynasty (complete list) –

- Archelaus I, King (413–399 BC)
- Craterus, King (399 BC)
- Orestes, King (399–396 BC)
- Aeropus II, King (399–393 BC)
- Archelaus II, King (396–393 BC)
- Amyntas II, King (393 BC)
- Pausanias, King (393 BC)
- Argaeus II, King (393–392 BC)
- Amyntas III, King (392–370 BC)
- Alexander II, King (370–368 BC)
- Ptolemy, Regent (368–365 BC)
- Perdiccas III, King (368–359 BC)
- Amyntas IV, King (359 BC)
- Philip II, King (359–336 BC)
- Alexander the Great, King (336–323 BC)
- Philip III Arrhidaeus, King (323–317 BC)
- Alexander IV, King (317–309 BC)

- Antipatrid dynasty (complete list) –

- Cassander, King (305–297 BC)

- Odrysian kingdom of Thrace (complete list) –

- Amadocus I, King (408–389 BC)
- Seuthes II, King (405–387 BC)
- Hebryzelmis, King (387–383 BC)
- Cotys I, King (384–359 BC)
- Cersobleptes, King, eastern Thrace (359–341 BC)
- Berisades, King, western Thrace (359–352 BC)
- Amatokos II, King, middle Thrace (359–351 BC)
- Cetriporis, King, western Thrace (356–351 BC)
- Teres II, King, middle Thrace (351–342 BC)
- Seuthes III, King (331–300 BC)

- Paeonia (complete list) –

- Agis, King (?–359 BC)
- Lycceius, King (356–340 BC)
- Patraus, King (340–315 BC)
- Audoleon, King (315–285 BC)

- Sparta

- Eurypontid dynasty (complete list) –

- Agis II, King (c.427–401/400 BC)
- Agesilaus II, King (c.401/400–360 BC)
- Archidamus III, King (c.360–338 BC)
- Agis III, King (c.338–331 BC)
- Eudamidas I, King (c.331–305 BC)
- Archidamus IV, King (c.305–275 BC)

- Agiad dynasty (complete list) –

- Pausanias of Sparta, King (c.409-395 BC)
- Agesipolis I, King (c.395–380 BC)
- Cleombrotus I, King (c.380–371 BC)
- Agesipolis II, King (c.371–369 BC)
- Cleomenes II, King (c.369–309 BC)
- Areus I, King (c.309–265 BC)

=== Europe: East ===
- Dacia (complete list) –

- Histrianorum, King (c.339 BC)
- Cothelas, King (4th century BC)

=== Europe: South ===
- Roman Republic (complete list) –

- 400 – Consular Tribunes: P. Licinius Calvus Esquilinus, P. Maelius Capitolinus, P. Manlius Vulso, Sp. Furius Medullinus, L. Titinius Pansa Saccus, L. Publilius Philo Vulscus
- 399 – Consular Tribunes: Cn. Genucius Augurinus, C. Duillius Longus, L. Atilius Priscus, M. Veturius Crassus Cicurinus, M. Pomponius Rufus, Volero Publilius Philo
- 398 – Consular Tribunes: L. Valerius Potitus, L. Furius Medullinus, M. Valerius Lactucinus Maximus, Q. Servilius Fidenas, M. Furius Camillus, Q. Sulpicius Camerinus Cornutus
- 397 – Consular Tribunes: L. Iulius Iullus, A. Postumius Albinus Regillensis, L. Furius Medullinus, P. Cornelius Maluginensis, L. Sergius Fidenas, A. Manlius Vulso Capitolinus
- 396 – Consular Tribunes: L. Titinius Pansa Saccus, Q. Manlius Vulso Capitolinus, P. Licinius Calvus Esquilinus, Cn. Genucius Augurinus, P. Maelius Capitolinus, L. Atilius Priscus
- 395 – Consular Tribunes: P. Cornelius Cossus, L. Furius Medullinus, P. Cornelius Scipio, Q. Servilius Fidenas, K. Fabius Ambustus, M. Valerius Lactucinus Maximus
- 394 – Consular Tribunes: M. Furius Camillus, L. Valerius Potitus Poplicola, L. Furius Medullinus, Sp. Postumius Albinus Regillensis, C. Aemilius Mamercinus, P. Cornelius Scipio
- 393

- L. Valerius Potitus Poplicola, Consul
- Ser. Cornelius Maluginensis, Consul
- L. Lucretius Tricipitinus Flavus, Consul suffectus
- Ser. Sulpicius Camerinus, Consul suffectus

- 392

- L. Valerius Potitus Poplicola, Consul
- M. Manlius Capitolinus, Consul

- 391 – Consular Tribunes: L. Lucretius Tricipitinus Flavus, L. Furius Medullinus, Ser. Sulpicius Camerinus, Agrippa Furius Fusus, L. Aemilius Mamercinus, C. Aemilius Mamercinus
- 390 – Consular Tribunes: Q. Fabius Ambustus, Q. Sulpicius Longus, K. Fabius Ambustus, Q. Servilius Fidenas, N. Fabius Ambustus, P. Cornelius Maluginensis
- 389 – Consular Tribunes: L. Valerius Potitus Poplicola, A. Manlius Capitolinus, L. Verginius Tricostus Esquilinus (II?), L. Aemilius Mamercinus, P. Cornelius, L. Postumius Albinus Regillensis
- 388 – Consular Tribunes: T. Quinctius Cincinnatus Capitolinus, Q. Servilius Fidenas, L. Iulius Iullus, L. Aquillius Corvus, L. Lucretius Tricipitinus Flavus, Ser. Sulpicius Rufus
- 387 – Consular Tribunes: L. Papirius Cursor, Cn. Sergius Fidenas Coxo, L. Aemilius Mamercinus, Licinus Menenius Lanatus, L. Valerius Potitus Poplicola
- 386 – Consular Tribunes: M. Furius Camillus, Ser. Cornelius Maluginensis, Q. Servilius Fidenas, L. Quinctius Cincinnatus, L. Horatius Pulvillus, P. Valerius Potitus Poplicola
- 385 – Consular Tribunes: A. Manlius Capitolinus, P. Cornelius, T. Quinctius (Cincinnatus?) Capitolinus, L. Papirius Cursor, L. Quinctius Capitolinus, Cn. Sergius Fidenas Coxo
- 384 – Consular Tribunes: Ser. Cornelius Maluginensis, P. Valerius Potitus Poplicola, M. Furius Camillus, Ser. Sulpicius Rufus, C. Papirius Crassus, T. Quinctius Cincinnatus Capitolinus
- 383 – Consular Tribunes: L. Valerius Potitus Poplicola, A. Manlius Capitolinus, Ser. Sulpicius Rufus, L. Lucretius Tricipitinus Flavus, L. Aemilius Mamercinus, M. Trebonius
- 382 – Consular Tribunes: Sp. Papirius Crassus, L. Papirius Mugillanus, Ser. Cornelius Maluginensis, Q. Servilius Fidenas, C. Sulpicius Camerinus, L. Aemilius Mamercinus V
- 381 – Consular Tribunes: M. Furius Camillus, A. Postumius Albinus Regillensis, L. Postumius Albinus Regillensis, L. Furius Medullinus, L. Lucretius Tricipitinus Flavus, M. Fabius Ambustus
- 380 – Consular Tribunes: L. Valerius Potitus Poplicola, P. Valerius Potitus Poplicola, Ser. Cornelius Maluginensis, Licinus Menenius Lanatus, C. Sulpicius Peticus, L. Aemilius Mamercinus, Cn. Sergius Fidenas Coxo, Ti. Papirius Crassus, L. Papirius Mugillanus
- 379 – Consular Tribunes: P. Manlius Capitolinus, Cn. Manlius Vulso, L. Iulius Iullus, C. Sextilius, M. Albinius, L. Antistius, P. Trebonius, C. Erenucius?
- 378 – Consular Tribunes: Sp. Furius Medullinus, Q. Servillius Fidenas, Licinus Menenius Lanatus, P. Cloelius Siculus, M. Horatius Pulvillus, L. Geganius Macerinus
- 377 – Consular Tribunes: L. Aemilius Mamercinus, P. Valerius Potitus Poplicola, C. Veturius Crassus Cicurinus, Ser. Sulpicius Rufus or: Ser. Sulpicius Praetextatus, L. Quinctius Cincinnatus, C. Quinctius Cincinnatus
- 376 – Consular Tribunes: L. Papirius Mugillanus, Licinus Menenius Lanatus, Ser. Cornelius Maluginensis, Ser. Sulpicius Praetextatus

- 375–371: Elections vetoed by plebeian tribunes.
- 370 – Consular Tribunes: A. Manlius Capitolinus, L. Furius Medullinus, Ser. Sulpicius Praetextatus, Ser. Cornelius Maluginensis, C. Valerius Potitus Volusus, P. Valerius Potitus Poplicola
- 369 – Consular Tribunes: Q. Servilius Fidenas, C. Veturius Crassus Cicurinus, A. Cornelius Cossus, M. Cornelius Maluginensis, Q. Quinctius Cincinnatus, M. Fabius Ambustus
- 368 – Consular Tribunes: Ser. Cornelius Maluginensis, Ser. Sulpicius Praetextatus, Sp. Servilius Structus, T. Quinctius Cincinnatus Capitolinus, L. Papirius Crassus, L. Veturius Crassus Cicurinus
- 367 – Consular Tribunes: A. Cornelius Cossus, M. Cornelius Maluginensis, M. Geganius Macerinus, P. Manlius Capitolinus, L. Veturius Crassus Cicurinus, P. Valerius Potitus Poplicola
- 366

- L. Aemilius Mamercinus, Consul
- L. Sextius Sextinus Lateranus, Consul

- 365

- L. Genucius Aventinensis, Consul
- Q. Servilius Ahala, Consul

- 364

- C. Sulpicius Peticus, Consul
- C. Licinius Calvus, Consul

- 363

- Cn. Genucius Aventinensis, Consul
- L. Aemilius Mamercinus, Consul

- 362

- Q. Servilius Ahala, Consul
- L. Genucius Aventinensis, Consul

- 361

- C. Licinius Stolo, Consul
- C. Sulpicius Peticus, Consul

- 360

- M. Fabius Ambustus, Consul
- C. Poetelius Libo Visolus, Consul

- 359

- M. Popillius Laenas, Consul
- Cn. Manlius Capitolinus Imperiosus, Consul

- 358

- C. Fabius Ambustus, Consul
- C. Plautius Proculus, Consul

- 357

- C. Marcius Rutilus, Consul
- Cn. Manlius Capitolinus Imperiosus, Consul

- 356

- M. Fabius Ambustus II, Consul
- M. Popillius Laenas, Consul

- 355

- C. Sulpicius Peticus, Consul
- M. Valerius Poplicola, Consul

- 354

- M. Fabius Ambustus III, Consul
- T. Quinctius Pennus Capitolinus Crispinus, Consul
- ? M. Popillius Laenas, Consul

- 353

- C. Sulpicius Peticus, Consul
- M. Valerius Poplicola, Consul

- 352

- P. Valerius Poplicola, Consul
- C. Marcius Rutilus, Consul

- 351

- C. Sulpicius Peticus, Consul
- T. Quinctius Pennus Capitolinus Crispinus, Consul

- 350

- M. Popillius Laenas, Consul
- L. Cornelius Scipio, Consul

- 349

- L. Furius Camillus, Consul
- Ap. Claudius Crassus Inregillensis, Consul
- ? M. Aemilius, Consul
- ? T. Quinctius, Consul

- 348

- M. Valerius Corvus, Consul
- M. Popillius Laenas, Consul

- 347

- C. Plautius Venno (or Venox), Consul
- T. Manlius Imperiosus Torquatus, Consul

- 346

- M. Valerius Corvus, Consul
- C. Poetelius Libo Visolus, Consul

- 345

- M. Fabius Dorsuo, Consul
- Ser. Sulpicius Camerinus Rufus, Consul

- 344

- C. Marcius Rutilus, Consul
- T. Manlius Imperiosus Torquatus, Consul

- 343

- M. Valerius Corvus, Consul
- A. Cornelius Cossus Arvina, Consul

- 342

- Q. Servilius Ahala, Consul
- C. Marcius Rutilus, Consul

- 341

- C. Plautius Venno (or Venox), Consul
- L. Aemilius Mamercinus Privernas, Consul

- 340

- T. Manlius Imperiosus Torquatus, Consul
- P. Decius Mus, Consul

- 339

- Ti. Aemilius Mamercinus, Consul
- Q. Publilius Philo, Consul

- 338

- L. Furius Camillus, Consul
- C. Maenius, Consul

- 337

- C. Sulpicius Longus, Consul
- P. Aelius Paetus, Consul

- 336

- L. Papirius Crassus, Consul
- K. Duillius, Consul

- 335

- M. Atilius Regulus Calenus, Consul
- M. Valerius Corvus, Consul

- 334

- Sp. Postumius Albinus Caudinus, Consul
- T. Veturius Calvinus, Consul

- 333
- Publius Cornelius Rufinus, Dictator (333 BC)
- 332

- Cn. Domitius Calvinus, Consul
- A. Cornelius Cossus Arvina, Consul

- 331

- C. Valerius Potitus, Consul
- M. Claudius Marcellus, Consul

- 330

- L. Papirius Crassus, Consul
- L. Plautius Venno (or Venox), Consul

- 329

- L. Aemilius Mamercinus Privernas, Consul
- C. Plautius Decianus, Consul

- 328

- P. Plautius Proculus or C. Plautius Decianus II, Consul
- P. Cornelius Scapula or P. Cornelius Scipio Barbatus, Consul

- 327

- L. Cornelius Lentulus, Consul
- Q. Publilius Philo, Consul

- 326

- C. Poetelius Libo Visolus, Consul
- L. Papirius Cursor, Consul

- 325

- L. Furius Camillus, Consul
- D. Junius Brutus Scaeva, Consul

- 324
- Lucius Papirius Cursor, Dictator (325–324 BC)
- 323

- C. Sulpicius Longus, Consul
- Q. Aulius Cerretanus, Consul

- 322

- Q. Fabius Maximus Rullianus, Consul
- L. Fulvius Curvus, Consul

- 321

- T. Veturius Calvinus, Consul
- Sp. Postumius Albinus Caudinus, Consul

- 320

- L. Papirius Cursor, Consul
- Q. Publilius Philo, Consul

- 319

- L. Papirius Cursor, Consul
- Q. Aulius Cerretanus, Consul

- 318

- M. Folius Flaccinator, Consul
- L. Plautius Venno (or Venox), Consul

- 317

- C. Junius Bubulcus Brutus, Consul
- Q. Aemilius Barbula, Consul

- 316

- Sp. Nautius Rutilus, Consul
- M. Popillius Laenas, Consul

- 315

- L. Papirius Cursor, Consul
- Q. Publilius Philo, Consul

- 314

- M. Poetelius Libo, Consul
- C. Sulpicius Longus, Consul

- 313

- L. Papirius Cursor, Consul
- C. Junius Bubulcus Brutus, Consul

- 312

- M. Valerius Maximus Corvus, Consul
- P. Decius Mus, Consul

- 311

- C. Junius Bubulcus Brutus, Consul
- Q. Aemilius Barbula II, Consul

- 310

- Q. Fabius Maximus Rullianus, Consul
- C. Marcius Rutilus Censorinus, Consul

- 309
- L. Papirius Cursor, Dictator (310–309 BC)
- 308

- P. Decius Mus, Consul
- Q. Fabius Maximus Rullianus, Consul

- 307

- Ap. Claudius Caecus, Consul
- L. Volumnius Flamma Violens, Consul

- 306

- Q. Marcius Tremulus, Consul
- P. Cornelius Arvina, Consul

- 305

- L. Postumius Megellus, Consul
- Ti. Minucius Augurinus, Consul
- M. Fulvius Curvus Paetinus, Consul suffectus

- 304

- P. Sempronius Sophus, Consul
- P. Sulpicius Saverrio, Consul

- 303

- Ser. Cornelius Lentulus, Consul
- L. Genucius Aventinensis, Consul

- 302

- M. Livius Denter, Consul
- M. Aemilius Paullus, Consul

- 301
- Marcus Valerius Corvus, Dictator (302, 301 BC)

- Syracuse (complete list) –

- Dionysius the Elder, Tyrant (405–367 BC)
- Dionysius the Younger, Tyrant (367–356 BC, 346–344 BC)
- Dion, Tyrant (357–355 BC)
- Calippus, Tyrant (355–353 BC)
- Hipparinus, Tyrant (353–c.350 BC)
- Nysaeus, Tyrant (c.350–346 BC)
- Timoleon, General, oligarch (345–337 BC)
- Agathocles, Tyrant (317–289 BC)

=== Eurasia: Caucasus ===
- Kingdom of Armenia (complete list) –

- Orontes I, Satrap (401–344 BC)
- Darius III, Satrap (c.344–336 BC)
- Orontes II, Satrap (336–331 BC)
- Mithrenes, Satrap (331–323 BC)
- Neoptolemus, Satrap (323–321 BC)
- Mithrenes, King (321–317 BC)
- Orontes III, King (317–260 BC)
