= Aventinensis =

Aventinensis is a cognomen of ancient Rome, a branch of the Genucia gens. This was a plebeian family, the name being derived from the Aventine Hill, which was the quarter of Rome peculiar to the plebeians.

Notable people with this cognomen include:

- Lucius Genucius Aventinensis, Roman consul
- Lucius Genucius (Aventinensis), author of the Leges Genuciae
- Gnaeus Genucius Aventinensis, consul in 363 BCE
- Lucius Genucius Aventinensis (consul 303 BC), Roman consul
