= Lucius Sextius Lateranus =

4th-century BC Roman tribune of the plebs

Lucius Sextius Sextinus Lateranus was a Roman tribune of the plebs and is noted for having been one of two men (the other being Gaius Licinius Stolo) who passed the Leges Liciniae Sextiae of 368 BC and 367 BC. Originally, these were a set of three laws. One law provided that the interest already paid on debts should be deducted from the principal and that the payment of the rest of the principal should be in three equal annual installments. Another one provided restricted individual ownership of public land in excess of 500 iugeras (300 acres) and forbade the grazing of more than 100 cattle on public land. The most important law provided that one of the two consuls be a plebeian. Having been reelected nine times, Lucius Sextius Lateranus and Gaius Licinius Stolo held the plebeian tribunate for ten years. In 368 BC the laws regarding debt and land were passed, but the law regarding the consulship was rejected. In 367 BC this law was passed. In the same year the two tribunes of the plebs proposed a fourth law concerning the priests who were the custodians of the sacred Sibylline Books, and Lucius Sextius Lateranus was elected to serve as consul for the year 366 BC. Livy wrote that he was "the first of the plebeians to attain that honour."

== The ten years as tribune of the plebs ==
Lucius Sextius and Gaius Licinius proposed these laws in 375 BC when they were elected tribunes of the plebs. They were opposed by the patricians, who prevented the bills from being debated. In retaliation the two men vetoed the election of the military tribunes with consular power (consular tribunes) for five years. They were reelected to the plebeian tribunate each year for nine consecutive years. In 370 BC they allowed the election of the consular tribunes because there was a need to raise an army to fight against the city of Velitrae. In 369 BC, the laws, particularly the one concerning the consulship, were fiercely debated. In 368 BC Marcus Furius Camillus, who opposed the enactment of the bills, was appointed dictator. However, he resigned for unclear reasons. The Plebeian Council passed the laws on interest and on land, but rejected the law about the consulship. However, the two tribunes of the plebs pressed for all the motions to be put to the plebeians collectively and vowed not to stand for re-election if this was not done, arguing that there was reason to reelect them only if the plebeians wanted to enact the measures they proposed together. In 367 BC Lucius Sextius and Gaius Licinius were returned to their office for the tenth time, and the law on the consulship was passed. The two men proposed a law which abolished the Duumviri Sacris Faciundis, a college of two priests, who were patricians, and also the custodians of the sacred Sibylline Books, and replaced it with the Decemviri sacris faciundis, a college of ten priests with the same role. Five of them were to be patricians and five were to be plebeians. The law was passed, and five patrician priests and five plebeian ones were duly elected. According to Livy, "Satisfied with their victory, the plebs gave way to the patricians, and relinquishing for the moment discussion about the consuls, permitted the election of military tribunes [with consular power]."

Still in 367 BC, Marcus Furius Camillus was appointed dictator because of an attack by the Gauls of northern Italy. According to Livy, on his return to Rome after defeating the Gauls, Camillus "was confronted with a fiercer opposition in the City. After desperate struggles the senate and the dictator were beaten, and the measures advocated by the tribunes were adopted. An election of consuls was held, against the wishes of the nobles ..." Lucius Sextius Lateranus was elected as one of the two consuls. The patrician senators declared that they would not ratify the election. The bitter dispute almost led to another plebeian secession. Camillus struck a compromise: in exchange for the patricians acknowledging the election of Lucius Sextius, the plebeians made the concession that the patricians might elect from the patricians one praetor to administer justice in the City. In that year the office of the curule aediles was also created.

Little is known about the consulship of Lucius Sextius Lateranus. Livy only wrote that in the year of his consulship one praetor and two curule aediles from the patrician ranks were elected. There were rumours about a gathering of Gallic soldiers and a defection by the Hernici, who were Roman allies. The patrician senators decided to defer any action so as not to give the plebeian consul a military task. The plebeians were unhappy that these three new patrician magistrates had been installed. According to Livy, in response to this, "it was arranged to take the curule aediles from the plebs in alternate years: later the election was thrown open without distinction".

== Modern evaluation of the law regarding the consulship ==
Some modern historians have pointed out that there is lack of clarity regarding the law which provided that one consul should be a plebeian. Livy saw this law as a breakthrough in the political advancement of the plebeians. T.J. Cornell notes that, according to Livy and his sources, the regular and unbroken sharing of the consulship stemmed from the Leges Genuciae proposed by the plebeian tribune Lucius Genucius in 342 BC which, it is claimed, allowed plebeians to hold both consulships. However, the Fasti consulares (a chronicle of yearly events in which the years are denoted by their consuls) suggest that this law made it obligatory for one consulship to be held by a plebeian. Cornell suggests that it might be that it was the Lex Genucia which truly introduced power-sharing between patricians and plebeians (by providing that there should be one consul from each social order) and that the Lex Licinia Sextia may simply have been an administrative adjustment which transferred plebeian access to the highest office from the military tribunes with consular power to the consulship and, thus, Lucius Sextius becoming the first plebeian consul "becomes rather less impressive." K. von Fritz and Sordi also think that the law on the consuls and the praetors was an administrative reform.

Livy wrote that in the military tribunes with consular power were instituted in 444 BC because it was decided that in some years the consulship should be replaced by the consular tribunes (whose numbers varied from three to six), that this office would be open to plebeians and that it had been created as a concession to the plebeians who wanted access to the consulship. However, from 444 BC to 401 BC, only two such tribunes, out of a total of 100, were plebeians. For the 400-376 BC period, only in 400, 399 and 396 BC were the majority of these tribunes plebeians (4, 5, and 5 out of 6) and in 379 BC there were three plebeians of six. For Cornell, this raises some questions: Why from 444 to 401 BC were there only two plebeians? Why, given the presence of plebeians in the subsequent period, which shows their eligibility to the highest office, was plebeian access to the consulship considered such a landmark for the political promotion of the plebeians? Why was there such resistance to this? The sources seem to see the law as a breakthrough not just because it provided access to the consulship, but it required that one of the two consuls of the year be a patrician. However, for a twelve-year period after passage of the law, from 355 to 343 BC, both consuls were patricians and the consulship became an unbroken line of shared office only after that.

== Biographical facts ==
=== Basic data ===
- Full Name: Lucius Sextius Sextus (filius) N. (nepos) Sextinus Lateranus

=== Offices held ===
- Tribune of the plebs 375 BC – 367 BC
- Consul 366 BC (co-consul to Lucius Aemilius Mamercinus)

=== Notable actions ===
- Responsible, with Gaius Licinius, for the Lex Licinia Sextia in 367 BC
- Became first of the new yearly required plebeian consuls in 366 BC

== See also ==
- Sextia gens
- Lex Licinia-Sextia

Political offices
Preceded by consular tribunes	Roman consul 366 BC with Lucius Aemilius Mamercinus	Succeeded by Lucius Genucius Aventinensis; Quintus Servilius Ahala
