= Argos Theater =

Ancient Greek theatre in Argos, Greece

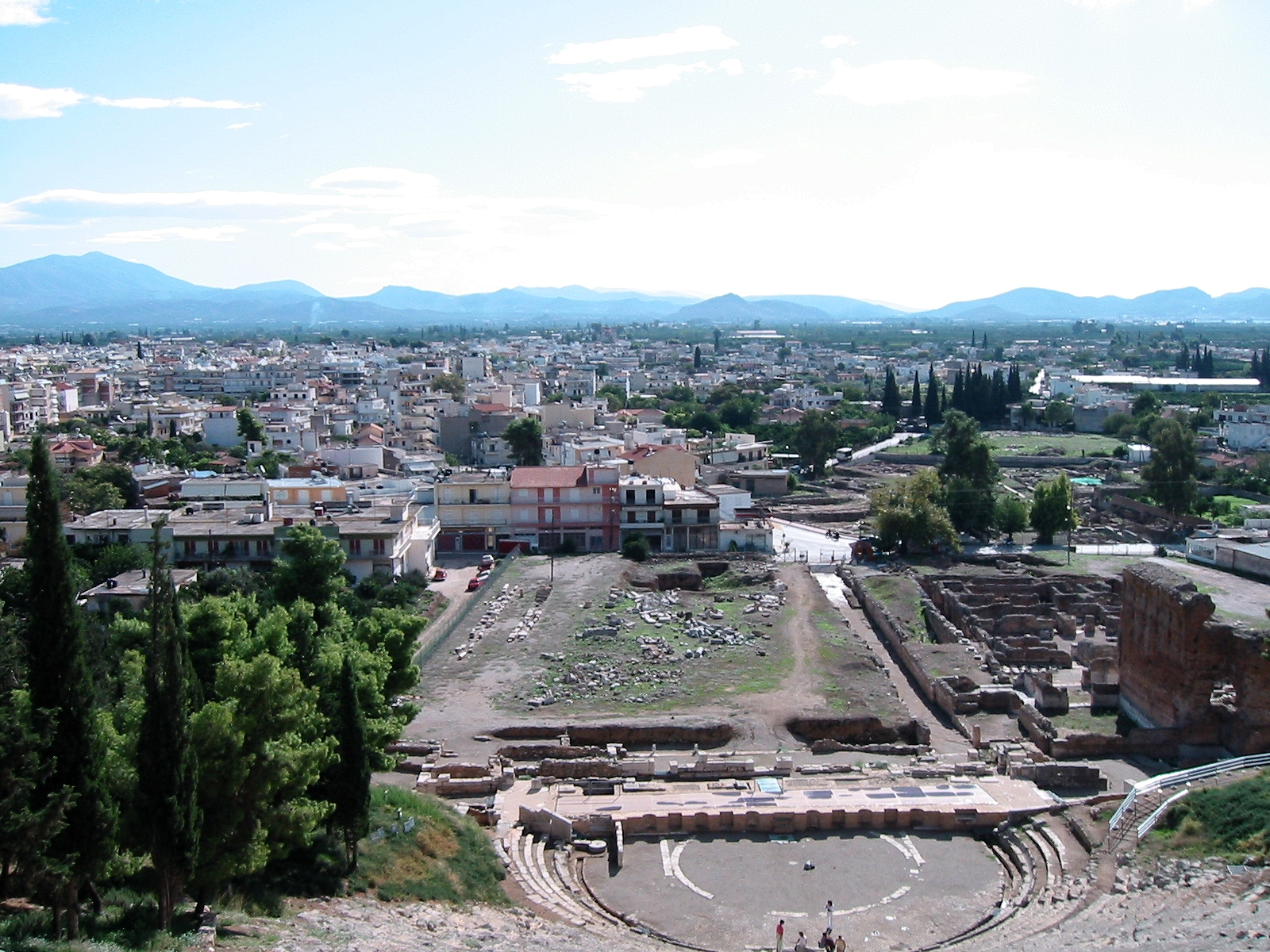
View from the top of the Argos Theater on the Cavea

The Argos Theater was built in 320 BC. and is located in Argos, Greece against Larissa Hill. Nearby from this site is Agora, Roman Odeon, and the Baths of Argos. The theater is one of the largest architectural developments in Greece and was renovated in ca 120 AD.

== Overview of the site ==
The Hellenistic theater at Argos is cut into the hillside of the Larisa, with 90 steps up a steep incline, forming a narrow rectilinear cavea. Among the largest theaters in Greece, it held about 20,000 spectators and is divided by two landings into three horizontal sections. Staircases further divide the cavea into four cunei, corresponding to the tribes of Argos.(Psychogiou) British archaeologist Richard Allan Tomlinson describes the positions of the steps as not conforming to any regular plan, and the blocks are consequently of varying sizes. A high wall was erected to prevent unauthorized access into the theatron and may have helped the acoustics, but it is said the sound quality is still very good today.

Around 120 CE, both theaters were renovated in the Roman style. It was around this time that the smaller of the theaters was converted to an odeon, and the Hellenistic theater became Greco-Roman. Containing one of only two examples of a circular orchestra, the other is at Epidauros. The Romans constructed a proskenion that covered part of the orchestra with a hyposkenion below it. The cavea doesn't show evidence of renovation so it can be assumed that they remain original. (Lavy)

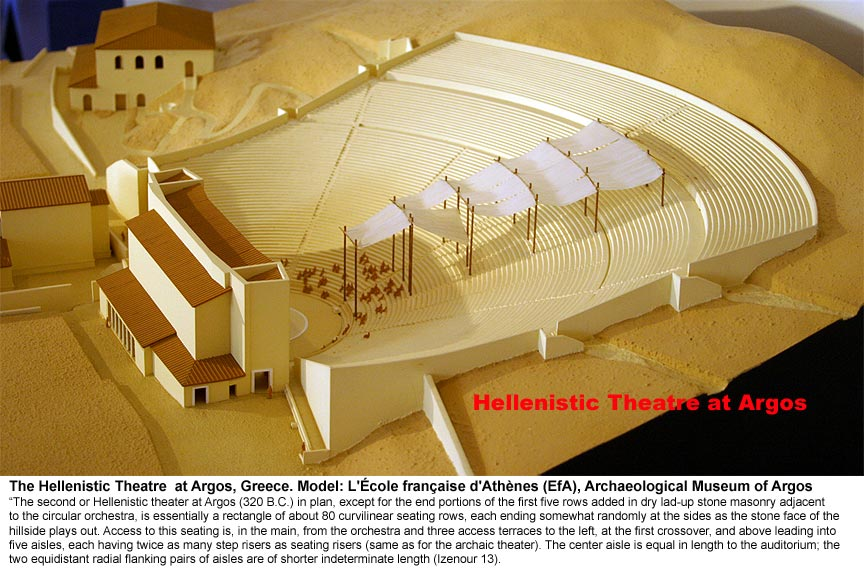
Model representation of the Argos Theater

Another notable feature is the Charonian stairway. Actually more like a tunnel, the stairway lead underground from the backstage to the orchestra pit and is presumed to be used to "sudden appear" among the actors in play. Other reports suggest these tunnels were too short and narrow to operate effectively for actors, especially actors in costume. In 1988, archaeologists revealed a full circle orchestra bounded by stone like the theater of Epidauros. "Argos and Epidauros are the only two theaters proven to have this orchestral feature.

== Architectural characteristics ==
The Argos theater reflects on the same template other Greek theaters follow. The paradoi is the entrance that directs actors onto the stage or to the orchestra for the chorus. The scaenae frons is the backdrop of the theater. The Argos Theater was composed on a hillside giving a view of the Caicus River behind the performers.

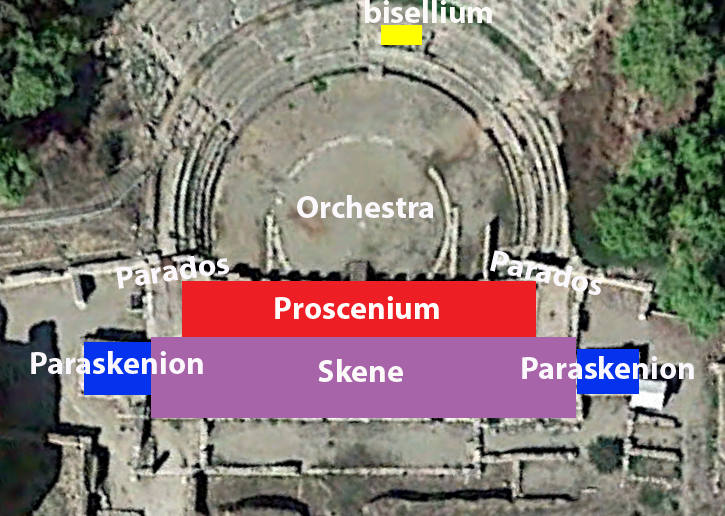
Argos Theater Layout

The proscenium in the main stage made entirely out of bricks and is supported by columns. Behind the proscenium is the skene (theatre) which is where the behind the scenes productions occur. Opposed to other theaters, the Argos Theater skene is not the most luxurious. A tent was used for the space instead, and was assembled when needed. The theater features a bisellium, a seated area designed to occupy honorary leaders.

== Cultural impact ==
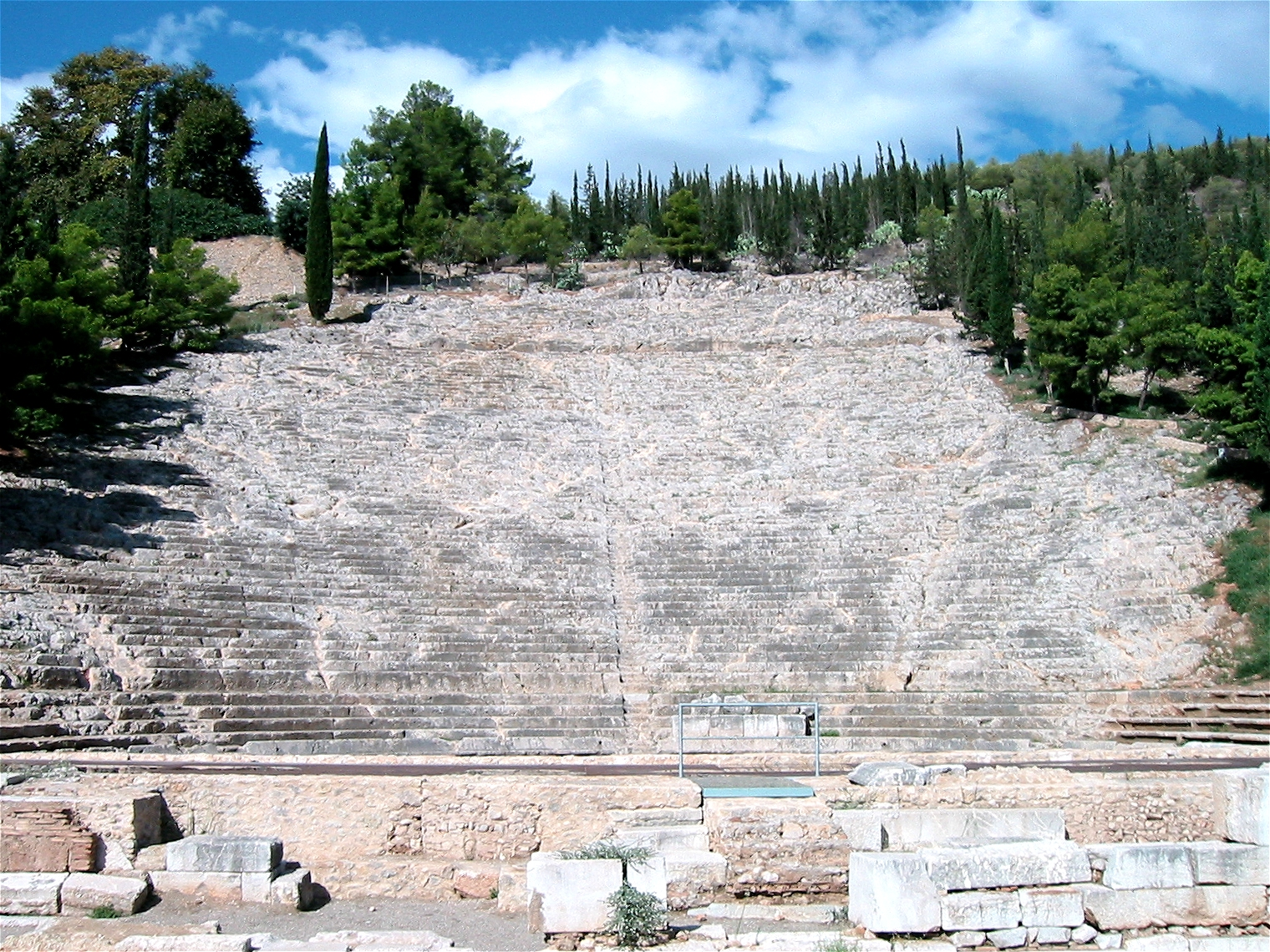
Hellenistic Theater of Argos

Considered one of the largest ancient Greek theaters, the theater at Argos has a very long history. Evolving from a small archaic theater, at the base of a rocky slope in the ancient city's agora, to a monumental theater holding 20,000 spectators arranged on 83 rows; a pride of Hadrian. It is possible that this theater, and the Roman Odeon, were known by Aeschylus, Sophocles, Euripides, and Aristophanes. With the Nafplio bay to the south, and the city of Argos as a backdrop, this theater has provided enormous insight on architectural theater developments. The mythological history of the city became a high interest for people to travel to visit Argos.

== Purpose ==
There is a theory the Argos Theater was developed to hold important and exclusive gatherings. However, it resulted to becoming a universal site to host festivals, meetings, and athletic competitions.

=== Nemean Games ===
The Nemean Games is part of the Panhellenic Games collective and it were held every two years and was the catalyst for the development of the Argos Theater. During the classical antiquity era, the Nemean games were held at the Sanctuary of Zeus until a portion of the site was demolished the games had to relocate itself. In 270 BCE, during the Hellenistic period the games migrated to Argos and remained there. The Nemean games became the most remembered and established games out of the four others.

The participants of these games were wealthy men, and they competed in the games to test their dexterity and endurance. Greek men were known to be competitive and prideful people and were always up for a challenge to prove who is the strongest and fastest. These events were known to be the influence for the Olympic games. During the c. 3 BC these events transferred from the city of Nemean over to the city of Argos. Eventually these games were held at the Argos Theater as the primary venue. Competitions and gladiator combats were performed as well for men to demonstrate their athletic abilities. A pool was developed into the theater to be able to host aquatic games. Greeks were innovative and created many way to show themselves off.

=== Music and drama ===
The first documented musical performance occurred in c. 700 BCE. The theater was used as a site to display different types of art forms, such as music and acting. In some cases, music and drama performances were held during sporting events and festivals. Greeks were competitive people, so they turned these performances into competitions. Music and drama contests were popular because it allowed citizens to prove who is the most talented amongst them all. The music competitions were typically held during the Nemean games, and would feature musicians or singers for a change of entertainment. Festivals were held at the theater and featured musical and drama performances. The purpose of the festivals was to bring citizens together at the Argos Theater to celebrate Greek life and to worship their Gods.

=== Political assembly ===
The theatre also held political gatherings, which is known as Ecclesia. This is a Greek assembly where men are able to emote their ideas to influence each other's political opinions and decisions. The Assembly wanted to give people the opportunity to speak their mind, so freedom of speech was vital for the group of participants. Deciding through the democratic system, the assembly would tackle issues such as war, ways to manage their military, or to elect someone as an official political figure. There are standards to attend the assembly events in the Argos Theater. To become a member of the assembly, men must be at the age of 18, and have served in the military for a minimum of two years. The assembly kept themselves to be exclusive amongst other citizens.

== Roman restoration ==
Emperor Hadrian is a key figure in the rebuilding of the city of Argos. Emperor Hadrian documented the construction of the theater from the 2nd century BC to the 1st century AD. There is evidence that the Argos Theater required adding, subtracting, and manipulation from what was left. Floor levels shifted in elevation and new buildings were constructed on the east side of the theater. The entrance was believed to have five steps, but when the theater was discovered it had six steps. The reconstruction of the Argos Theater was an opportunity for the Greeks to improve the theater's original design. During the development of the Baths of Argos, the stairs that were once there were adapted into a ramp leading into the theater. These additions and adjustments are concrete evidence of the reconstruction of the Argos Theater.

== Discovery ==
The city of Argos was set on fire during the Greek Revolution against the Ottoman Empire. The French School of Archaeology excavated the Argos Theater and discovered many artifacts including pottery, terracotta figures, Greek and Roman sculpture (including rare surviving works of Attalus), mosaic, and armor. The school have been researching and seeking for more artifacts for over 100 years. With an excavation that began in 1892, two theaters were unearthed about 100 meters from Argos, in the city's ancient agora. Initially, the smaller of the two theaters was found and dated to the 3rd of 4th century BC.This archaic theater was later converted into an Odeon (building); when population demand required a bigger theater. A larger Hellenistic theater, dated to the late 4th century (Tomlinson), was found just to the North and excavated. These sites are believed to have been buried for 1,400 years before being discovered.

== Notes ==
- Ashby, Clifford. Classical Greek Theatre: New Views of an Old Subject. Iowa City: U of Iowa P, 1999
- Izenour, George C. Theater Design. 2nd ed. New Haven: Yale UP, 1996.
- Tomlinson, R.A. Argos and the Argolid: From the End of the Bronze Age to the Roman Occupation. Ithaca NY: Cornell UP, 1972
- The Princeton Encyclopedia of Classical Sites (Eds. Richard Stillwell, William L. MacDonald, Marian Holland McAllister)
- Levy, Jennifer The Ancient Theater Archive:The theatre and odion at Argos. University of Washington 2003
- Psychogiou, Olga Odysseus: Ancient Theatre of Argos. Ministry of sport and Culture 2012
- Cartwright, Mark. "Ancient Argos", World History Encyclopedia. Last modified May 14, 2012.
