= Subsellium =

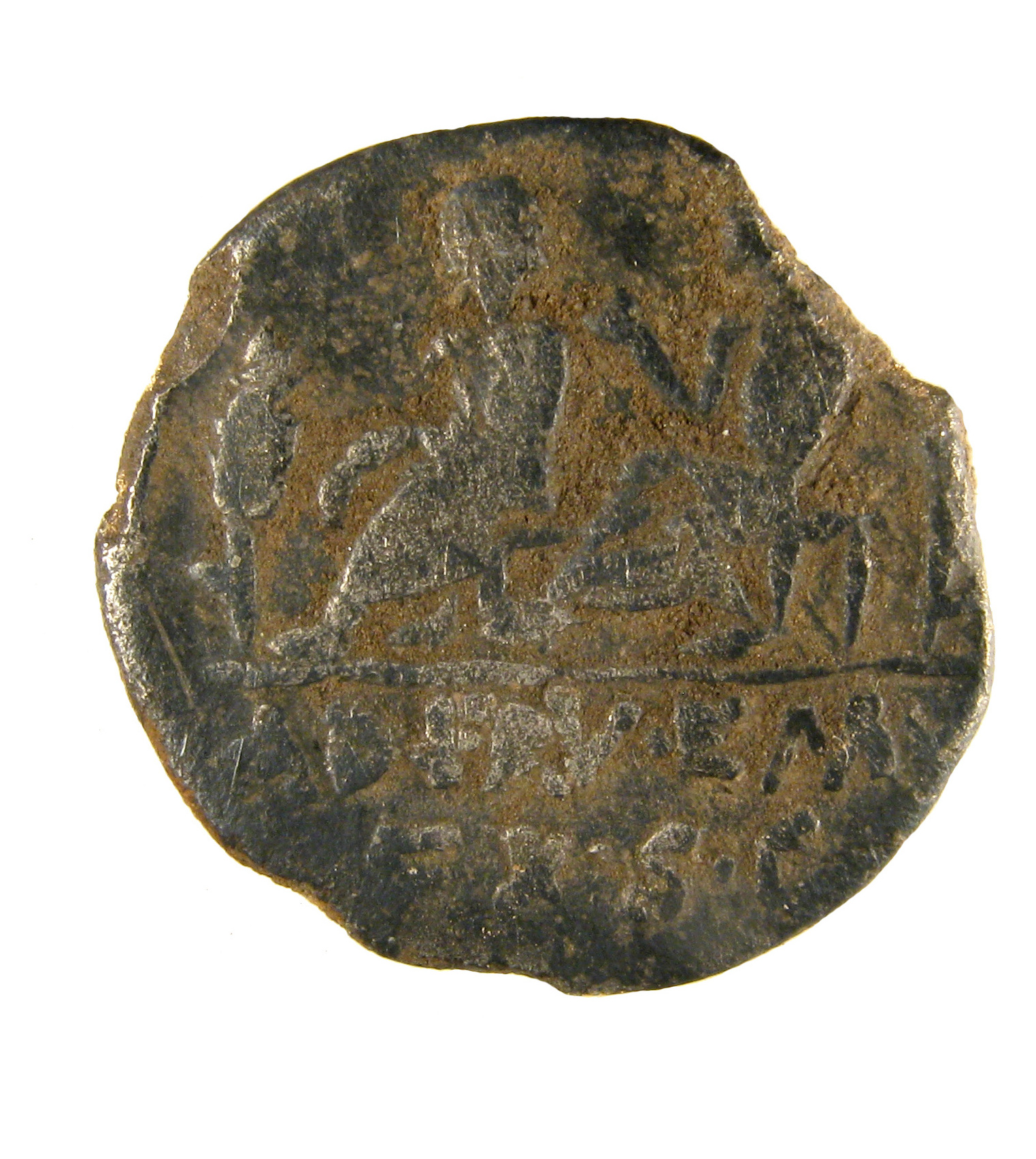
Two quaestors sitting on the subsellium (image on a Roman denarius)

In Ancient Rome, the subsellium (a "low bench") was a bench (Latin: scamnum) or sometimes a seat of another kind. The word was used to describe seating arranged for groups of people in Roman theaters, senators' seats in the curia, seats for tribunes of the plebs (subsellia). The latter meaning of a "judge's seat" transferred to mean the court or tribunal and is replicated in the modern en banc (from Law French "in bench" designating the central royal court at Westminster).

In the medieval churches the term was used for the misericord, a wooden ledge on the underside of a choir stall seat. When the hinged seat was put upright, the subsellium provided a modicum of support for the occupant who was otherwise supposed to be standing (thus the "mercy-seat" designation).

== Construction ==
The subsellium was a common, backless bench widespread in the Roman world. Contemporary sources mention its use in private homes, theaters, the senate house, law courts, and schools. Although no definite examples survive, literary accounts strongly suggest that the subsellium was made of wood. Suetonius alone provides several examples:

- benches from the senate and courts were broken into pieces to create a funeral pyre for Julius Caesar;
- a heavy man caused a theater bench to collapse under his weight;
- during a brawl, combatants fought each other with pieces of broken subsellium.

In theaters, the term was also applied to masonry seats.

=== Similar benches ===
Scamnum was a similar, smaller piece of furniture used as both a bench and a footstool (per Varro, it was higher than yet another stool, scabellum, and could be used to get into a high bed). In the late Roman period, subsellium and scamnum apparently became interchangeable, with scamnum being the more pedestrian term ("subsellia, or, as the common man says, scamna").

=== Herculaneum ===
Three pieces of furniture found at Herculaneum might be examples of subsellia (or scamnum). These rectangular benches are between 1.05 and 1.40 meters long and stand 36 to 39 cm high. Due to the artifacts' deterioration and attempts at restoration, many details are unclear, including the number of legs (four separate legs or two slab legs) and their attachment to the seat. For comfort, the seats were slightly concave with rounded front edges. The front part of legs featured a carved, S-shaped curve resembling a stylized animal leg.

== Sources ==
- Hartnett, Jeremy (2017). The Roman Street: Urban Life and Society in Pompeii, Herculaneum, and Rome. Cambridge University Press. doi:10.1017/9781316226438. ISBN 9781316226438.
- Curl, James Stevens (2022-10-03). "Select Glossary". English Victorian Churches: Architecture, Faith, and Revival. Boydell and Brewer Limited. pp. 187–208. doi:10.1017/9781739822941.013. ISBN 978-1-7398229-4-1.
- Sanders, Anthony B.; Liles, Matt (2023). "En Banc or In Bank? Take a Seat..." (PDF). Judicature. 107 (2). Bolch Judicial Institute at Duke University School of Law: 34–39.
- Ulrich, Roger Bradley (2007). Roman Woodworking. New Haven (Conn.) London: Yale University Press. ISBN 978-0-300-10341-0.
