= Gaius Licinius =

Gaius Licinius may refer to:

- Gaius Licinius Stolo, early tribune and consul responsible for land laws
- Gaius Licinius Macer, late statesman and annalist
- Gaius Licinius Mucianus, general of Vespasian
