= Gnaeus Genucius Aventinensis =

4th-century BCE Roman consul

Gnaeus Genucius Aventinensis, M. f. M. n. (or "Gnaeus Genucius Aventinensis, son of Marcus, grandson of Marcus", see Roman filiation), was a nobleman of ancient Rome of the Genucia gens. He served as consul in 363 BCE, in which year the senate was chiefly occupied in endeavoring to appease the anger of the gods, owing to the severe pestilence and flooding that Rome was suffering. To this end, Lucius Manlius Capitolinus Imperiosus was nominated to the office of dictator to perform the rite of clavum fingere to mollify the angry gods.

He and his family are notable in being among the very few plebeians to ever hold the office of consul.

He was the brother of the Lucius Genucius Aventinensis who was consul in 365 BCE, and may have been the father or grandfather of the Lucius Genucius Aventinensis who was consul in 303 BCE.

Political offices
| Preceded by Gaius Sulpicius Peticus and Gaius Licinius Calvus | Consul of the Roman Republic; 363 BC with Lucius Aemilius Mamercinus | Succeeded by Quintus Servilius Ahala and Lucius Genucius Aventinensis |
