= Servius Sulpicius Praetextatus =

4th-century BC Roman senator and consul

Servius Sulpicius Praetextatus was a Roman aristocrat of the Roman Republic who served four times as consular tribune, in 377 BC, 376, 370, and 368. He married the elder daughter of Marcus Fabius Ambustus. An anecdote frequently told said that his wife's sister, the younger daughter of Fabius, who was married to the plebeian Gaius Licinius Stolo, urged on her husband to procure the consulship for plebeians through the Lex Licinia Sextia, as she was jealous of the honors of her sister's husband. As early as the turn of the 19th century, the German historian Barthold Georg Niebuhr pointed out the historical untrustworthiness and contradictions in this tale.

Political offices
Preceded by Spirus Furius Medullinus, Quintus Servillius Fidenas II, Licinus Menenius Lanatus III, Publius Cloelius Siculus, Marcus Horatius Pulvillus, and Lucius Geganius Macerinus	Consular Tribune of the Roman Republic; 377 BC with Lucius Aemilius Mamercinus, P. Valerius Potitus Poplicola IV, Gaius Veturius Crassus Cicurinus, Lucius Quinctius Cincinnatus III, and Gaius Quinctius Cincinnatus	Succeeded by Lucius Papirius Mugillanus III, Licinus Menenius Lanatus IV and Servius Cornelius Maluginensis V
Preceded by Lucius Aemilius Mamercinus, Publius Valerius Potitus Poplicola IV, Gaius Veturius Crassus Cicurinus, Lucius Quinctius Cincinnatus III, and Gaius Quinctius Cincinnatus	Consular Tribune of the Roman Republic; 376 BC with Lucius Papirius Mugillanus III, Licinus Menenius Lanatus IV and Servius Cornelius Maluginensis V	Succeeded by vacatio
Preceded by vacatio	Consular Tribune of the Roman Republic; 370 BC with Aulus Manlius Capitolinus, Lucius Furius Medullinus II, Sergius Cornelius Maluginensis VI, Gaius Valerius Potitus Volusus, and Publius Valerius Potitus Poplicola V	Succeeded by Quintus Servilius Fidenas III, Gaius Veturius Crassus Cicurinus II, Aulus Cornelius Cossus, Marcus Cornelius Maluginensis, Quintus Quinctius Cincinnatus, and Marcus Fabius Ambustus II
Preceded by Quintus Servilius Fidenas III, Gaius Veturius Crassus Cicurinus II, Aulus Cornelius Cossus, Marcus Cornelius Maluginensis, Quintus Quinctius Cincinnatus, and Marcus Fabius Ambustus II	Consular Tribune of the Roman Republic; 368 BC with Ser. Cornelius Maluginensis VII, Spirus Servilius Structus, Titus Quinctius Cincinnatus Capitolinus, Lucius Papirius Crassus, and Lucius Veturius Crassus Cicurinus	Succeeded by A. Cornelius Cossus II, Marcus Cornelius Maluginensis II, Marcus Geganius Macerinus, Publius Manlius Capitolinus II, Lucius Veturius Crassus Cicurinus II, and Publius Valerius Potitus Poplicola VI
