= Licinio-Sextian rogations =

Ancient Roman laws

The Licinio-Sextian rogations were a series of laws proposed by tribunes of the plebs, Gaius Licinius Stolo and Lucius Sextius Lateranus, enacted around 367 BC. Livy calls them rogatio – though he does refer to them at times as lex – as the plebeian assembly at the time did not have the power to enact leges (laws).

These laws provided for a limit on the interest rate of loans and a restriction on private ownership of land. A third law, which provided for one of the two consuls to be a plebeian, was rejected. Two of these laws were passed in 368 BC, after the two proponents had been elected and re-elected tribunes for nine consecutive years and had successfully prevented the election of patrician magistrates for five years (375–370 BC). In 367 BC, during their tenth tribunate, this law was passed. In the same year, they also proposed a fourth law regarding the priests who were the custodians of the sacred Sibylline Books.

These and related laws (such as the Leges Genuciae) and the long struggle to pass them were part of the two hundred year conflict of the orders between the patrician aristocracy and the plebeians, who were most of the Roman populace. The conflict was one of the major influences on the internal politics of Rome during the first two centuries of the Roman Republic.

== Background ==
According to Livy, Gaius Licinius and Lucius Sextius proposed three bills before the Plebeian Council (the assembly of the plebeians) in 375 BC. Two of them concerned land and debt (which were two issues which greatly affected the plebeians) and the third concerned the termination of the military tribunes with consular power (often referred to as consular tribunes), who had periodically replaced the consuls as the heads of the Republic (444, 438, 434–32, 426–24, 422, 420–14, 408–394 and 391–76 BC), the restoration of consuls and the admission of plebeians to the consulship by providing that one of the two consuls was to be a plebeian. The latter proposal created fierce opposition by the patricians, who held vast political power by monopolising the consulship and the seats of the senate, thinking that, as aristocrats, this was their sole prerogative, and abhorred the idea of sharing power with the plebeians. They persuaded other plebeian tribunes to veto voting on this bill. In retaliation, Gaius Licinius and Lucius Sextius vetoed the election of the consular tribunes for five years, until 370 BC, when they relented because the Volscian town of Velitrae had attacked the territory of Rome and one of her allies. The election of consular tribunes resumed. With the soldiers engaged in the siege of Velitrae, the voting on the bills had to be postponed. Gaius Licinius and Lucius Sextius proposed a fourth bill regarding the sacred Sibylline Books.

In 368 BC the Roman troops came back from Velitrae. As the controversy dragged and given that with the return of the troops voting could be carried out, the patrician senate appointed Marcus Furius Camillus as dictator (a head of state with extraordinary powers appointed for a term of six months at times of crisis), who strongly opposed the bills and threatened the use of violence. However, he had to resign for unclear reasons. The plebeian tribunes put the bills to the vote of the Plebeian Council (the assembly of the plebeians). The bills on land and debt were passed, but the one on plebeian consuls was rejected. Livy wrote that "both the former [bills] would probably have been carried into law if [Gaius Licinius and Lucius Sextius] had not said that they were putting them en bloc." Another dictator was appointed, Publius Manlius Capitolinus. However, he appointed a plebeian as his lieutenant (master of the horse), much to the annoyance of the patricians, and supported the plebeians. When it was time for the election of the plebeian tribunes, Gaius Licinius and Lucius Sextius announced that they would not stand for reelection unless the plebeians "wanted the proposed measures carried as a whole." The two plebeian tribunes were re-elected (for the tenth time), which meant that the law of the consulship was now also carried. Then they carried the law on the sacred Sibylline Books. This, according to Livy, "was regarded as a further step towards opening the path to the consulship." However, he did not specify why. He also wrote "[t]he plebs, satisfied with their victory, made the concession to the patricians that for the present all mention of consuls should be dropped." Consular tribunes were elected for 367 BC.

In 367 BC Marcus Furius Camillus was again appointed as dictator, this time to fight Gauls who had got into territories near Rome. The senate, bruised by years of civic strife, carried the proposals of the plebeian tribunes and the two consuls were elected. In 366 BC Lucius Sextius Lateranus became the first plebeian consul. The patricians refused to confirm this, commotions broke out and the plebeians were close to seceding (see plebeian secessions). Marcus Furius, "however, quieted the disturbances by arranging a compromise; the nobility made a concession in the matter of a plebeian consul, the plebs gave way to the nobility on the appointment of a praetor to administer justice in the City who was to be a patrician. Thus after their long estrangement the two orders of the State were at length brought into harmony".

== The laws ==
=== Lex de aere alieno ===
This law provided that the interest already paid on debts should be deducted from the principal and that the payment of the rest of the principal should be in three equal annual instalments.

Indebtedness was a major problem among the plebeians, particularly among small peasant farmers, and this led to conflicts with the patricians, who were the aristocracy, the owners of large landed estates and the creditors. Several laws regulating credit or the interest rates of credit to provide some relief for debtors were passed during the period of the Roman Republic.

=== Lex de modo agrorum ===
This law restricted individual ownership of public land in excess of 500 iugeras (300 acres) and forbade the grazing of more than 100 cattle on public land.

Shortages of land for the poor was a significant problem during the Roman Republic. Roman citizens were given plots of lands of two iugera from the ager publicus. These were barely sufficient to feed a family. The rich landowners acquired large estates by encroaching on public land, which reduced the amount of this land which could be given to the poor (plebeian) farmers. Several laws limiting private ownership of land to limit this encroachment on the ager publicus were passed, but they seemed have been easy to evade and to have only a limited effect, if at all. The restrictions on the amount of grazing on public land was due to the fact that extensive grazing could reduce the resources available to poor farmers from this common land, which they needed to sustain their livelihoods.

=== Lex de consule altero ex plebe (et de praetore ex patribus creando?) ===
This law provided for the termination of the military tribunes with consular powers and the return to regular consulships, one of which was to be held by the plebeians. It is possible that the law also provided for the creation of a new and elected magistracy (office of state), the praetorship, as Livy wrote that in 367 BC "the plebs gave way to the nobility on the appointment of a praetor"; that is, the plebeians agreed that the praetor should be a patrician. The praetors were chief justices who presided over criminal trials and could appoint judges for civil cases. Later they issued edicts for amendments of existing laws. They also held imperium; that is, they could command an army. Thirty years later, in 337 BC, the plebeians gained access to the praetorship, when the first plebeian praetor, Quintus Publius Philo, was elected.

=== Lex de Decemviri Sacris Faciundis ===
This provided for the abolition of the Duumviri (two men) Sacris Faciundis, who were two patrician priests who were the custodians of the sacred Sibylline Books and consulted and interpreted them at times, especially when there were natural disasters, pestilence, famine or military difficulties. These were the books of the Sibylline oracles, who were Greek oracles who resided in various places in the Greek world. Tarquinius Superbus, the seventh and last king of Rome, was said to have bought these books from a Sybil from Cumae, a Greek city in southern Italy (near Naples, 120 miles south of Rome) in the late sixth century BC. The law provided for the creation of a college of ten priests (decemviri) as a replacement of the duumviri, known as the Decemviri sacris faciundis. Five of them were to be patricians and five were to be plebeians. This would break the patrician monopoly of the priesthood for the first time and constituted a step towards the plebeians sharing power, as the priesthoods played an important role in Roman society. Later, other priesthoods were opened up to the plebeians. The patricians retained exclusivity in some of the oldest priesthoods.

== Modern evaluation ==
Livy's account of the struggles of Gaius Licinius and Lucius Sextius and their legislation on the consulship has been analysed by T.J. Cornell. He thinks that very little of Livy's narrative can be accepted. However, its institutional changes are "reasonably certain." He argues that the significance of the law on the consulship is unclear and its background is "extremely puzzling" due to obscurity around the military tribunes with consular power. Livy wrote that they had been instituted because it was decided that in some years the consulship should be replaced by the consular tribunes (whose numbers varied from three to six), that this office would be open to plebeians and that it had been created as a concession to the plebeians who wanted access to the consulship. However, from 444 BC (the year of the first consular tribunes) to 401 BC there were only two plebeian consular tribunes (out of a total of 100). For the 400-376 BC period, in 400, 399 and 396 BC the majority of these tribunes were plebeians (4, 5, and 5 out of 6, respectively) and in 379 BC there were three plebeians of six. This raises some questions. Why from 444 to 401 BC were there only two plebeians? Why, given the presence of plebeians in the subsequent period, which shows their eligibility to the highest office, was plebeian access to the consulship considered such a landmark for the political promotion of the plebeians? Why was there such resistance to this? The sources seem to see the law as a breakthrough not just because it provided access to the consulship, but because it required that one of the two consuls each year be a patrician. However, during one twelve-year period after the passage of the laws, from 355 to 343 BC, both consuls were patricians and the consulship became an unbroken line of shared office only after that.

Cornell notes that, according to Livy and his sources, the regular and unbroken sharing of the consulship stemmed from the Lex Genucia proposed by the plebeian tribune Lucius Genucius in 342 BC which, it is claimed, allowed plebeians to hold both consulships. However, the Fasti consulares (a chronicle of yearly events in which the years are denoted by their consuls) suggest that this law made it obligatory for one consulship to be held by a plebeian. This most probably explains why the first instance of plebeians holding both consulships was in 173 BC despite Livy's interpretation. It might be that it was the Lex Genucia which truly introduced power-sharing between patricians and plebeians and that the Lex Licinia Sextia may simply have been an administrative adjustment which transferred plebeian access to the highest office from the consular tribunes to the consulship and, thus, Lucius Sextius becoming the first plebeian consul "becomes rather less impressive." Von Fritz and Sordi also think that the Lex Licinia Sextia on the consuls and the praetors was an administrative reform.

The significance of the law on the consulship of 367 BC, according to Cornell, lies elsewhere. He suggests that before this law, the plebeian tribunes were excluded from high office and that the plebeians who served prior to this were clients of the patricians who had nothing to do with the plebeian movement and its agitations or the Plebeian Council and did not hold plebeian offices (they were neither plebeian tribunes nor aediles, their assistants). Cornell argues "[t]hat the aim of Licinius and Sextius was to abolish all forms of discrimination against the plebeians as such", and their law was a victory for the plebeians who were attracted to the plebeian movement and chose to join this, rather than becoming clients of patricians, which offered nominal prestige, but no independent power. Many leading plebeians were "wealthy, socially aspiring and politically ambitious". It was a small group of "rich men who made common cause with the poor and [ ] used the institutions of the plebeian movement to gain entry into the ranks of the ruling class", which necessitated a struggle against the exclusiveness of the patricians. Some of these men were wealthy landowners who, thus, shared the same interests as the patricians, as the case of Gaius Licinius, who was fined for breaking his own agrarian law by exceeding the 500 iugera limit, shows.

The outcome of the Leges Liciniae Sextiae was the facilitation of the emergence of a patrician-plebeian aristocracy and once the leading plebeians had entered the ruling class on an equal footing with the patricians, they turned their back on the poor plebeians, who "gained some temporary economic relief, but lost control of their organisation." The plebeian council passed the agrarian and the debt laws, which were in tune with the interests of the poor plebeians, but rejected the law on the consulship. Those who opposed the latter had good reason to be suspicious because "[s]uch a measure, they knew, would destroy the plebeian movement." It lost its identity and ceased to exist as a separate organisation. Its institutions were incorporated into the structures of the state. The tribunate and the aedilship were increasingly occupied by young nobles who treated them as stepping stones for the consulship; "the men who held them did not consider themselves in any way bound to promote the interests of the mass of the plebs." Livy described some plebeian tribunes as 'slaves of the nobility'

== See also ==
- Conflict of the Orders
- Military tribunes with consular power
- Plebeian tribune
- Aedile
- Plebeian Council
- Roman dictator
- Lex Sempronia agraria

== Bibliography ==
- Beck, Hans; et al., eds. (2011). Consuls and res publica. Cambridge University Press. ISBN 978-1-107-00154-1. LCCN 2011017494.
  - Smith, Christopher. "The magistrates of the early Roman republic". In Beck et al. (2011), pp. 19–40.
  - Bergk, Alexander. "The development of the praetorship in the third century BC". In Beck et al. (2011), pp. 61–74.
- Cornell, Tim (1995). The beginnings of Rome. London: Routledge. ISBN 0-415-01596-0. OCLC 31515793.
- Drogula, Fred K (2015). Commanders and command in the Roman republic and early empire. University of North Carolina Press. ISBN 978-1-4696-2127-2.
- Forsythe, Gary (2005). A critical history of early Rome. Berkeley: University of California Press. ISBN 978-0-520-94029-1. OCLC 70728478.
- Livy (1905) [1st century AD]. From the Founding of the City . Translated by Roberts, Canon – via Wikisource.
