= Bisellium =

Ancient Roman seat of honor

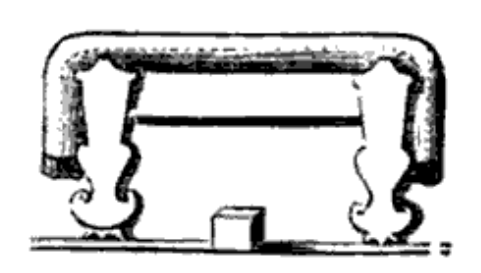
An image of the bisellium from a grave in Pompeii

A bisellium (from Latin bi-, "two", and sella, "seat") was an ancient Roman chair of honor. Bestowed as a mark of distinction on individuals of merit in Roman municipalities, the right to use a bisellium in public places, such as the theatre or forum, was a highly prized privilege. Although it was a double-width seat, it was intended for one person. The bisellium, while similar in appearance to the sella curulis magisterial seat, did not have the symbolic meaning of power projected by the latter.

While numerous examples of (mainly bronze) furniture presumed to be biselliums have been recovered from Pompeii and Herculaneum (and made it into multiple museums), most of them later were found to be couches (klinēs) shortened during incorrect restorations.

The bisellium had been extensively studied, with multiple recent works: Schäfer 1990, Silvestrini 2008, Laird 2015.

== History and use ==
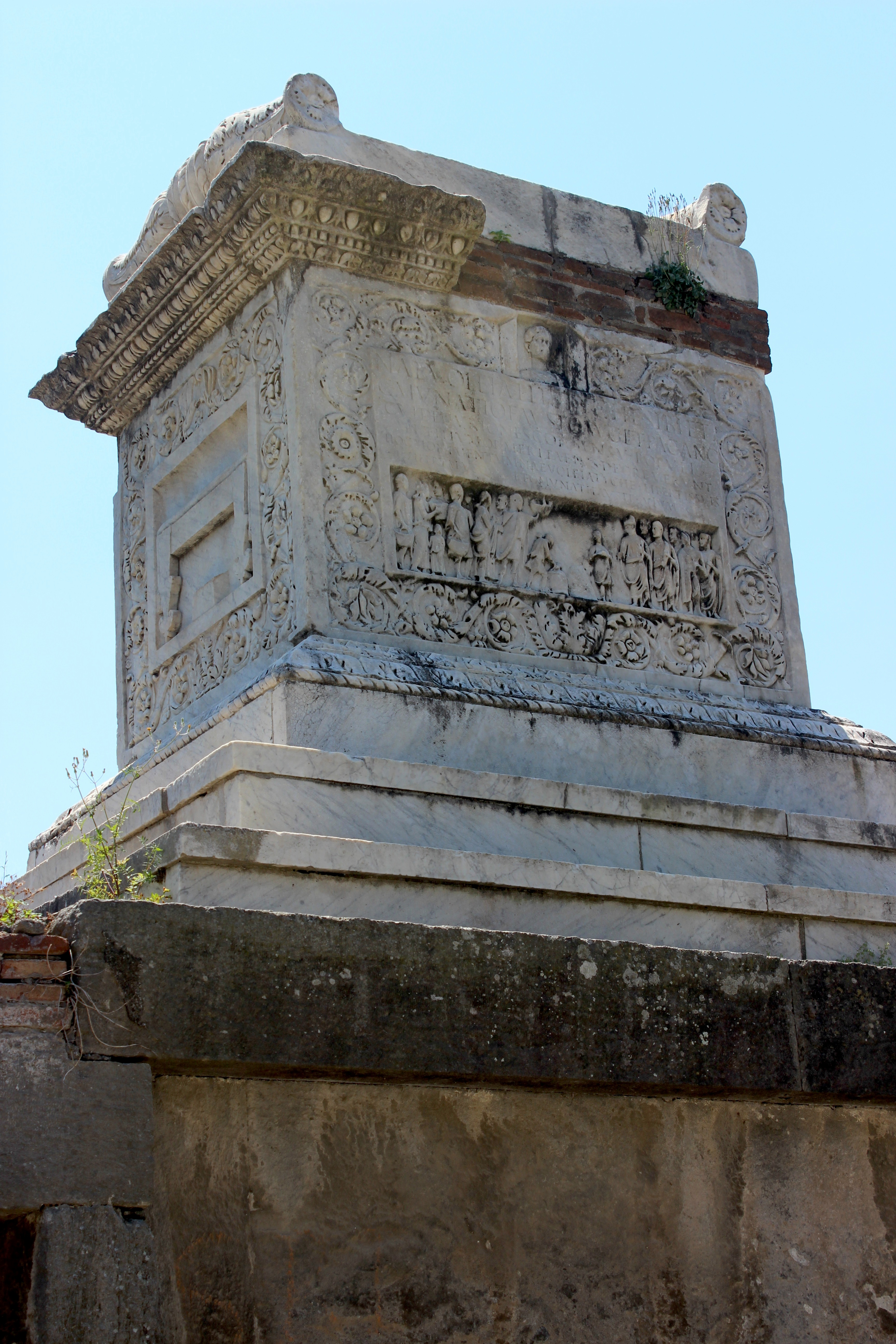
An image of bisellium on a tomb in Pompeii (on the left side of the altar)

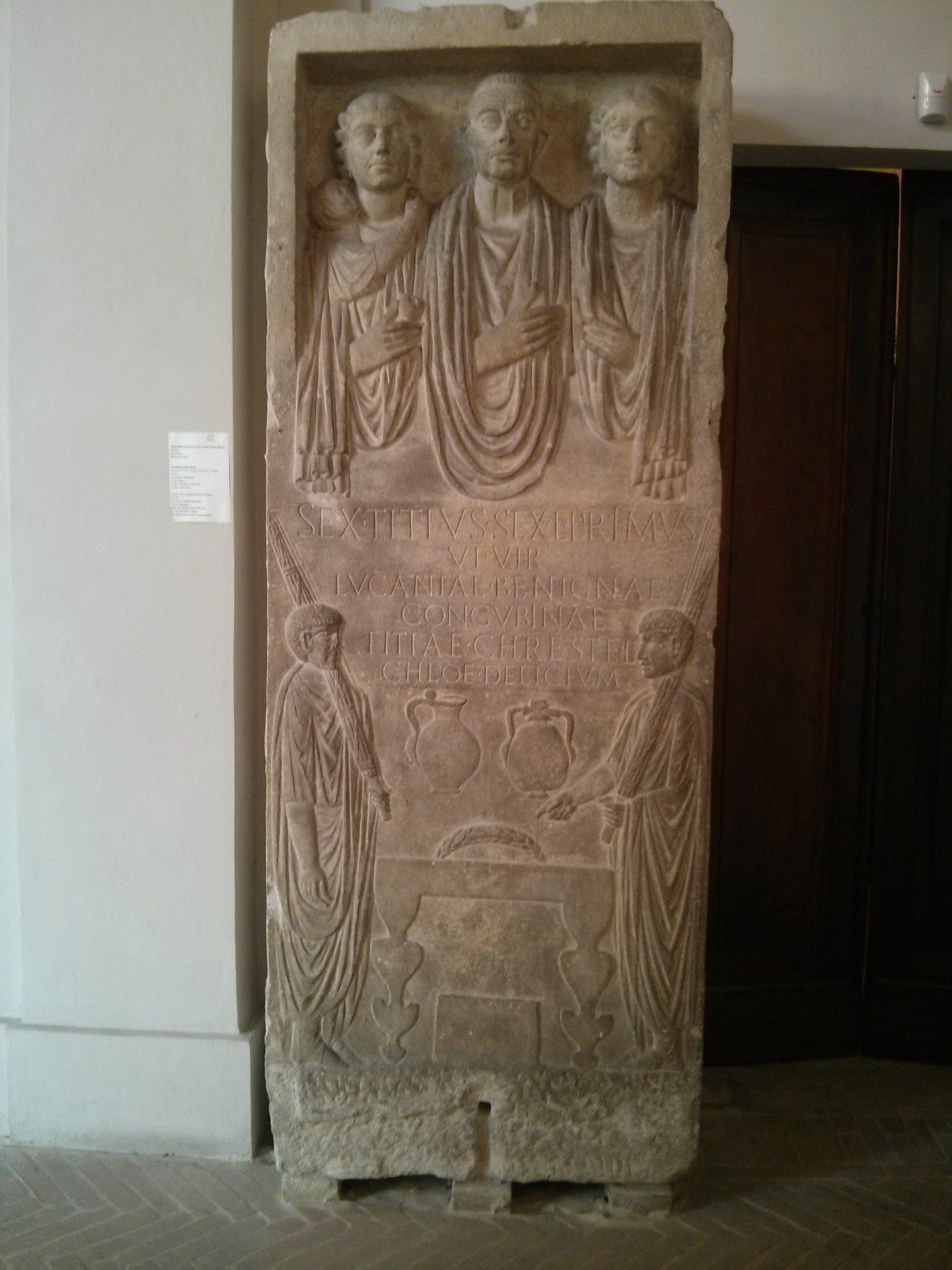
Funerary stela with bisellium and a wreath (at the bottom)

The actual word bisellium is only found in the Roman sources once (Varro, De lingua latina) and is defined as a seat wide enough for two. The corresponding Latin: honor bisellii (also honor biselliatus) awarded to a person (biselliarius) is well documented, usually bestowed for the assistance of the municipality or colony, above all in donations of money for public events or public buildings.

The honor recipients were primarily freedmen, which made them similar to Augustales. This was a rare honor (in the second Augustan region, 126 Augustales are known, but only three persons are found to be granted the bisellium) and sometimes prompted the recipient to donate another large sum of money to the city.

The image of an honor was frequently placed on a tomb of the biselliarius, often with an epitaph recording the honor bisellii award (unlike the curule seat or fasces, images of which on the tomb were never accompanied by text). A small group of reliefs includes a wreath resting on the bisellium with unclear meaning.

The honor of the bisellium was a civic distinction granted by a decree of the local town council (decurions). It was typically awarded to wealthy patrons who had made significant financial contributions to the town, such as funding public buildings or games. The honor allowed the recipient to occupy this special seat at public gatherings (like a theatre or amphitheater), placing them in a position of prominence among the populace. It is unclear if any other special privileges were awarded with it.

== False bisellia ==
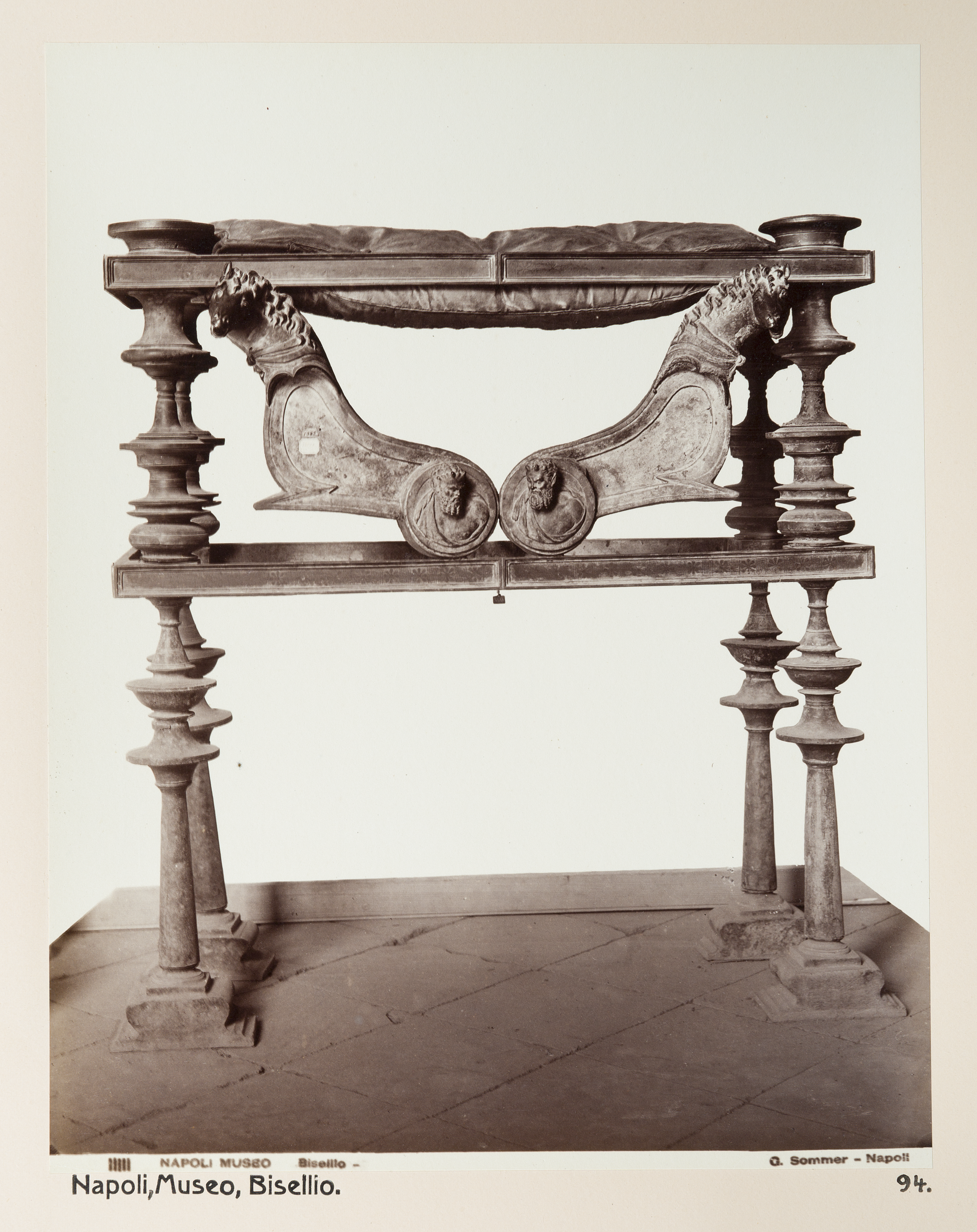
A "bisellium". The couch is made twice shorter and fulcra (with animal heads) are erroneously mounted underneath the frame (cf. Martins & Schwahn 2014)

The couches (klinēs) were common four-legged furniture pieces with wooden frame. While cheaper versions used wood throughout, the more elaborate ones used metal for frame fittings, fulcra (attachments for backrests), and legs. During the restoration, the frame fittings, that covered about half of the original wooden frame, were used to estimate the original size of furniture item found. As a result, the pieces were reconstituted into wide stools and declared to be biselliums, this tradition had started with E. Pistolesi in 1858. The results wound up in the literature (and museums).

The problem was noticed by Walther Amelung in 1902. He suggested that "the bronze coverings of the wooden frame [...] were mistakenly placed against each other on the long sides," "[...] and only because this restoration resulted in a seat that was too large for a person, but too small for a bed, did people fall into the assumption that these are Bisellia". Amelung's paper led to changes in the future reconstructions and dismantling of the erroneously assembled pieces.

== See also ==
- Diphros, an Hellenistic double seat
- Subsellium

== Sources ==
- Ramsay, William (1875). "Sella". A Dictionary of Greek and Roman Antiquities. London: John Murray.
- Spano, Giuseppe (1930). "bisellio". Enciclopedia Treccani (in Italian).
- Martins, Sigrun; Schwahn, Birgit (2014). "Das Bisellium, das eine Kline war–Rekonstruktion, Restaurierung und technologische Untersuchung römischer Klinenfragmente" [The bisellium that was a cline – Reconstruction, restoration and technological investigation of Roman cline fragments]. Restaurierung und Archäologie (in German). 7: 27–51.
- Paton, James M. (1904). "Archaeological Discussions" (PDF). American Journal of Archaeology. 8 (3). Archaeological Institute of America: 297–337. ISSN 0002-9114. JSTOR 497083.
- Schäfer, Thomas (1990). "Der Honor bisellii". Mitteilungen des Deutschen Archäologischen Instituts. Römische Abteilung (in German). 97: 307–346.
- Silvestrini, Marina (2008). "L'epigrafe in onore dell'Augustale Lucio Gellio Primigenio". In Berrendonner, Clara; Cébeillac-Gervasoni, Mireille; Lamoine, Laurent (eds.). Le quotidien municipal dans l'Occident romain (in Italian). Presses Univ Blaise Pascal. pp. 349–364. ISBN 978-2-84516-385-0.
- Laird, Margaret L. (2015-09-15). "Ob honorem bisellii: The Grammar of Representation". Civic Monuments and the Augustales in Roman Italy. Cambridge University Press. pp. 40–70. ISBN 978-1-107-00822-9.
- Bell, Sinclair W.; Borbonus, Dorian; MacLean, Rose (2024-05-23). Freed Persons in the Roman World: Status, Diversity, and Representation. Cambridge University Press. ISBN 978-1-009-43853-7.
- Vandevoorde, Lindsey (2017). "Roman Citizenship of Italian *Augustales. Evidence, Problems, Competitive Advantages" (PDF). Revue belge de philologie et d'histoire. 95 (1): 81–108. doi:10.3406/rbph.2017.8990. ISSN 0035-0818.
- Amelung, Walther (1902). "Das capitolinische "Bisellium"". Mitteilungen des Deutschen Archäologischen Instituts, Römische Abteilung (in German). 17. Rom: Loescher: 269–276.
