= Genucia gens =

Ancient Roman family

The gens Genucia was a prominent family of the Roman Republic. It was probably of patrician origin, but most of the Genucii appearing in history were plebeian. The first of the Genucii to hold the consulship was Titus Genucius Augurinus in 451 BC.

== Origin ==
The Genucii have traditionally been regarded as a gens with both patrician and plebeian branches, in part because they held consulships in 451 and 445 BC, when the office is generally supposed to have been closed to the plebeians. But in support of the argument that Titus Genucus Augurinus, the consul of 451, was a plebeian, it has been noted that several other consuls in the decades preceding the decemvirate bore names that in later times were regarded as plebeian. (Note: Particularly L. Junius Brutus, one of the first consuls in 509 BC, S. Cassius Viscellinus in 502, 493, and 486, and M'. Tullius Longus in 500; from this some scholars conclude that the consulship was not formally closed to the plebeians until the decemvirate. Others argue that their names may have been later insertions, or even that the distinction between the orders was not fully developed at the beginning of the Republic. However, as Broughton notes with respect to Brutus, the weight of tradition is that these individuals were patricians, and they were so regarded by later generations; furthermore it was common for patrician families to have plebeian branches, and entirely plausible that in some cases the patrician lines faded into obscurity, leaving only the plebeian ones in later times.) Further, Diodorus Siculus gives the consul's name as Minucius. But Livy, Dionysius, and the Capitoline Fasti all give Genucius, and the same man is supposed to have been one of the first college of decemvirs; all of the other decemvirs that year were patricians. If the consulship were not absolutely closed to the plebeians before the decemvirate, all historical sources agree that it was when Marcus Genucius was consul in 445. (Note: In answer to this, Mommsen doubts the authenticity of the names assigned to the consulship of 445. Additionally, in this year the plebeians' insistence on being allowed to stand for the consulship resulted in the compromise that created the consular tribunes, who might be either patrician or plebeian; while Livy expressly states that the first plebeians actually elected to this office achieved it in BC 400, the names given for earlier years strongly suggest that plebeians were elected for the years 444 (the year after Genucius is supposed to have been consul) and 422. Thus, assuming that Marcus Genucius was consul in 445, it remains conceivable that he was a plebeian, and that the consular tribunes were created in response to his election.)

Plebeian Genucii appear as early as 476 BC, when a Titus Genucius was tribune of the plebs. If the gens was originally patrician, then the plebeian Genucii may have arisen as the result of intermarriage with the plebeians, or because some of the Genucii were expelled from the patriciate or voluntarily chose to become plebeians. Throughout the history of the Republic, these Genucii were renowned as representatives of and advocates for the rights of the plebeian order.

== Praenomina ==
The Genucii of the Republic favoured the praenomina Lucius, Titus, Marcus, and Gnaeus, all of which were very common throughout Roman history.

== Branches and cognomina ==
The surnames of the Genucii under the Republic included Aventinensis, Augurinus, Cipus or Cippus, and Clepsina.

Augurinus, also the name of a family in the Minucia gens, is derived from the priestly occupation of an augur, although it cannot be determined whether the family acquired this name because one of its ancestors was an augur, or because he resembled one in some respect. The Genucii Augurini were the oldest family of the Genucii, and are generally believed to have been patricians, as two of them held the consulship before it was open to the plebeians; but the Capitoline Fasti give Augurinus as the surname of Gnaeus Genucius, one of the consular tribunes of 399 and 396 BC, who was a plebeian, according to Livy. This apparent inconsistency would be avoided if the Fasti mistakenly assigned him the surname Augurinus instead of Aventinensis, which was the name of a plebeian family of the Genucii. Alternatively, some of the Genucii Augurini may have gone over to the plebeians, as the Minucii Augurini appear to have done.

The surname Aventinensis indicates one who lived on the Aventine Hill, one of the Seven Hills of Rome. The Aventinenses appear in the middle of the fourth century BC, and might have been descended from the Augurini, if Gnaeus Genucius Augurinus, the consular tribune, were the grandfather of Lucius Genucius Aventinensis, consul in BC 365 and 362. In this case, the consular tribune must have had a brother, Marcus, whose son or grandson was consul in 363.

The Clepsinae are described as patricians in the Dictionary of Greek and Roman Biography and Mythology, but since the two known members of that name were consuls with a patrician colleague in 271 and 270, they must have been plebeian. (Note: By that time, at least one consul had to be plebeian, following the provision of the Lex Genucia, passed in 342 BC.) They might have been descended from the Aventinenses, since the two Clepsinae share the filiation "L. f. L. n."; they could have been the sons of Lucius Genucius Aventinensis, consul in 303 BC.

== Members ==
This list includes abbreviated praenomina. For an explanation of this practice, see filiation.

=== Genucii Augurini ===
- Lucius Genucius, grandfather of the consuls of 451 and 445 BC.
- Lucius Genucius L. f., father of the consuls of BC 451 and 445.
- Titus Genucius L. f. L. n. Augurinus, consul in BC 451, and a member of the first decemvirate. Six years later, during his brother's consulship, Titus, a member of the Roman Senate, brought forward the law establishing the office consular tribune, allowing the election of plebeian magistrates.
- Marcus Genucius L. f. L. n. Augurinus, consul in 445 BC. He and his colleague strenuously opposed the lex Canuleia, repealing the prohibition on the intermarriage between patricians and plebeians. After that law was passed, Marcus consulted with his brother, Titus, the consul of 451, on ways to resolve the strife between the orders, although some accused them of carrying on the business of the state in secret.
- Marcus Genucius M. f. Augurinus, father of the consular tribune.
- Gnaeus Genucius M. f. M. n. Augurinus, consular tribune in 399 and 396 BC. In the former year, Rome was ravaged by a plague, but the Roman forces besieging Veii met with some success. In his second tribuneship, Genucius and one of his colleagues, Lucius Titinius, were ambushed by a force of Faliscans and Capenates; Genucius died bravely in the fighting.

=== Genucii Aventinenses ===
- Marcus Genucius Cn. f., father of Lucius, the consul of 365 and 362 BC.
- Marcus Genucius M. f., father of Gnaeus, the consul of 363 BC.
- Lucius Genucius M. f. Cn. n. Aventinensis, consul in 365, a year of terrible plague, marked by the death of Marcus Furius Camillus. Consul for the second time in 362, he was the first plebeian consul to lead an army in the field. Ambushed by the Hernici, Genucius was surrounded and killed when his troops panicked, leading the patricians to claim vindication for their opposition to the election of plebeian consuls.
- Gnaeus Genucius M. f. M. n. Aventinensis, consul in 363 BC, the third year of a great plague, which distracted from the threat of war with the Hernici. Lucius Manlius Capitolinus was nominated dictator in order to perform the rite of clavum fingere, in hopes of appeasing the gods.
- Lucius Genucius (Aventinensis), tribune of the plebs in 342 BC, brought forward a number of reforms, known as the leges Genuciae, abolishing usury, preventing the same person from holding two curule magistracies in the same year, or the same office twice within the next ten years (until 332 BC), and requiring that at least one consul had to be plebeian.
- Lucius Genucius L. f. M. n. Aventinensis, consul in 303 BC, a year of relative peace, in which colonies were sent to Sora and Alba Fucens, Roman citizenship was granted to Arpinum and Trebula, Frusino was punished for conspiring with the Hernici, and a large force of Umbrian raiders was trapped in a cave and destroyed.

=== Genucii Clepsinae ===
- Gaius Genucius L. f. L. n. Clepsina, consul in 276 BC, in which year Rome was again beset by pestilence. Consul for the second time in 270, either he or his brother, who had been consul the previous year, captured the town of Rhegium, which had revolted, and sent most of the soldiers responsible to Rome for trial, where they were scourged and beheaded.
- Lucius Genucius L. f. L. n. Clepsina, consul in 271 BC, probably began the siege of Rhegium, although it is uncertain whether the town was ultimately captured by him, or by his brother, who was consul when the town fell the following year.

=== Others ===
- Titus Genucius, tribune of the plebs in 476 BC, proposed an agrarian law, and accused Titus Menenius Lanatus in connection with the disaster at the Cremera and subsequent defeat at the hands of the Etruscans.
- Gnaeus Genucius, tribune of the plebs in 473 BC, attempted to pass the agrarian law, and charged the consuls of the previous year with misconduct for having obstructed it. On the day of their trial, Genucius was found murdered in his house, a deed which helped set in motion the events leading to the ratification of the lex Publilia two years later.
- Genucius, tribune of the plebs in an uncertain year, perhaps BC 241. According to Plutarch, war was declared against the Faliscans as the result of some insult offered to Genucius.
- Lucius Genucius, one of the ambassadors sent to Syphax, king of Numidia, in 210 BC, during the Second Punic War.
- Marcus Genucius, a military tribune serving under the consul Lucius Cornelius Merula in 193 BC. He fell in battle against the Boii.
- Lucius Genucius L. f., a senator in 129 BC.
- Genucius, a priest of the Magna Mater, was denied the right of inheritance by the consul Mamercus Aemilius Lepidus in 77 BC, on the grounds that he was a eunuch.
- Genucius Cipus or Cippus, praetor in an uncertain year, voluntarily chose exile after the haruspices declared he would become king upon his return to the city. (Note: "[Genucius Cipus], a Roman praetor, to whom an extraordinary prodigy is said to have happened. For, as he was going out of the gates of the city, clad in the paludamentum, horns suddenly grew out of his head, and it was said by the haruspices that if he returned to the city, he would be king: but lest this should happen, he imposed voluntary exile upon himself.")

== See also ==
- List of Roman gentes

== Bibliography ==
- Polybius, Historiae (The Histories).
- Diodorus Siculus, Bibliotheca Historica (Library of History).
- Titus Livius (Livy), Ab Urbe Condita (History of Rome).
- Dionysius of Halicarnassus, Romaike Archaiologia.
- Publius Ovidius Naso (Ovid), Metamorphoses.
- Valerius Maximus, Factorum ac Dictorum Memorabilium (Memorable Facts and Sayings).
- Gaius Plinius Secundus (Pliny the Elder), Naturalis Historia (Natural History).
- Sextus Julius Frontinus, Strategemata (Stratagems).
- Plutarchus, Lives of the Noble Greeks and Romans.
- Appianus Alexandrinus (Appian), Bellum Samniticum (History of the Samnite Wars).
- Lucius Cassius Dio Cocceianus (Cassius Dio), Roman History.
- Eutropius, Breviarium Historiae Romanae (Summary of Roman History).
- Paulus Orosius, Historiarum Adversum Paganos (History Against the Pagans).
- Johannes Lydus, De Magistratibus Reipublicae Romanae (On the Magistrates of the Roman Republic).
- Joannes Zonaras, Epitome Historiarum (Extracts of History).
- Dictionary of Greek and Roman Biography and Mythology, William Smith, ed., Little, Brown and Company, Boston (1849).
- T. Robert S. Broughton, The Magistrates of the Roman Republic, American Philological Association (1952).
- Robert K. Sherk, "The Text of the Senatus Consultum De Agro Pergameno", in Greek, Roman, and Byzantine Studies, vol. 7, pp. 361–369 (1966).
- F. W. Walbank, A. E. Astin, M. W. Frederiksen, R. M. Ogilvie (editors), The Cambridge Ancient History, vol. VII, part 2, The Rise of Rome to 220 B.C., Cambridge University Press, 1989.
- T. Corey Brennan, The Praetorship in the Roman Republic, Oxford University Press, 2000.
