= Attalus (sculptor) =

Ancient Greek sculptor

Attalus (Ancient Greek: Ἄτταλος), son of Andragathus, was a sculptor of ancient Athens whose time is unknown.

The geographer and historian Pausanias mentions a statue of Apollo Lykeios, in the temple of that god at Argos, which was made by Attalus. His name has also been found on a statue discovered on the site of the Argos Theater, and on a bust.
