= Lucius Aemilius Mamercinus (consul 366 BC) =

4th-century BC Roman consul

Lucius Aemilius L.f. Mamercinus was a Roman patrician of the fourth century BC. He was consular tribune in 377, magister equitum in 368 and 352, consul in 366 and 363, and interrex in 355 BC.

== See also ==
- Aemilia (gens)

Political offices
| Preceded by Aulus Cornelius Cossus II, Marcus Cornelius Maluginensis II, Marcus Geganius Macerinus, Publius Manlius Capitolinus II, Lucius Veturius Crassus Cicurinus II, Publius Valerius Potitus Poplicola VI as Tribuni militum consulari potestate | Consul of the Roman Republic; 366 BC with Lucius Sextius Sextinus Lateranus | Succeeded by Lucius Genucius Aventinensis and Quintus Servilius Ahala |
| Preceded by Gaius Sulpicius Peticus and Gaius Licinius Calvus | Consul of the Roman Republic; 363 BC with Gnaeus Genucius Aventinensis | Succeeded by Quintus Servilius Ahala II and Lucius Genucius Aventinensis II |
