= Akhraten =

4th-century BC King of Kush

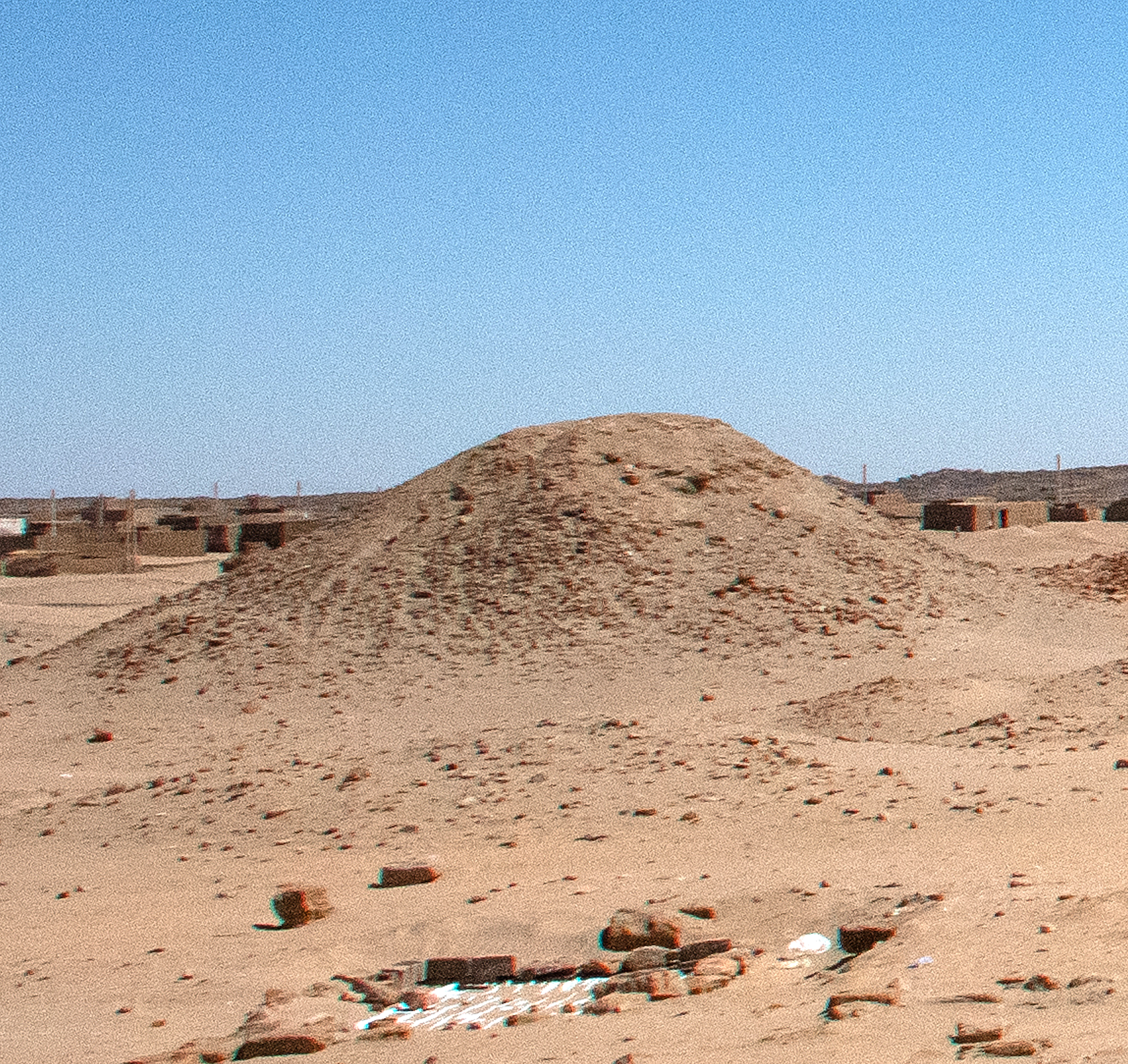
- Nuri pyramid Nu XIV of King Akhraten

Kushite King of Meroë
- Reign: (c. 350–335 BCE)
- Predecessor: Harsiotef
- Successor: Nastasen or Amanibakhi
Royal titulary
Horus name
Kanakht Tjema Neditef ("Mighty Bull whose arm is powerful, Protector of his Father")
Praenomen
Neferibre ("Re is one whose heart is beautiful")
Nomen
Akhraten

G39 N5	i A1 x r T M22 M22
- Father: Harsiotef?
- Born: BCE
- Died: c. 335 BCE
- Burial: Pyramid N14 at Nuri
- Dynasty: Meroitic period

Akhraten (also transliterated Akhratan) was a King of Kush (ca. 350 BCE – 335 BCE).

Akhraten took on at least some titles based on those used by the Egyptian pharaohs.

Akhratan may have been a son of Harsiotef and a brother of Nastasen.

Akhratan is known from a cartouche in a chapel and from a black granite statue found in Barkal Temple 500, now located in Boston (23.735). The statue is headless and is missing its feet.

Akhraten may have been succeeded as King of Kush by Nastasen, but some scholars suggest that a king named Amanibakhi may have ruled between Akraten and Nastasen.
