= Subsellia =

The subsellia were benches in the Forum Romanum where the plebeian tribunes would sit during the day in order to be available to Roman citizens.

== Function ==
The tribunes' benches represented the typical sitting right of the Roman magistrates. The plebeian tribunes sat on the benches during business hours to perform their duties. Due to the transparency of the tribune benches, it was easy for plebs to contact the tribunes and make use of the ius auxilii, the right of help. Because there was no kind of civil service contact point, the tribunes usually were contacted personally, at the benches, in case of civil problems. Official transactions were conducted orally and, since they were not reduced to writing, in full public view.

== Placement ==
Prior to the third century BC, tribunes of the plebs were not allowed to attend at Senate meetings. Their benches were thus placed in front of the entrance to the Curia, where the Senate met. From this, the tribunes could object to senatorial decisions immediately.

In later times, the tribune benches were placed in front of the Basilica Porcia, a public mall near the Forum, to accommodate the large number of people seeking tribunician assistance and to allow the tribunes to make open-air speeches. This location was near the Tarpeian Rock, a steep cliff used as an execution site. The condemned would necessarily pass the tribune benches on their way to execution, thus allowing tribunes to stop an execution of a plebeian by invoking the ius intercedendi.
