= Amanibakhi =

4th century BC Kushite King of Meroe

Kushite King of Meroë
- Reign: 4th century BC
- Predecessor: Akhraten
- Successor: Nastasen
Royal titulary
Nomen
Amanibakhi

G39 N5	i mn n D5 E11 x D5 A40
- Burial: Unknown at this point

Amanibakhi was a Kushite King of Meroe. His reign dates to the 4th century BC.

Amanibakhi was the successor of Akhraten and the predecessor of Nastasen. The burial place of Amanibakhi is not known. A stele of his is now located in the Boston Museum of Fine Arts
