= Lucius Genucius =

4th-century BCE Roman politician

Lucius Genucius (Aventinensis) was a nobleman of the Genucia gens of ancient Rome who lived in the 4th century BCE.

He was tribune of the plebs in 342 BCE, and brought forward a number of reforms in the wake of the Samnite Wars, known as the Leges Genuciae, abolishing usury, preventing the same person from holding two curule magistracies in the same year, or the same office twice within the next ten years (until 332 BCE), and requiring that at least one consul had to be plebeian. These reforms were, with the Licinio-Sextian rogations, the capstone legislation of the centuries-old Conflict of the Orders that defined much of Roman politics for the early history of the Republic.
