= Quindecimviri sacris faciundis =

Ancient Roman priestly college

In ancient Rome, the quindecimviri sacris faciundis were the fifteen (quindecim) members of a college (collegium) with priestly duties. They guarded the Sibylline Books, scriptures which they consulted and interpreted at the request of the Senate. This collegium also oversaw the worship of any foreign gods which were introduced to Rome. They were also responsible for responding to divine advice and omens.

Originally these duties had been performed by duumviri (or duoviri), two men of patrician status. Their number was increased to ten by the Licinian-Sextian Law in 367 BC, which also required for half of the priests to be plebeian. During the Middle Republic, members of the college were admitted through co-option. Sulla increased the number of priests to fifteen. The Lex Domitia removed their ability to select their own members in 104 BC. Afterwards candidates from wealthy Roman gentes would be elected.

At some point in the third century BC, several priesthoods, probably including the quindecimviri, began to be elected through the voting tribes.
