= Gaius Licinius Stolo =

4th-century BC Roman tribune and consul

Gaius Licinius Calvus Stolo, along with Lucius Sextius, was one of the two tribunes of ancient Rome who opened the consulship to the plebeians.

A member of the Calvii branch of the plebeian Licinia gens, Stolo was tribune from 376 BC to 367 BC, during which he passed the lex Licinia Sextia restoring the consulship, requiring a plebeian consul seat, limiting the amount of public land that one person could hold, and regulating debts. He also passed a law stipulating that the Sibylline Books should be overseen by decemviri, of whom half would be plebeians in order to prevent any falsification in favor of the patricians. The patricians opposed these laws, though they finally were passed. Licinius was then elected consul for 361 BC (Fasti Capitolini).

He was later charged with violating his own laws concerning the ownership of land and was forced to pay a heavy fine.

Although Livy describes the activities of Gaius Licinius in great detail, it is likely that his description is not accurate; much of it is suspiciously similar to events in the age of the Gracchi two hundred years later, and it is quite possible that the annalist Licinius Macer invented episodes of his family's activities.

He was married to the youngest daughter of Marcus Fabius Ambustus. An anecdote frequently told said that Stolo's wife urged him to procure the consulship for plebeians through the Lex Licinia Sextia, as she was jealous of the honors of Servius Sulpicius Praetextatus, the patrician husband of her sister. As early as the turn of the 19th century, the German historian Barthold Georg Niebuhr pointed out the historical untrustworthiness and contradictions in this tale.

Political offices
Preceded by Quintus Servilius Ahala II; Lucius Genucius Aventinensis II	Roman consul 361 BC with Gaius Sulpicius Peticus II	Succeeded by Marcus Fabius Ambustus; Gaius Poetelius Libo Visolus
