= Lucius Genucius Aventinensis =

Roman consul

Lucius Genucius Aventinensis, was a nobleman of ancient Rome of the Genucia gens who lived in the 4th century BC. He, along with Quintus Servilius Ahala, was one of the two consuls of ancient Rome in 365 BC.

Genucius was also the consul of 362 BC again with Quintus Servilius Ahala. Genucius was killed in battle between 362 BC and 358 BC during the Roman conquest of the Hernici. He is often confused with the Lucius Genucius who was the tribune of the plebs in 342 BC.

Political offices
Preceded by Lucius Aemilius Mamercinus and Lucius Sextius Sextinus Lateranus	Consul of the Roman Republic; 365 BC with Quintus Servilius Ahala	Succeeded by Gaius Sulpicius Peticus and Gaius Licinius Calvus
