= Quintus Servilius Ahala =

4th-century BC Roman general and statesman

Quintus Servilius Ahala (fl. c. 365–342 BC) was a Roman general and statesman. He held the office of consul three times, in 365, 362 and 342 BC. In 360, he was appointed dictator to face a threat of invading Gauls, whom he defeated near the Colline Gate. He later served as interrex in 355 BC, and magister equitum under the dictator Marcus Fabius Ambustus in 351.

Political offices
Preceded by Lucius Aemilius Mamercinus; Lucius Sextius Lateranus	Roman consul 365 BC; With: Lucius Genucius Aventinensis	Succeeded by Gaius Sulpicius Peticus; Gaius Licinius Calvus
Preceded by Cn. Genucius Aventinensis; Lucius Aemilius Mamercinus	Roman consul II; 362 BC; With: Lucius Genucius Aventinensis	Succeeded by Gaius Licinius Stolo; Gaius Sulpicius Peticus
Preceded by Marcus Valerius Corvus; Aulus Cornelius Cossus Arvina	Roman consul III; 342 BC; With: Gaius Marcius Rutilus	Succeeded by Gaius Plautius Venox; Lucius Aemilius Mamercinus Privernas
