= Leges Genuciae =

Ancient Roman laws

Leges Genuciae (also Lex Genucia or Lex Genucia de feneratione) were laws passed in 342 BC by Tribune of the Plebs Lucius Genucius Aventinensis.

These laws covered several topics: they banned lending that carried interest, which soon was not enforced; they forbade holding two magistracies at the same time or within the next 10 years (until 332 BC); and lastly, they required at least one consul to be a plebeian.

The first time both consuls were plebeian was in 172 BC. By then, that provision was the only one that continued to be enforced.

== See also ==
- Roman law
- List of Roman laws
