= Sibylline Books =

Collection of prophecies used in Rome

The Sibylline Books (Latin: Libri Sibyllini) were a collection of oracular utterances, set out in Greek hexameter verses, that, according to tradition, were purchased from a sibyl by the last King of Rome, Lucius Tarquinius Superbus, and consulted at momentous crises through the history of the Roman Republic and the Empire.

Only fragments have survived, the rest being lost or deliberately destroyed. The Sibylline Books are not the same as the Sibylline Oracles, which are fourteen books and eight fragments of prophecies thought to be of Judaeo-Christian origin.

== History ==
Michelangelo's rendering of the Erythraean Sibyl

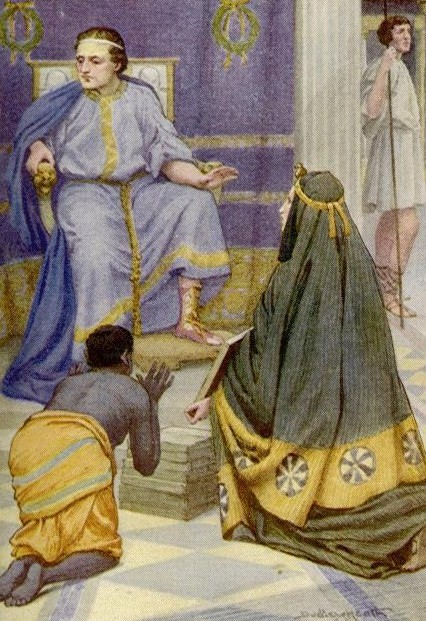
Tarquin the Proud receives the Sibylline Books (1912 illustration)

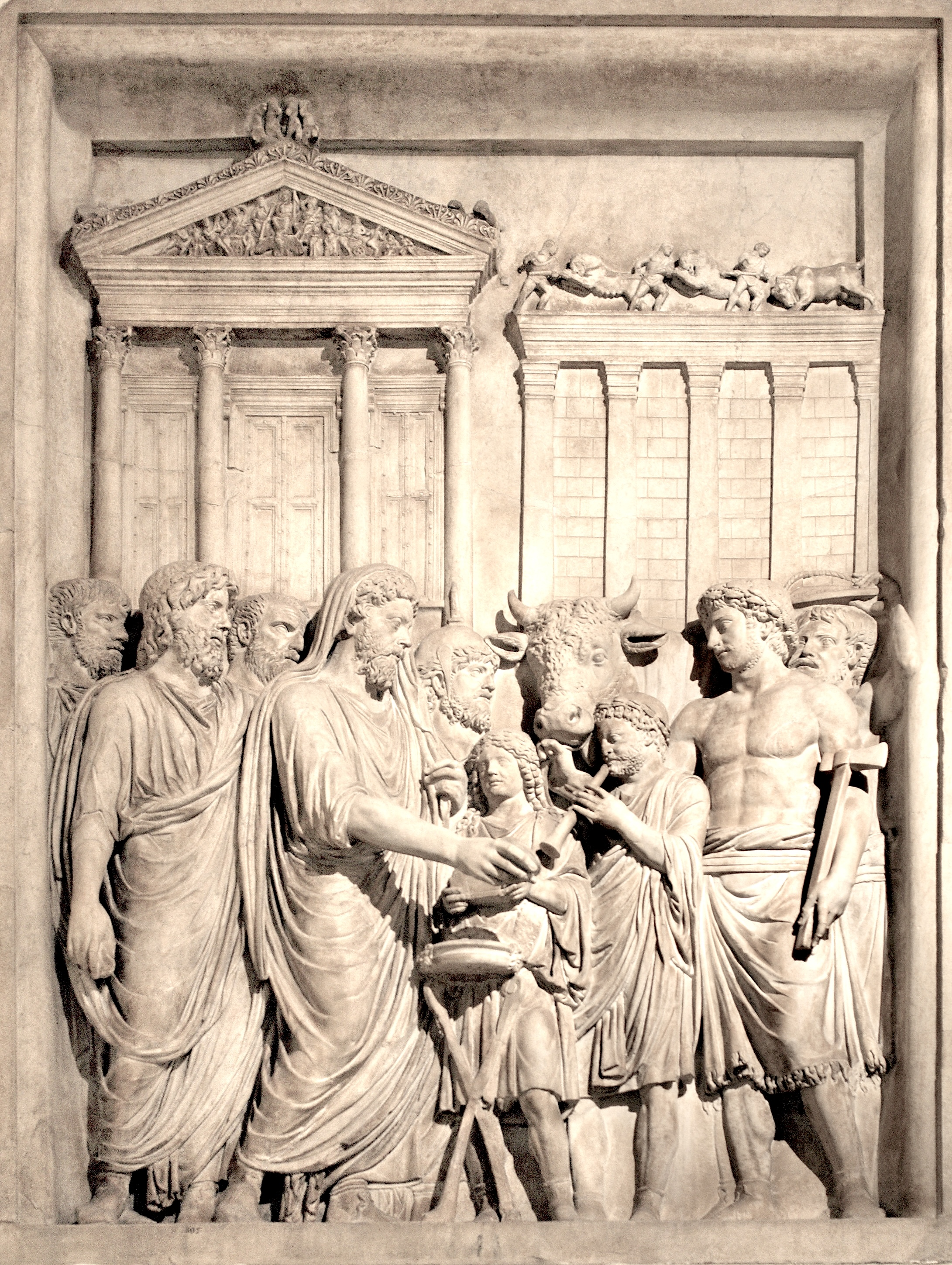
Relief of Marcus Aurelius sacrificing at the fourth temple of Jupiter

According to the Roman tradition, the oldest collection of Sibylline books appears to have been made about the time of Solon and Cyrus at Gergis on Mount Ida in the Troad; it was attributed to the Hellespontine Sibyl and was preserved in the temple of Apollo at Gergis. From Gergis the collection passed to Erythrae, where it became famous as the oracles of the Erythraean Sibyl. It would appear to have been this very collection that found its way to Cumae (see the Cumaean Sibyl) and from Cumae to Rome.

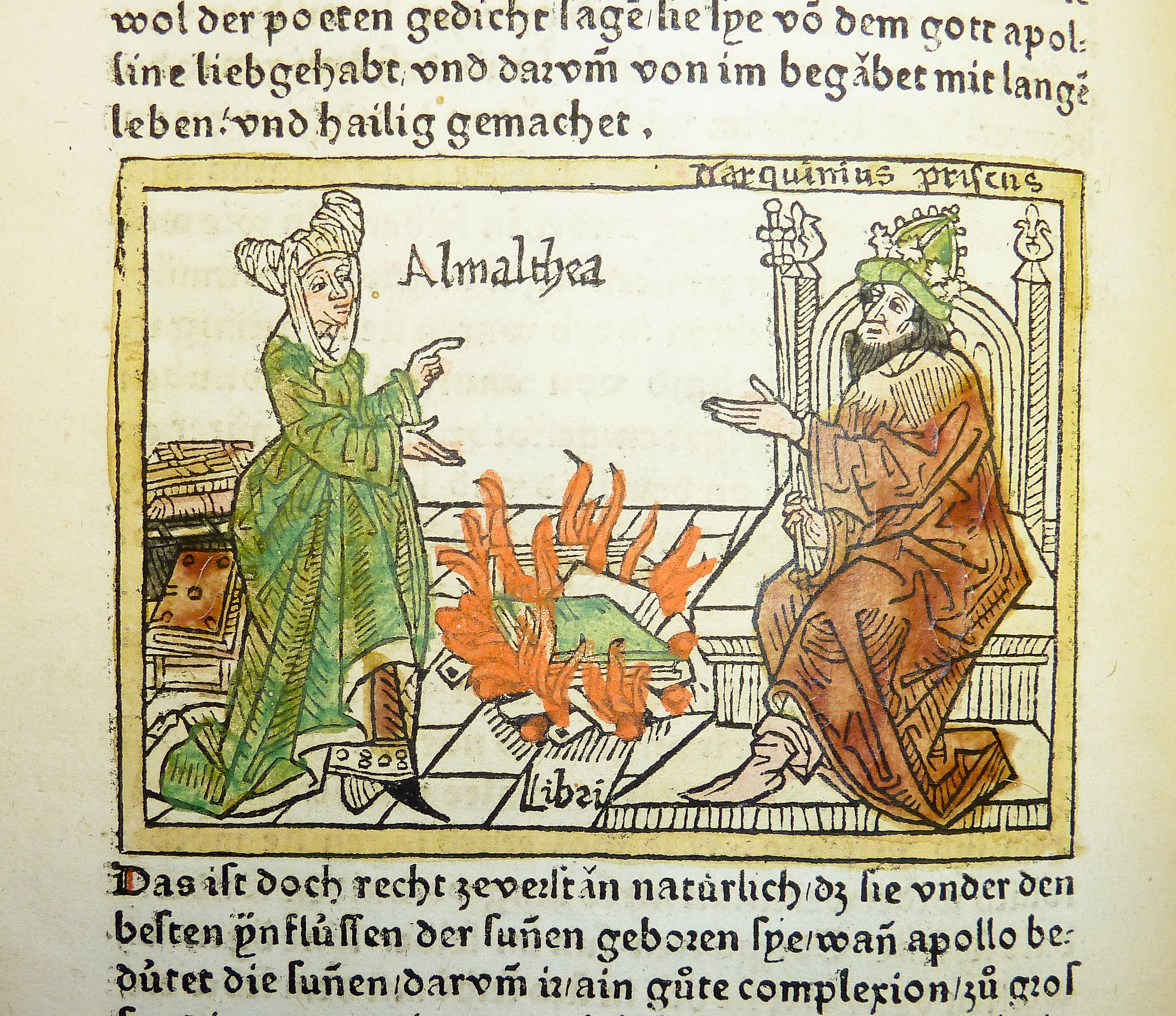
16th-century illustration of the Cumaean Sibyl (Amalthea) burning some of the Sibylline books while Tarquin (confused with Lucius Tarquinius Priscus) watches.

The story of the acquisition of the Sibylline Books by the seventh and last king of Rome, Lucius Tarquinius Superbus ("Tarquinius", ruled 534 to 509 B.C., d. 495 B.C.), is one of the famous legendary elements of Roman history. An old woman, possibly a Cumaean Sibyl, offered to Tarquinius nine books of these prophecies at an exorbitant price; when the king declined to purchase them, she burned three and offered the remaining six to Tarquinius at the same price, which he again refused. Thereupon, she burned three more and repeated her offer, maintaining the same price. Tarquinius then consulted the Augurs whose importance in Roman history is averred by Livy. The Augurs deplored the loss of the six books and urged purchase of the remaining three. Tarquinius then purchased the last three at the full original price, and had them preserved in a sacred vault beneath the Capitoline temple of Jupiter. The story is alluded to in Varro's lost books quoted in Lactantius Institutiones Divinae (I: 6) and by Origen, and told by Aulus Gellius (Noctes Atticae 1, 19).

The Roman Senate kept tight control over the Sibylline Books, and entrusted them to the care of two patricians. In 367 BC, the number of custodians was increased to ten, five patricians and five plebeians, who were called the decemviri sacris faciundis. Subsequently, probably in the time of Sulla, their number was increased to fifteen, the quindecimviri sacris faciundis. They were usually ex-consuls or ex-praetors. They held office for life, and were exempt from all other public duties. They had the responsibility of keeping the books in safety and secrecy. The 15 individuals were custodians of the Sibylline Books that were kept on the Palatine. These officials, at the command of the Senate, consulted the Sibylline Books in order to discover not exact predictions of definite future events in the form of prophecy, but the religious observances necessary to avert extraordinary calamities and to expiate ominous prodigies (comets and earthquakes, showers of stones, plague, and the like). It was only the rites of expiation prescribed by the Sibylline Books, according to the interpretation of the oracle that were communicated to the public, and not the oracles themselves, which left ample opportunity for abuses.

In particular, the keepers of the Sibylline Books had the superintendence of the worship of Apollo, of the "Great Mother" Cybele or Magna Mater, and of Ceres, which had been introduced upon recommendations as interpreted from the Sibylline Books. The Sibylline Books motivated the construction of eight temples in ancient Rome, aside from those cults that have been interpreted as mediated by the Sibylline Books simply by the Greek nature of the deity. Thus, one important effect of the Sibylline Books was their influence on applying Greek cult practice and Greek conceptions of deities to indigenous Roman religion, which was already indirectly influenced through Etruscan religion. As the Sibylline Books had been collected in Anatolia, in the neighborhood of Troy, they recognized the gods and goddesses and the rites observed there and helped introduce them into Roman state worship, a syncretic amalgamation of national deities with the corresponding deities of Greece, and a general modification of the Roman religion.

Since they were written in hexameter verse and in Greek, the college of curators was always assisted by two Greek interpreters. When the Temple of Jupiter on the Capitol temple burned in 83 BC, the original books were lost.

The Roman Senate sent envoys in 76 BC to replace them with a collection of similar oracular sayings, in particular collected from Ilium, Erythrae, Samos, Sicily, and Africa. This new Sibylline collection was deposited in the restored temple, together with similar sayings of native origin, e.g. those of the Sibyl at Tibur (the 'Tiburtine Sibyl') of the brothers Marcius, and others, which had been circulating in private hands but which were called in, to be delivered to the Urban Praetor, private ownership of such works being declared illicit, and to be evaluated by the Quindecimviri, who then sorted them, retaining only those that appeared true to them.

From the Capitol they were transferred by Augustus as pontifex maximus in 12 BC, to the Temple of Apollo Palatinus, after they had been examined and copied; there they remained until about AD 405. According to the poet Rutilius Claudius Namatianus, the general Flavius Stilicho (died AD 408) burned them, as they were being used to attack his government. The last known consultation was in 363 CE.

Some supposedly genuine Sibylline verses are preserved in the Book of Marvels or Memorabilia of Phlegon of Tralles (2nd century AD). These represent an oracle, or a combination of two oracles, of seventy hexameters in all. They report the birth of an androgyne, and prescribe a long list of rituals and offerings to the gods. Their authenticity has been questioned.

=== Relationship with the Sibylline Oracles ===
The Sibylline Oracles were quoted by the Roman-Jewish historian Josephus (late 1st century) as well as by numerous Christian writers of the second century, including Athenagoras of Athens who, in a letter addressed to Marcus Aurelius in ca. AD 176, quoted verbatim a section of the extant Oracles, in the midst of a lengthy series of other classical and pagan references such as Homer and Hesiod, stating several times that all these works should already be familiar to the Roman Emperor. Copies of the actual Sibylline Books (as reconstituted in 76 BC) were still in the Roman Temple at this time. The Oracles are nevertheless thought by modern scholars to be anonymous compilations that assumed their final form in the fifth century, after the Sibylline Books perished. They are a miscellaneous collection of Jewish and Christian portents of future disasters, that may illustrate the confusions about sibyls that were accumulating among Christians of late antiquity.

== Consultations of the Books cited in history ==
An incomplete list of consultations of the Sibylline Books recorded by historians:

- 461 BC: Strange signs, including a rain of meat, caused two officials to consult the books, which warned of a "concourse of alien men", but the tribunes believed it to be a deliberate invention to halt progress on legal reforms. (Livy 3)
- 399 BC: The books were consulted following a pestilence, resulting in the institution of the lectisternium ceremony. (Livy 5, 13)
- 348 BC: A plague struck Rome after a brief skirmish with the Gauls and Greeks. Another lectisternium was ordered. (Livy 7, 27)
- 345 BC: The books were consulted when a "shower of stones rained down and darkness filled the sky during daylight". Publius Valerius Publicola was appointed dictator to arrange a public holiday for religious observances. (Livy 7, 28)
- 295 BC: They were consulted again following a pestilence, and reports that large numbers of Appius Claudius' army had been struck by lightning. A Temple was built to Venus near the Circus Maximus. (Livy 10, 31)
- 293 BC: After yet another plague, the books were consulted, with the prescription being 'that Aesculapius must be brought to Rome from Epidaurus'; however, the Senate, being preoccupied with the Samnite Wars, took no steps beyond performing one day of public prayers to Aesculapius. (Livy 10, 47)
- 240/238 BC: The Ludi Florales, or "Flower Games", were instituted after consulting the books.
- 216 BC: When Hannibal annihilated the Roman Legions at Cannae, the books were consulted, and on their recommendation, two Gauls and two Greeks were buried alive in the city's marketplace.
- 205–204 BC: During the Second Punic War, upon consultation of the Sibylline Books, an image of Cybele was transferred from Pessinos (Pessinous or Pergamon) to Rome. An embassy was sent to Attalus I of Pergamon to negotiate the transfer. Publius Cornelius Scipio Nasica and Claudia Quinta were said to have received the image of Cybele at Ostia on her arrival in 204 BC. Cybele's image was placed within the Temple of Victory on the Palatine. In honour of Cybele a lectisternium was performed and her games, the Megalesia, were held. The image of Cybele was moved to the Temple of the Magna Mater in 191 BC when the temple was dedicated by Marcus Junius Brutus in the consulship of Publius Cornelius Scipio Nasica. A fragment of Valerius Antias from Livy's Ab Urbe Condita 36.36.4 records that Megalesia were again held in 191 BC and that "[they] were the first to be held with dramatic performances".
- 143 BC: Frontinus relates a story in which the Decemvirs consulted the books on another matter and found that a proposed project for the Aqua Marcia was improper, along with the Anio. After a debate in the Senate the project was resumed, presumably the necessity for water outweighed the oracle. Sextus Julius Frontinus, Aqueducts of Rome, Book I, Ch 7.
- 63 BC: Believing in a prediction of the books that 'three Cornelii' would dominate Rome, Publius Cornelius Lentulus Sura took part in the conspiracy of Catiline (Plutarch, Life of Cicero, XVII)
- 56 BC: As Romans deliberated sending a force to restore Ptolemy XII to the throne of Egypt, lightning struck the statue of Jupiter on the Alban Mount; the oracles were consulted, and one was found to read "If the King of Egypt comes to you asking for assistance, refuse him not your friendship, yet do not grant him any army, or else you will have toil and danger". This considerably delayed Ptolemy's return. (Dio Cassius History of Rome 39:15)
- 44 BC: According to Suetonius, a sibylline prediction that only a king could triumph over Parthia fueled rumors that Caesar, leader of the then republic, was aspiring to kingship. (Caesar, 79)
- 15 AD: When the Tiber River flooded the lower parts of Rome, one of the priests suggested consulting the books, but Emperor Tiberius refused, preferring to keep the divine things secret. (Tacitus, Annales I, 76)
- 64 AD: The Emperor Nero consulted them following the Great Fire of Rome. (Tacitus, Annales XV, 44)
- 271 AD: The books were consulted following the Roman defeat at Placentia by the Alamanni.
- 312 AD: Maxentius consulted the Sibylline Books in preparation for combat with Constantine, who had just taken all of Maxentius' northern Italian cities and was marching on Rome.
- 363 AD: Julian the Apostate consulted the books in preparation for marching against the Sassanids. The response mailed from Rome "in plain terms warned him not to quit his own territories that year". (Ammianus Marcellinus, History of Rome, XXIII 1, 7)
- 405 AD: Stilicho ordered the destruction of the Sibylline Books, possibly because Sibylline prophecies were being used to attack his government in the face of the attack of Alaric I.

== Bibliography ==
- Beard, Mary (1980). Religions of Rome: Volume 2, A Sourcebook.
- Cameron, Alan (2011). The Last Pagans of Rome. Oxford University Press. ISBN 978-0-19-974727-6.
- Diels, Hermann Alexander (1890). Sibyllinische Blatter (in German).
- Jens Fischer (2020). Q. Fabius Pictor, das Orakel von Delphi und die sibyllinischen Bücher Roms – Zur Rolle von Orakeln in Rom und Griechenland, Gymnasium 127 (2020) 535–567
- Jens Fischer (2022). Folia ventis turbata – Sibyllinische Orakel und der Gott Apollon zwischen später Republik und augusteischem Principat (Studien zur Alten Geschichte 33), Göttingen 2022
- Eric M. Orlin (2002). Temples, Religion, and Politics in the Roman Republic ch. 3 "The Sibylline Books".
- "Sibylline Oracles" . Encyclopædia Britannica. Vol. 25 (11th ed.). 1911. p. 19.
- Singer, Isidore; et al., eds. (1901–1906). "Sibyl". The Jewish Encyclopedia. New York: Funk & Wagnalls.
- George, Alexandra L. "Oracles/Sibyls: 700 BC – AD 300", King's College: History Department, Nov. 2005. Oracles.
