= Tribune of the plebs =

Ancient Roman political office

Tribune of the plebs, tribune of the people or plebeian tribune (Latin: tribunus plebis) was the first office of the Roman state that was open to the plebeians, and was, throughout the history of the Republic, the most important check on the power of the Roman Senate and magistrates. These tribunes had the power to convene and preside over the Concilium Plebis (people's assembly); to summon the senate; to propose legislation; and to intervene on behalf of plebeians in legal matters; but the most significant power was to veto the actions of the consuls and other magistrates, thus protecting the interests of the plebeians as a class. The tribunes of the plebs were typically found seated on special benches set up for them in the Roman Forum. The tribunes were sacrosanct, meaning that any assault on their person was punishable by death. In imperial times, the powers of the tribunate were granted to the emperor as a matter of course, and the office itself lost its independence and most of its functions.

== Establishment of the tribunate ==
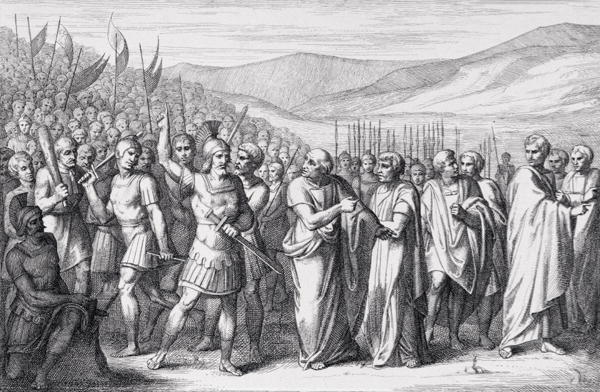
The Secession of the People to the Mons Sacer, engraving by B. Barloccini, 1849

Fifteen years after the expulsion of the kings and establishment of the Roman Republic, the plebeians were burdened by crushing debt. A series of clashes between the people and the ruling patricians in 495 and 494 BC brought the plebeians to the brink of revolt, and there was talk of assassinating the consuls. Instead, on the advice of Lucius Sicinius Vellutus, the plebeians seceded en masse to the Mons Sacer (the Sacred Mount), a hill outside of Rome. The senate dispatched Agrippa Menenius Lanatus, a former consul who was well liked by the plebeians, as an envoy. Menenius was well received, and told the fable of the belly and the limbs, likening the people to the limbs who chose not to support the belly, and thus starved themselves; just as the belly and the limbs, the city, he explained, could not survive without both the patricians and plebeians working in concert.

The plebeians agreed to negotiate for their return to the city; and their condition was that special tribunes should be appointed to represent the plebeians, and to protect them from the power of the consuls. No member of the senatorial class would be eligible for this office (in practice, this meant that only plebeians were eligible for the tribunate), and the tribunes should be sacrosanct; any person who laid hands on one of the tribunes would be outlawed, and the whole body of the plebeians entitled to kill such person without fear of penalty. The senate agreeing to these terms, the people returned to the city.

The first tribuni plebis were Lucius Albinius Paterculus and Gaius Licinius, appointed for the year 493 BC. Soon afterward, the tribunes themselves appointed Sicinius and two others as their colleagues.

The ancient sources indicate the tribunes may have originally been two or five in number. If the former, the college of tribunes was expanded to five in 470 BC. Either way, the college was increased to ten in 457 BC, and remained at this number throughout Roman history. They were assisted by two aediles plebis, or plebeian aediles. Only plebeians were eligible for these offices, although there were at least two exceptions.

== Powers of the tribunes ==
Although sometimes referred to as plebeian magistrates, the tribunes of the people, like the plebeian aediles, who were created at the same time, were technically not magistrates, as they were elected by the plebeian assembly alone. However, they functioned very much like magistrates of the Roman state. They could convene the concilium plebis, which was entitled to pass legislation affecting the plebeians alone (plebiscita), and beginning in 493 BC to elect the plebeian tribunes and aediles. From the institution of the tribunate, any one of the tribunes of the plebs was entitled to preside over this assembly. The tribunes were entitled to propose legislation before the assembly. By the third century BC, the tribunes also had the right to call the senate to order, and lay proposals before it.

Ius intercessionis, also called intercessio, the power of the tribunes to intercede on behalf of the plebeians and veto the actions of the magistrates, was unique in Roman history. Because they were not technically magistrates, and thus possessed no maior potestas, they relied on their sacrosanctity to obstruct actions unfavourable to the plebeians. Being sacrosanct, no person could harm the tribunes or interfere with their activities. To do so, or to disregard the veto of a tribune, was punishable by death, and the tribunes could order the death of persons who violated their sacrosanctity. This could be used as a protection when a tribune needed to arrest someone. This sacrosanctity also made the tribunes independent of all magistrates; no magistrate could veto the action of a tribune. If a magistrate, the senate, or any other assembly disregarded the orders of a tribune, he could "interpose the sacrosanctity of his person" to prevent such action. Even a dictator (and presumably an interrex) was not exempted from the veto power, although some sources may suggest the contrary.

The tribunes could veto acts of the Roman Senate. The tribune Tiberius Sempronius Gracchus imposed his veto on all government functions in 133 BC, when the senate attempted to block his agrarian reforms by imposing the veto of another tribune.

Tribunes also possessed the authority to enforce the right of provocatio ad populum, a precursor of the modern right of habeas corpus. This entitled a citizen to appeal the actions of a magistrate by shouting appello tribunos! ("I call upon the tribunes") or provoco ad populum! ("I appeal to the people"). Once invoked, this right required one of the tribunes to assess the situation, and determine the lawfulness of the magistrate's action. Any action taken in defiance of this right was illegal on its face. In effect, this gave the tribunes of the people unprecedented power to protect individuals from the arbitrary exercise of state power, and afforded Roman citizens a degree of liberty unequalled in the ancient world. If the tribune decided to act, he would impose his ius intercessionis ("right of intercession").

== Limitations ==
Although a tribune could veto any action of the magistrates, senate, or other assemblies, he had to be physically present in order to do so.

Because the sacrosanctity of the tribunes depended on the oath of the plebeians to defend them, their powers were limited to the boundaries of the city of Rome. A tribune traveling abroad could not rely on his authority to intervene on behalf of the plebeians. For this reason, the activities of the tribunes were normally confined to the city itself, and a one-mile radius beyond.

== History ==
=== The tribunes in the conflict of the orders ===
In 471 BC the Lex Publilia transferred the election of the tribunes from the comitia curiata to the comitia tributa, thus removing the influence of the patricians on their election.

In 462, the tribune Gaius Terentillius Arsa alleged that the consular government had become even more oppressive than the monarchy that it had replaced. He urged the passage of a law appointing five commissioners to define and limit the powers of the consuls. By threat of war and plague, the issue was postponed for five contentious years, with the same college of tribunes elected each year. In 457, hoping to deprive the law's supporters of their impetus, the senate agreed to increase the number of tribunes to ten, provided that none of the tribunes from the preceding years should be re-elected.

However, the new tribunes continued to press for the adoption of Terentillus' law, until in 454 the senate agreed to appoint three commissioners to study Greek laws and institutions, and on their return help to resolve the strife between the orders. On the return of the envoys, the senate and the tribunes agreed to the appointment of a committee of ten men, known as the decemviri, or decemvirs, to serve for one year in place of the annual magistrates, and codify Roman law. The tribunate itself was suspended during this time. But when a second college of decemvirs appointed for the year 450 BC illegally continued their office into the following year, and the abuses of their authority became clear to the people, the decemvirate was abolished and the tribunate restored, together with the annual magistrates.

Among the laws codified by the decemvirs was one forbidding intermarriage between the patricians and the plebeians; the Twelve Tables of Roman law also codified that the consulate itself was closed to the plebeians. Worse still, in 448, two patricians were co-opted to fill vacant positions in the tribunate, although they proved to be of moderate views, and their year of office was peaceful. To prevent future attempts by the patricians to influence the selection of tribunes, Lucius Trebonius Asper promulgated a law forbidding the tribunes to co-opt their colleagues, and requiring their election to continue until all of the seats were filled. But relations between the orders deteriorated, until in 445, the tribunes, led by Gaius Canuleius, were able to push through a law permitting the intermarriage of patricians and plebeians, and allowing one of the consuls to be a plebeian.

Rather than permit the election of a plebeian consul, the senate resolved upon the election of military tribunes with consular power, who might be elected from either order. Initially this compromise satisfied the plebeians, but in practice only patricians were elected. The regular election of military tribunes in the place of consuls prevented plebeians from assuming the highest offices of state until the year 400 BC, when four of the six military tribunes were plebeians. Plebeian military tribunes served in 399, 396, 383, and 379, but in all other years between 444 and 376 BC, every consul or military tribune with consular powers was a patrician. (Note: Livy writes that only one of the consular tribunes of 400, Publius Licinius, was a plebeian, but here he seems to have misspoken, for three of his five colleagues—Lucius Titinius, Publius Maelius, and Lucius Publilius—were also plebeians. In fact at least two earlier consular tribunes may also have been plebeians: Lucius Atilius, one of the initial consular tribunes in 444 (though he and his colleagues were soon compelled to resign), and Quintus Antonius in 422.)

Beginning in 376 BC, Gaius Licinius Calvus Stolo and Lucius Sextius Lateranus, tribunes of the plebs, used the veto power to prevent the election of any annual magistrates. Continuing in office each year, they frustrated the patricians, who, despite electing patrician military tribunes from 371 to 367, finally conceded the consulship, agreeing to the Licinian Rogations. Under this law, military tribunes with consular power were abolished, and one of the consuls elected each year was to be a plebeian. Although this law was occasionally violated by the election of two patrician consuls, Sextius himself was elected consul for 366, and Licinius in 364. At last, the plebeian tribunes had broken the patrician monopoly on the highest magistracies of the state.

Following their victory in 367 BC, the tribunes remained an important check on the power of the senate and the annual magistrates. In 287 BC, the senate formally recognized the plebiscita as laws with binding force. In 149 BC, men elected to the tribunate automatically entered the Senate.

=== Erosion of the tribunician power at the end of the Republic ===
However, in 81 BC, the dictator Sulla, who considered the tribunate a threat to his power, deprived the tribunes of their powers to initiate legislation, and to veto acts of the senate. He also prohibited former tribunes from holding any other office, effectively preventing the use of the tribunate as a stepping stone to higher office. Although the tribunes retained the power to intercede on behalf of individual citizens, most of their authority was lost under Sulla's reforms. Former tribunes were once again admitted to the annual magistracies beginning in 75 BC, and the tribunician authority was fully restored by the consuls Gnaeus Pompeius Magnus and Marcus Licinius Crassus in 70.

The dignity of the office was further impaired when, in 59 BC, the patrician Publius Clodius Pulcher, who aspired to hold the tribunician power, had himself adopted by a plebeian youth, and renounced his patrician status, in order to be elected tribune for the following year. Although considered outrageous at the time, Clodius' scheme was allowed to proceed, and he embarked on a program of legislation designed to outlaw his political opponents and confiscate their property, while realizing a substantial gain from his actions.

In 48 BC, the senate bestowed the tribunicia potestas (tribunician power) on the dictator Gaius Julius Caesar, who, as a patrician, was ineligible to be elected one of the tribunes. When two of the elected tribunes attempted to obstruct his actions, Caesar had them impeached, and taken before the senate, where they were deprived of their powers. Never again did Caesar face opposition from the tribunes; he held the tribunician power until his death in 44.

In 23 BC, the senate bestowed the tribunician power on Caesar's nephew, Octavian, now styled Augustus. From this point, the tribunicia potestas became a pre-requisite for the emperors, most of whom received it from the senate upon claiming the throne, though some had already received this power during the reigns of their predecessors; the granting of this authority was a means of designating a favoured member of the imperial court as the emperor's intended successor. Agrippa, Drusus the Younger, Tiberius, Titus, Trajan, and Marcus Aurelius each received the tribunician power in this way. With the regular assumption of the tribunician power by the emperors and their heirs, the ancient authority of the tribunes dwindled away.

Although the office of tribune endured throughout imperial times, its independence and most of its practical functions were lost. Together with the aedileship, it remained a step in the political career of many plebeians who aspired to sit in the senate, at least until the third century. There is evidence that the tribunate continued to exist as late as the fifth century AD.

== See also ==
- List of tribunes of the plebs
- Gracchus Babeuf, primary author of a newspaper named The Tribune of the People

== Bibliography ==
- Brennan, T Corey (26 October 2017). "tribunicia potestas". Oxford Research Encyclopedia of Classics. doi:10.1093/acrefore/9780199381135.013.8196. ISBN 978-0-19-938113-5.
- Cornell, Tim (1995). The beginnings of Rome. London: Routledge. ISBN 0-415-01596-0. OCLC 31515793.
- Derow, Peter Sidney (31 August 2016). "tribuni plebis". Oxford Research Encyclopedia of Classics. doi:10.1093/acrefore/9780199381135.013.6554. ISBN 978-0-19-938113-5.
- Drogula, Fred K (2017). "Plebeian tribunes and the government of early Rome". Antichthon. 51: 101–123. doi:10.1017/ann.2017.8. ISSN 0066-4774.
- Forsythe, Gary (2005). A critical history of early Rome. Berkeley: University of California Press. ISBN 978-0-520-94029-1. OCLC 70728478.
- Kondratieff, E J (2018). "Tribuni plebis". Encyclopedia of Ancient History. Wiley. pp. 1–5. doi:10.1002/9781444338386.wbeah20131.pub2. ISBN 978-1-4051-7935-5 – via ResearchGate.
- Lanfranchi, Thibaud (2015). Les tribuns de la plèbe et la formation de la République romaine, 494–287 avant J.-C [The tribunes of the plebs and the formation of the Roman republic, 494–287 BC]. Rome: École Française de Rome.
- Lintott, Andrew (1999). Constitution of the Roman republic. Oxford University Press. ISBN 978-0-19-926108-6. Reprinted 2009.
- Lomas, Kathryn (2018). The rise of Rome. History of the Ancient World. Cambridge: Harvard University Press. doi:10.4159/9780674919938. ISBN 978-0-674-65965-0. S2CID 239349186.
- Steel, Catherine (2014). "The Roman senate and the post-Sullan "res publica"". Historia: Zeitschrift für Alte Geschichte. 63 (3): 323–339. doi:10.25162/historia-2014-0018. ISSN 0018-2311. JSTOR 24432812. S2CID 151289863.
- Smith, Christopher (2012). "The origins of the tribunate of the plebs". Antichthon. 46: 101–125. doi:10.1017/S0066477400000162. ISSN 0066-4774.
- Thommen, Lukas (1989). Das Volkstribunat der späten römischen Republik [The tribunate of the plebs in the late Roman republic]. Historia Einzelschriften. Vol. 59. Stuttgart: Franz Steiner. ISBN 3-515-05187-2.
