= Suardi Chapel =

Oratory/private chapel with cycle of frescos by Lorenzo Lotto

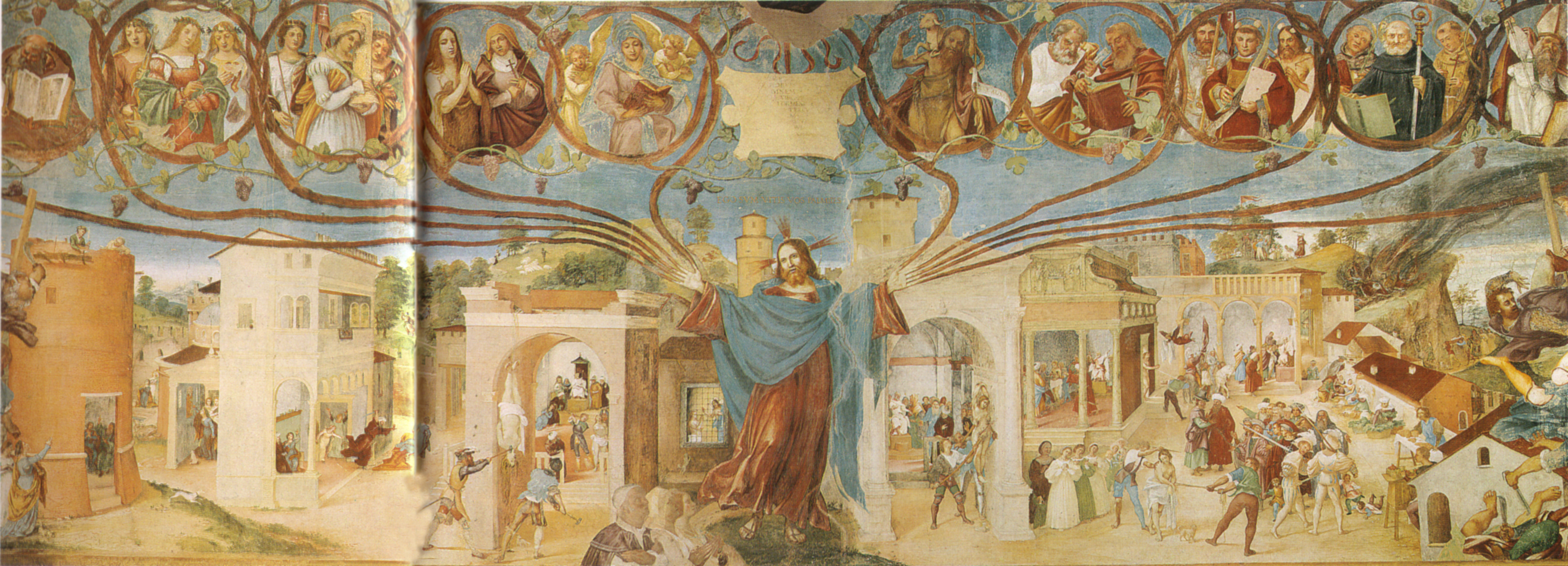
Christ the Vine and Lives of the Saints

The Suardi Chapel is an oratory or private chapel inside the villa in Trescore Balneario, Province of Bergamo owned by the Suardi counts. It is dedicated to Saint Barbara and Saint Brigid and was completely rebuilt by the cousins Giovan Battista and Maffeo Suardi. It was fully covered in 1524 by frescoes they commissioned from Lorenzo Lotto of Christ the Vine and Lives of the Saints. In the 19th century, count Gianforte Suardi built a corridor connecting the chapel to the villa and modified the chapel entrance – those entering had previously immediately found themselves in front of the north wall with its depiction of Christ the Vine.

Located on the road across the Val Cavallina which links Bergamo to Lago d'Iseo, the chapel had existed since the 15th century. Around 1523 count Giovan Battista Suardi commissioned Lotto to decorate the oratory and so the artist immediately moved to the area. By this show of piety, the count hoped to avert a flood (predicted by astrologers for 20 February 1524) and to counter the seeds of Lutheranism brought to northern Italy by the Landsknechts. The frescoes were complete by summer 1524. The artist and commissioners were friends, as shown by their correspondence discussing the cartoons for the intarsi in the choir of Santa Maria Maggiore, Bergamo. Lotto was assisted by Francesco Bonetti, documented as his pupil from 1517 to 1550.

== Iconography ==
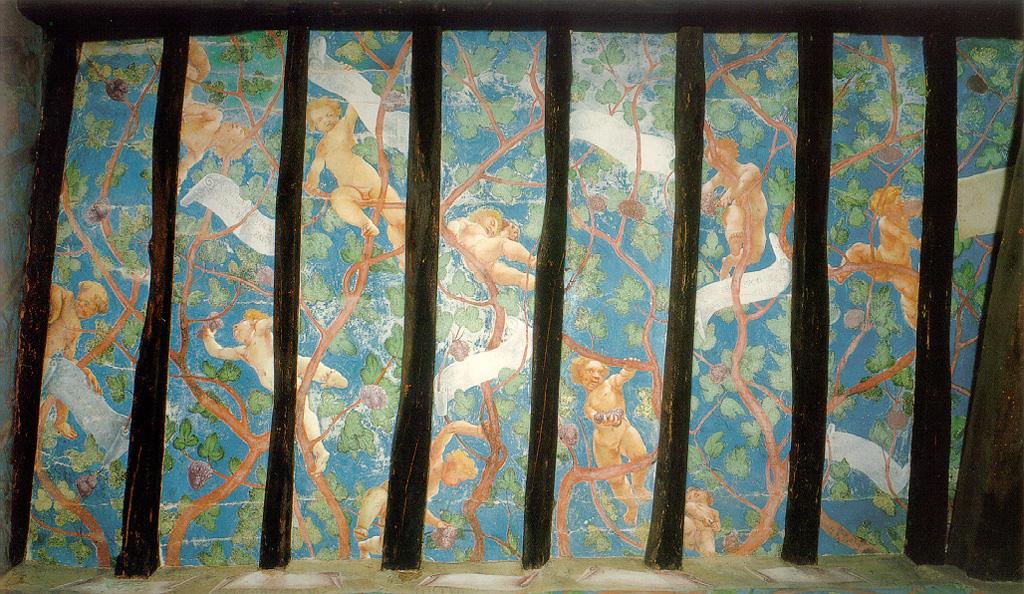
The ceiling

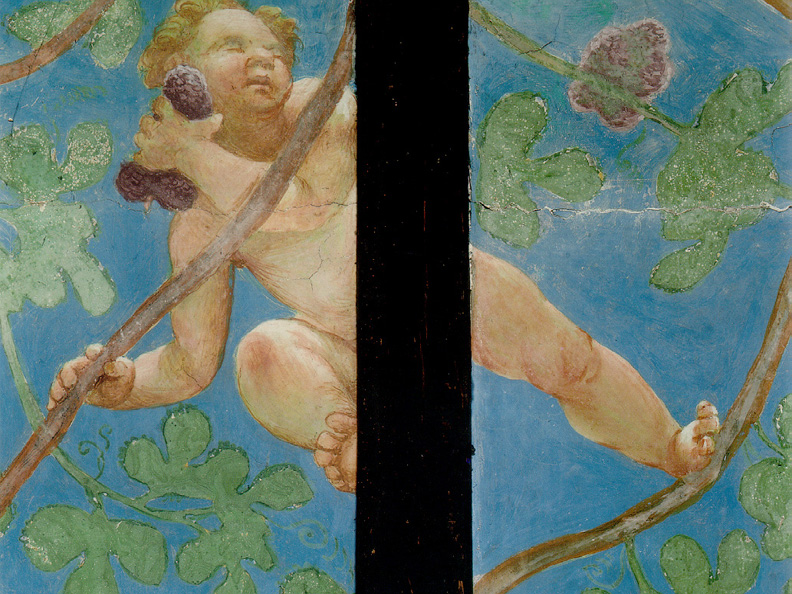
Detail of the ceiling

Simple and rustic in its architecture, the chapel's plan is essentially rectangular with a pitched wooden roof supported by exposed beams and a small semicircular apse with some modest existing frescoes from before Lotto's time. Lotto's frescoes are spread over three walls above a large plinth. Together they form a complex iconographic programme on redemption and faith as incarnated in the lives of saints Barbara (north side), Brigid (south side), Mary Magdalene and Catherine of Alexandria (back wall), along with Christ's victory over evil as predicted by the prophets and sibyls and guaranteed and confirmed in the lives of the saints. Several figures show peasants and other working class figures, often studied from life and previously unrepresented in Italian painting.

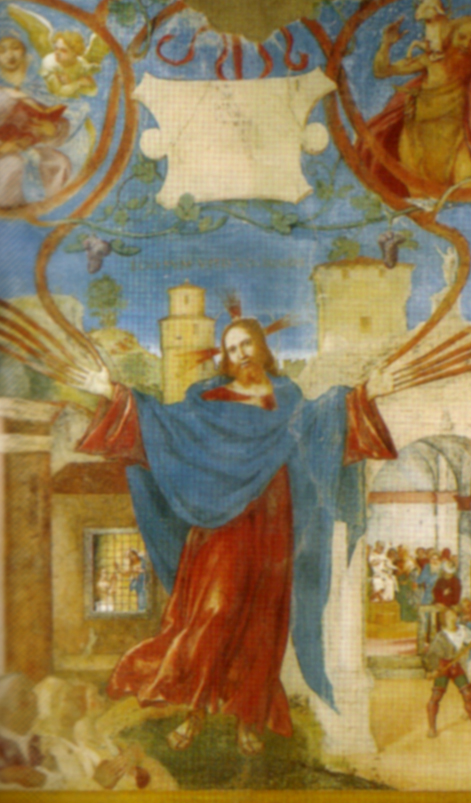
Christ the Vine

Lotto also frescoed the ceiling between (and using) the beams, creating a fake pergola against a bright blue background, with playing putti and cartouches with biblical and liturgical passages about vines and wine as used in the mass. The brushwork is quick but efficient and the work's taste for popular narration (typical of Lotto) remains wedded to the north Italian tradition.

=== Christ the Vine ===
At the centre of the north wall is a monumental figure of Christ the Vine, with arms spread wide. At his feet are the work's commissioners praying – Battista, his wife Orsolina and his sister Paolina. Above these three figures is a dedicatory inscription, part of which is lost, with the commissioners' and the painter's names and the date along with the relevant passage from John 15.5 ("I am the Vine, you are the branches") in Latin in gilded letters. That New Testament text is central to the iconography of the whole chapel, linking the Roman Catholic Church and the lives of saints Barbara, Brigid and Mary Magdalene to Christ in a clear anti-Lutheran polemic.

From Christ's fingers rise vine branches, which end at the ceiling in ten fruit-like circles with images of the saints and Doctors of the Church, with Saint Jerome at the far left and Saint Ambrose at the far right. At either end harvesters with ladders and billhooks fail in their attempt to cut down the branches and fall from the sky - these symbolise historical heretics and some are inscribed with their names. From left to right, the other saints in the circles are Saint Apollonia, Margaret of Antioch with Saint Lucy, Saint Ursula, Saint Barbara with Catherine of Alexandria, Mary Magdalene with Catherine of Siena, the Virgin between two angels, John the Baptist, Saint Peter with Saint Paul, Alexander of Bergamo with Saint Stephen and Saint Sebastian, Saint Dominic with Augustine of Hippo and finally Francis of Assisi. Damaged cartouches above their heads give their names.

=== Life of Saint Barbara ===
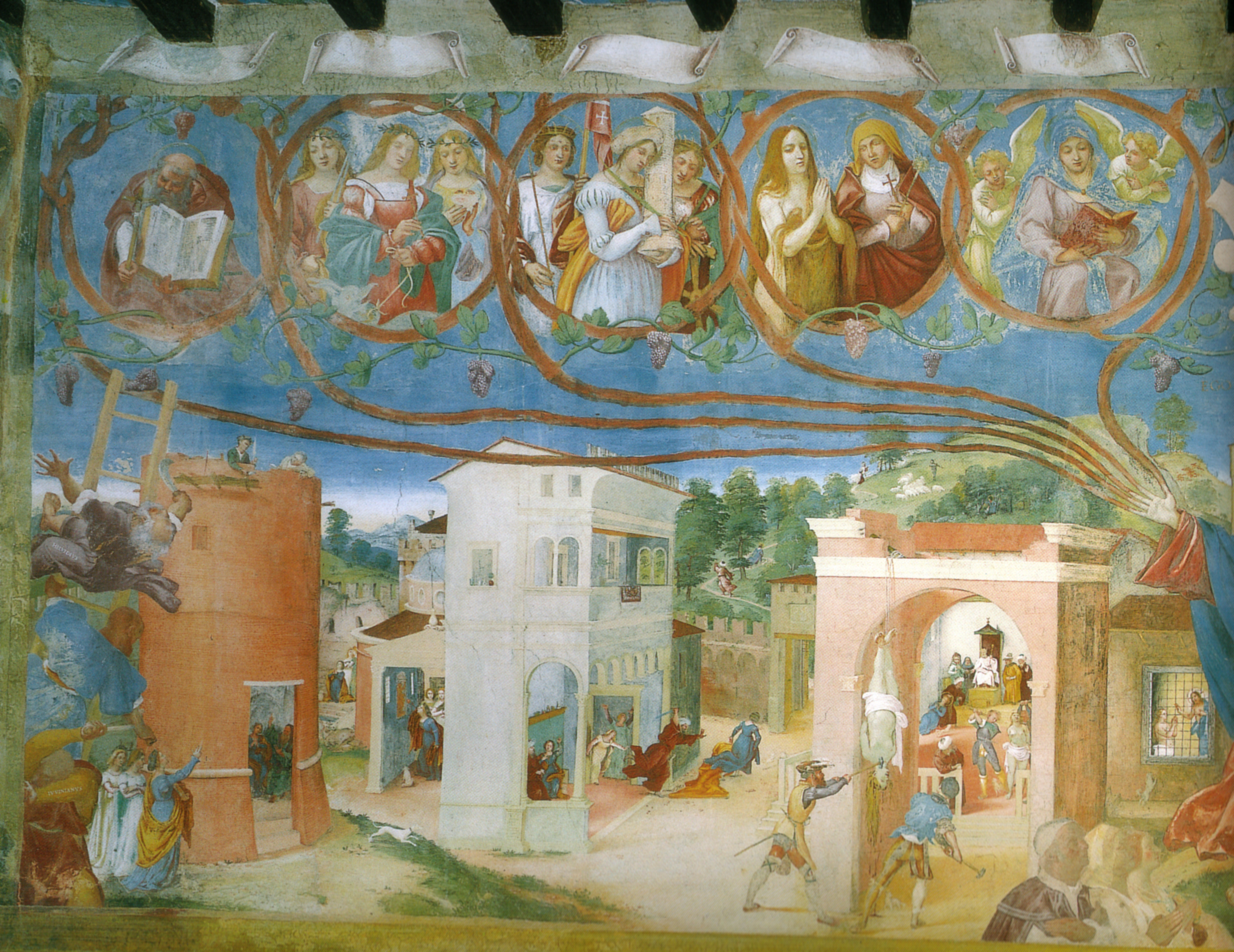
Life of Saint Barbara

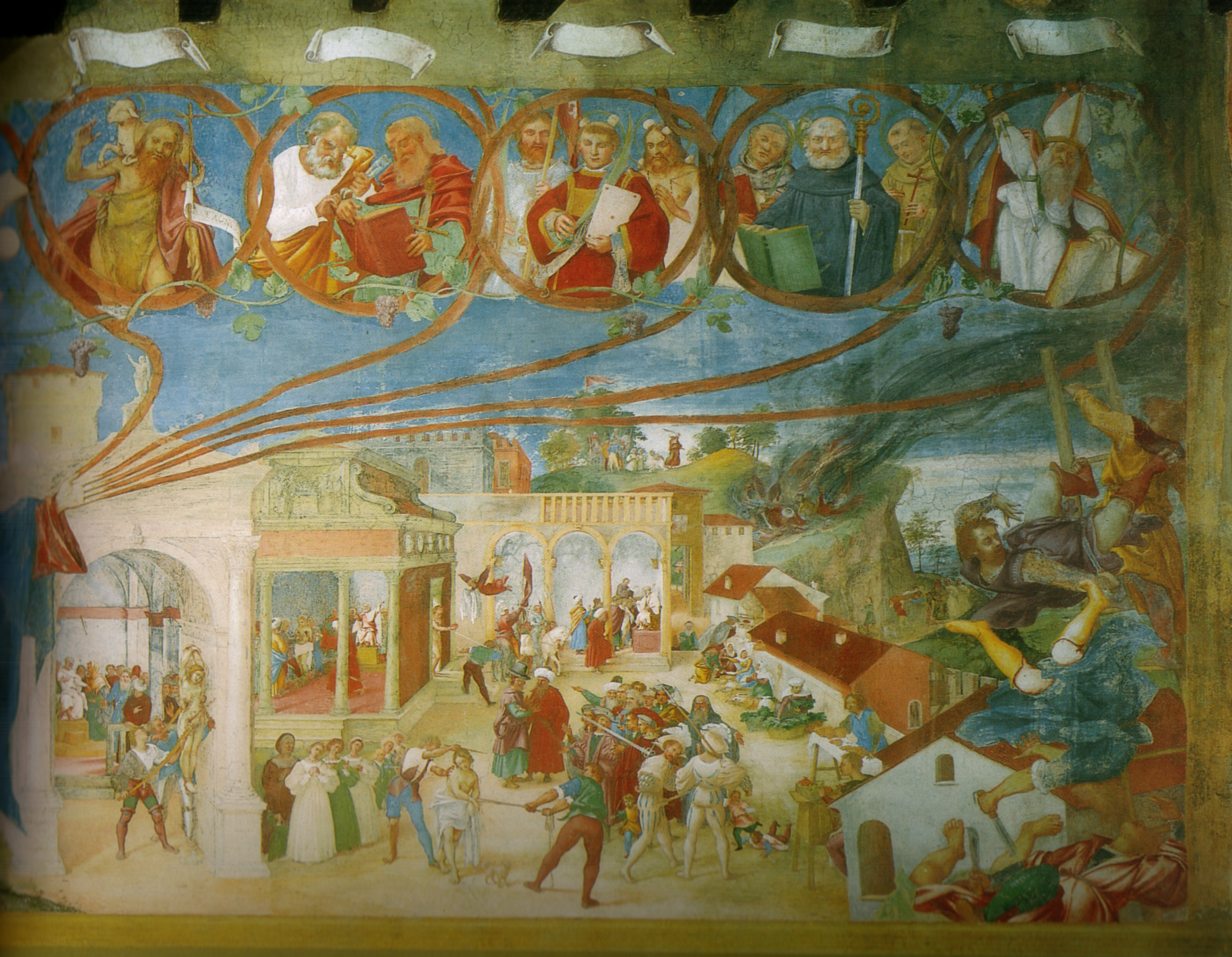
Life of Saint Barbara

Either side of the figure of Christ are a series of buildings and landscapes, all showing scenes from the life of Saint Barbara, her conversion and her martyrdom under Maximian and Diocletian. They are set in city scenes such as a marketplace, giving a popular and lively feel to the storytelling. The figures are smaller than the saints in the upper register and show the saint's life as an unheroic one, a series of anecdotes, similar to works from northern Europe at that time, anti-rhetorical and anti-classical, as do the unusual colours chosen, from yellow with violet, pink with green and white with brown. This conception of scenes within an architectural setting owed much to the example of the Sacro Monte di Varallo.

At the far left we see her locked up by her father in a round tower (a typical attribute of the saint), still under construction but guarded by soldiers. At its top we see her being instructed in Christianity by a hermit, eventually leading to her baptism and rejection of pagan idols. After her return to the women's quarters, her father discovers her conversion and furiously orders her to be killed by the sword. The saint flees to the mountains and hides in the bushes, but a shepherd betrays her and drags her by the hair to the praetor, who orders her to be whipped and tortured with upside-down hammers. She is then imprisoned, but Christ visits her and heals her.

She is then brought before the praetor again, who has her hung up by the arms and tortured with torches. She is stripped and her breasts cut off, but an angel brings a white sheet to protect her modesty. She is then dragged through the city into the marketplace amidst a curious crowd. The final scene, in the background, shows her own father beheading her but then being punished by being suddenly devoured by fire.

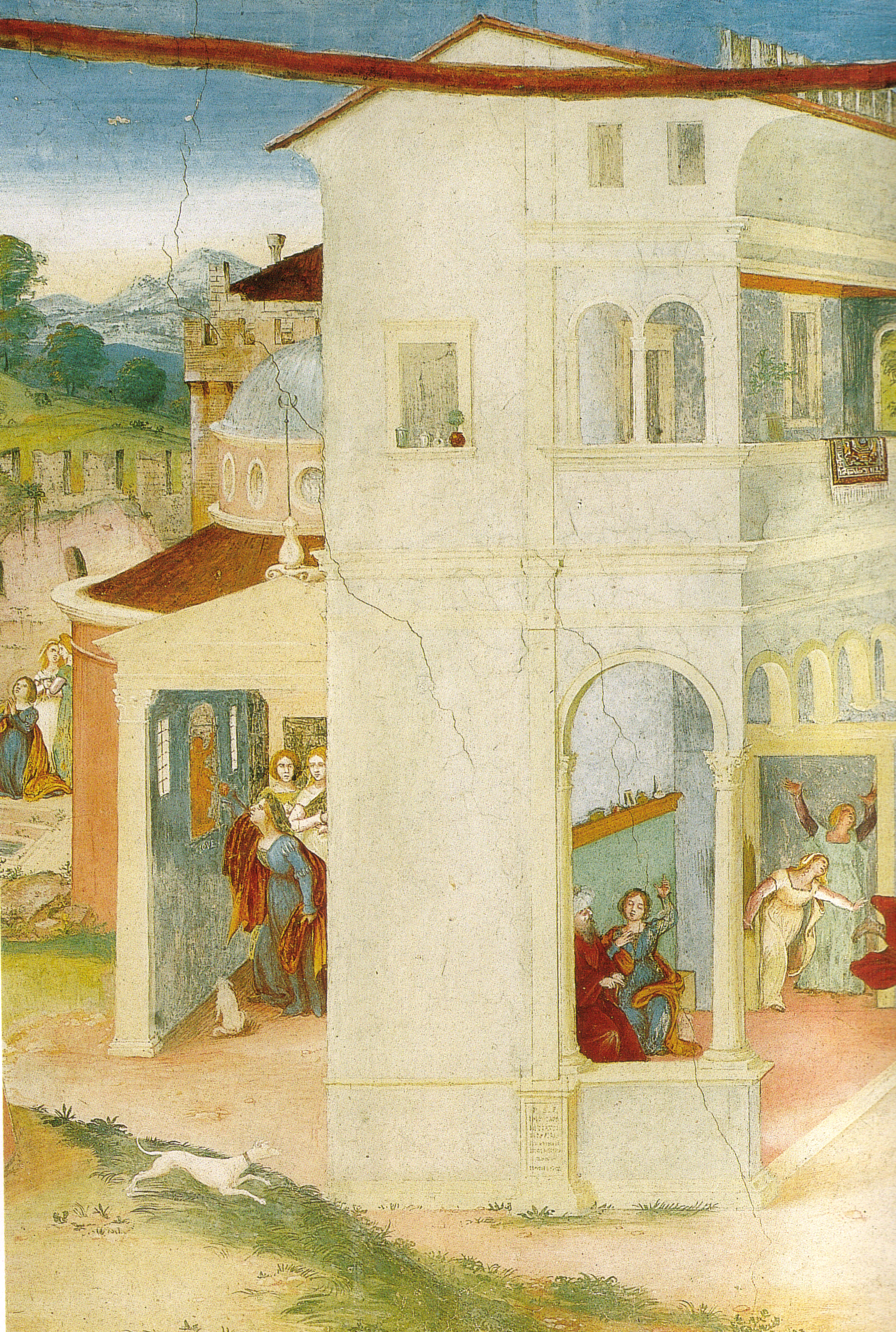
Saint Barbara's Father Discovers Her Conversion

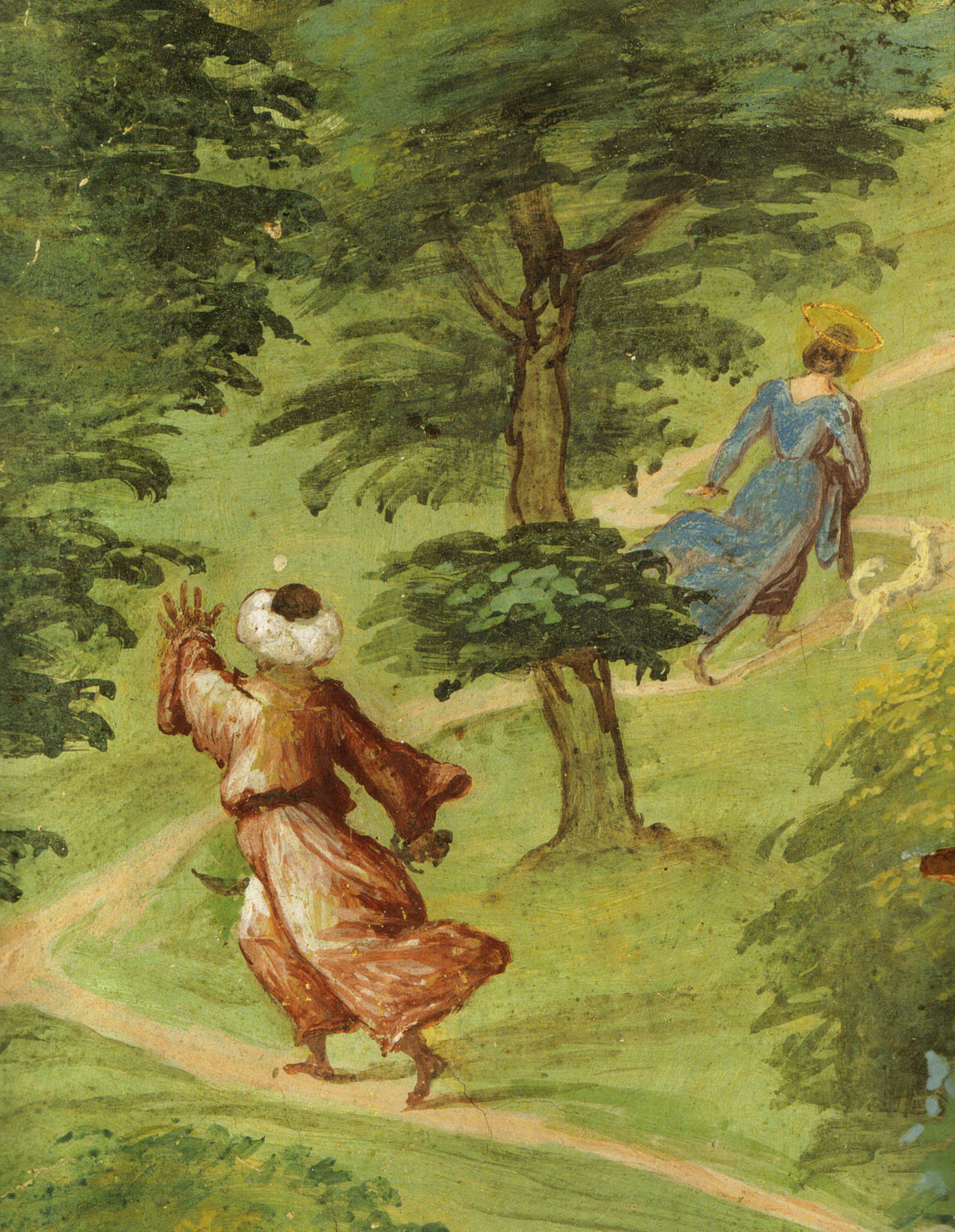
Saint Barbara Hunted through the Woods

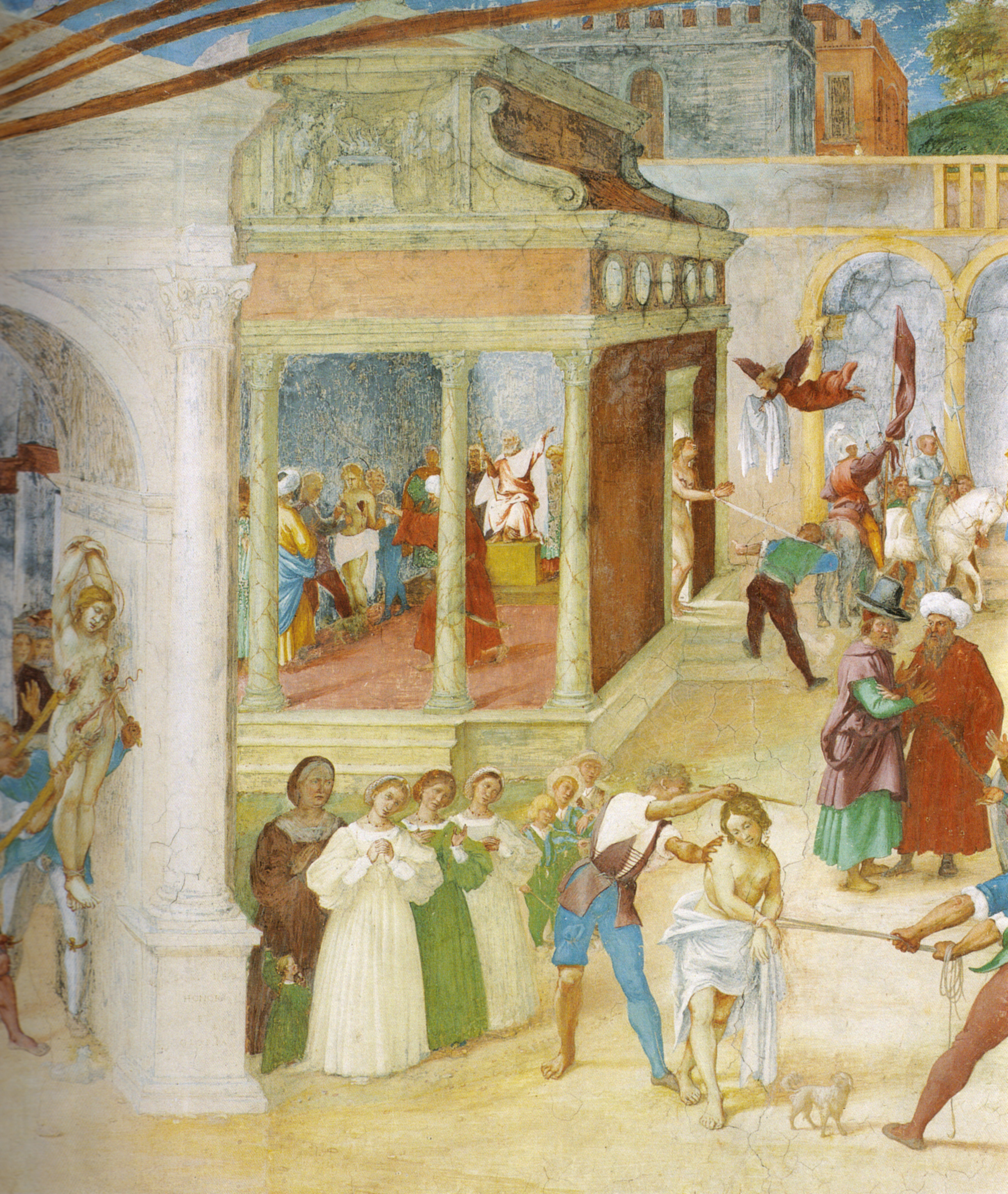
Martyrdom of Saint Barbara

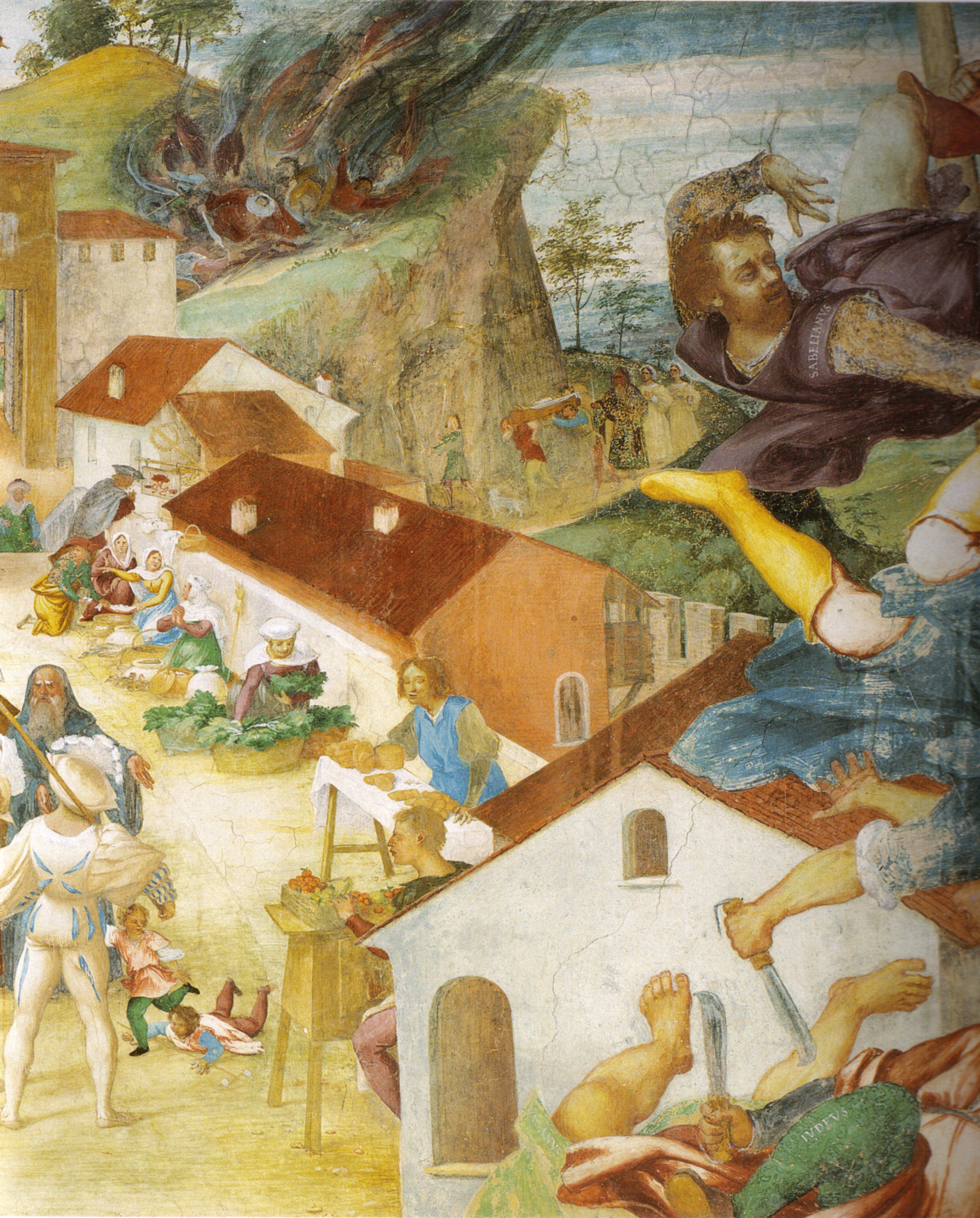
Marketplace

=== Life of Saint Brigid ===
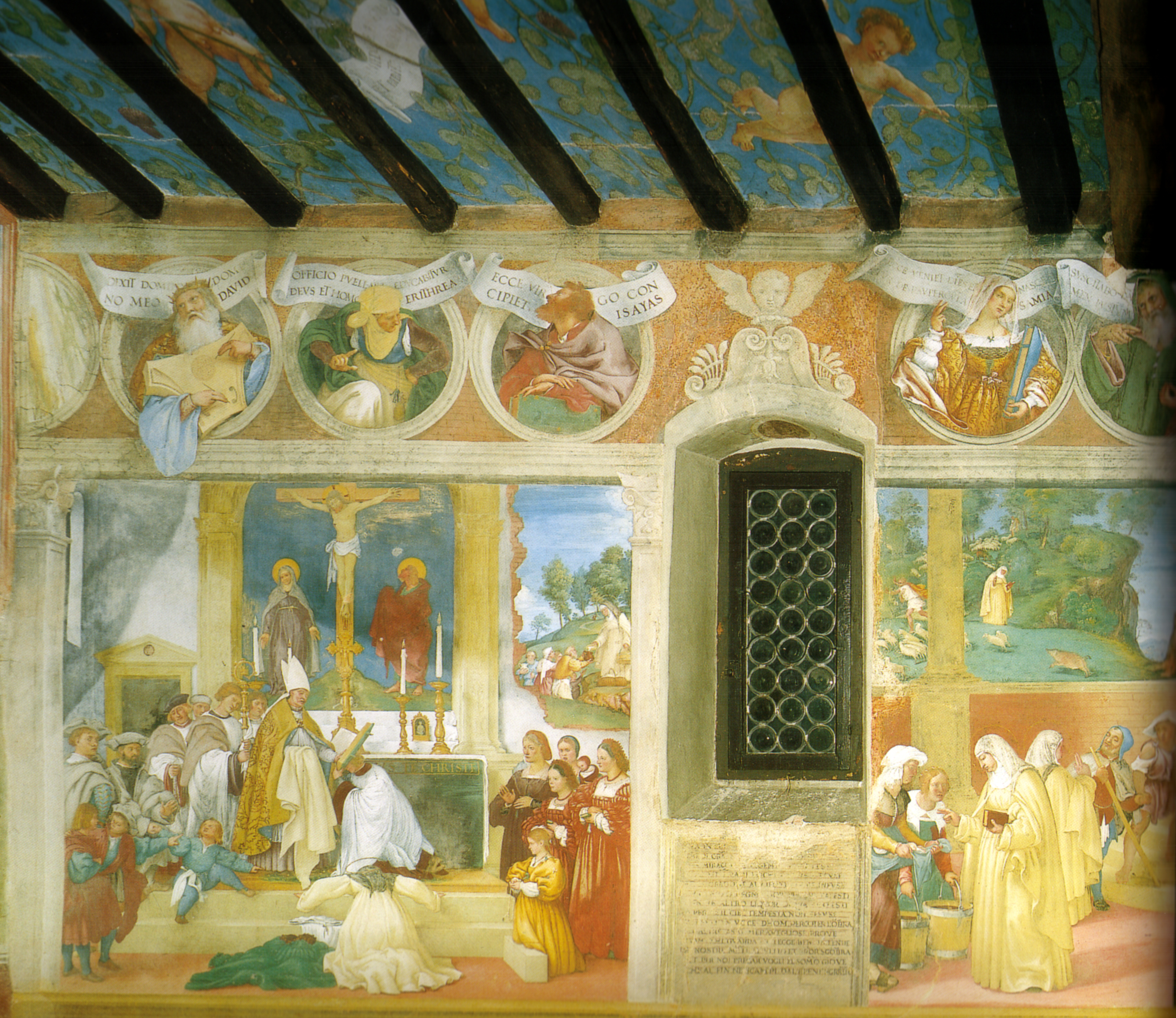
Life of Saint Brigid

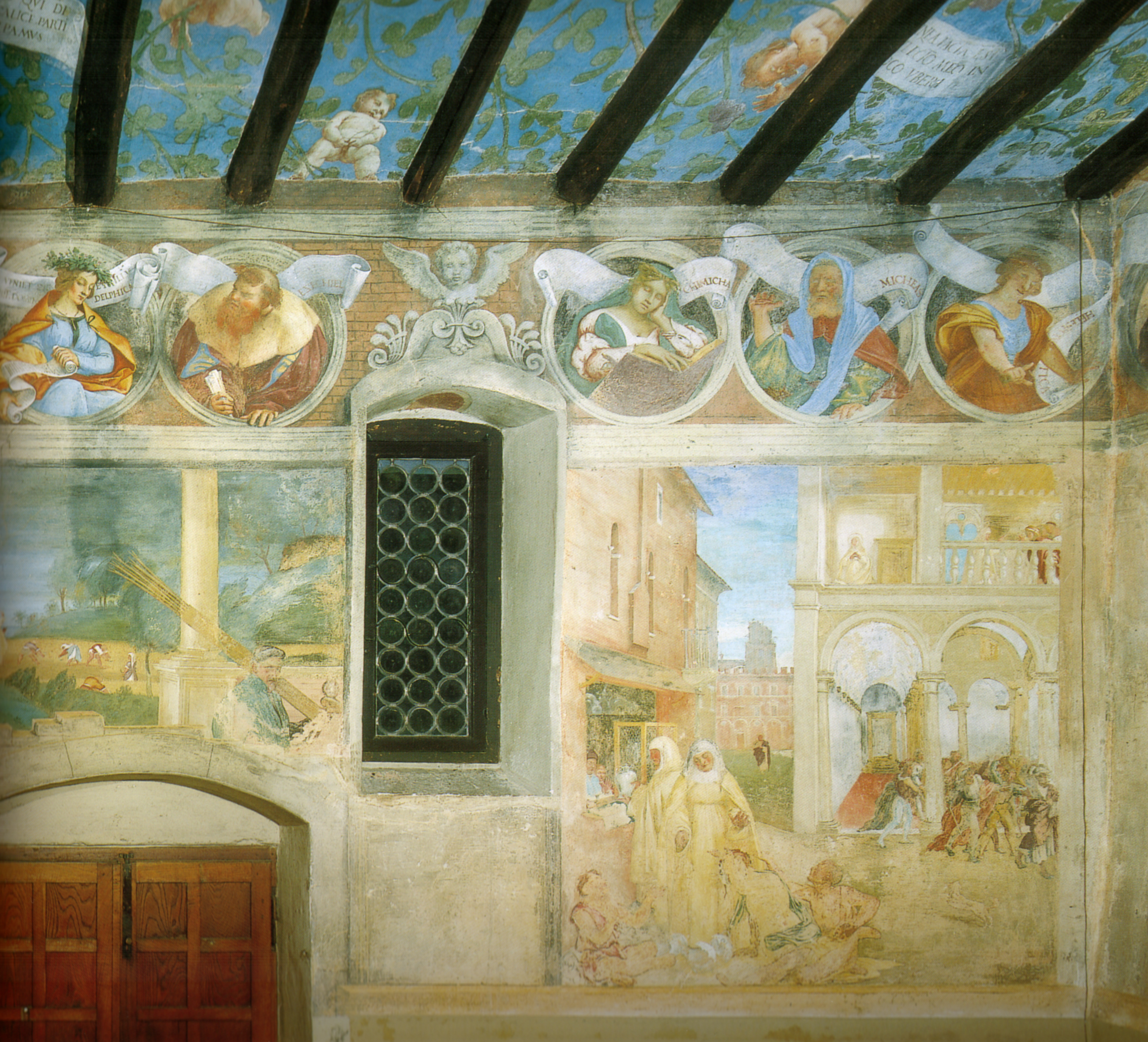
Life of Saint Brigid

The right-hand or south side shows three squares, each showing multiple scenes from the life of Brigid of Kildare, a 6th-century Irish saint. The three squares are punctuated by the entrance and two windows but are united by a continuous trompe-l'œil wall with round openings, from which appear prophets and sibyls: David, the Erythraean Sibyl, Isaiah, the Samian Sibyl, Jeremiah, the Delphic Sibyl, Ezekiel, the Cimmerian Sibyl, Micah and the Hellespontine Sibyl, each with a name label above them.

The first square opens outwards through a half-rolled-up wall and shows Brigid taking the veil, on which occasion she miraculously revived a tree. It also shows her handing out bread to the poor in the presence of another of the commissioners, Maffeo Suardi, shown with men, women and children of his family. A still life of sacred objects is shown on the altar of the small painted church in the image, perhaps a reference to Raphael's The Mass at Bolsena.

The second square shows a landscape in which the saint gives out food to the needy, turns water into beer, heals a blind man, calms a hurricane, dries up a tree and tames a boar. The third square is set in a city, showing more of Brigid's deeds, such as dividing a vase between three lepers and saving a man condemned to death by replacing him with his shadow.

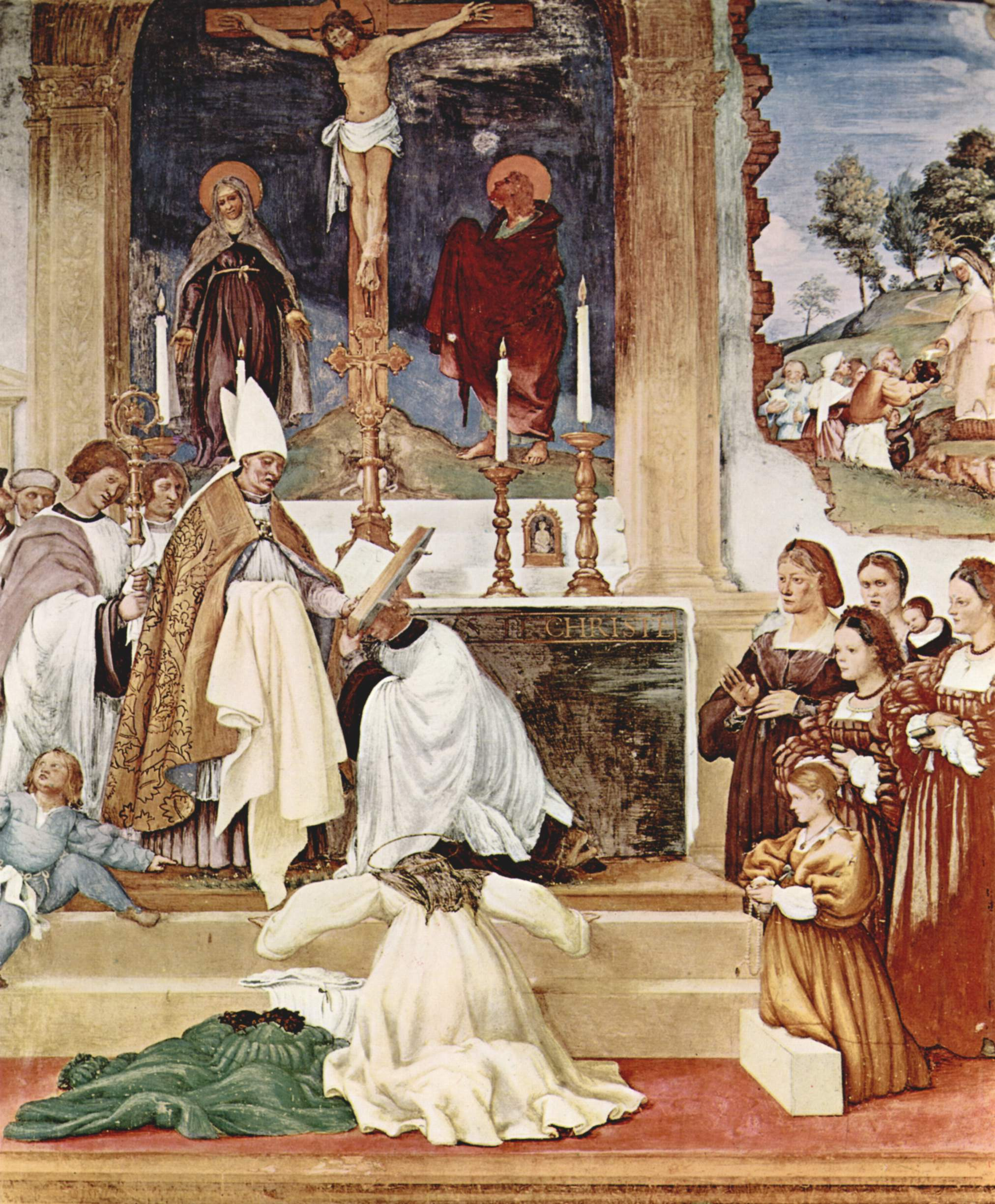
Taking the Veil

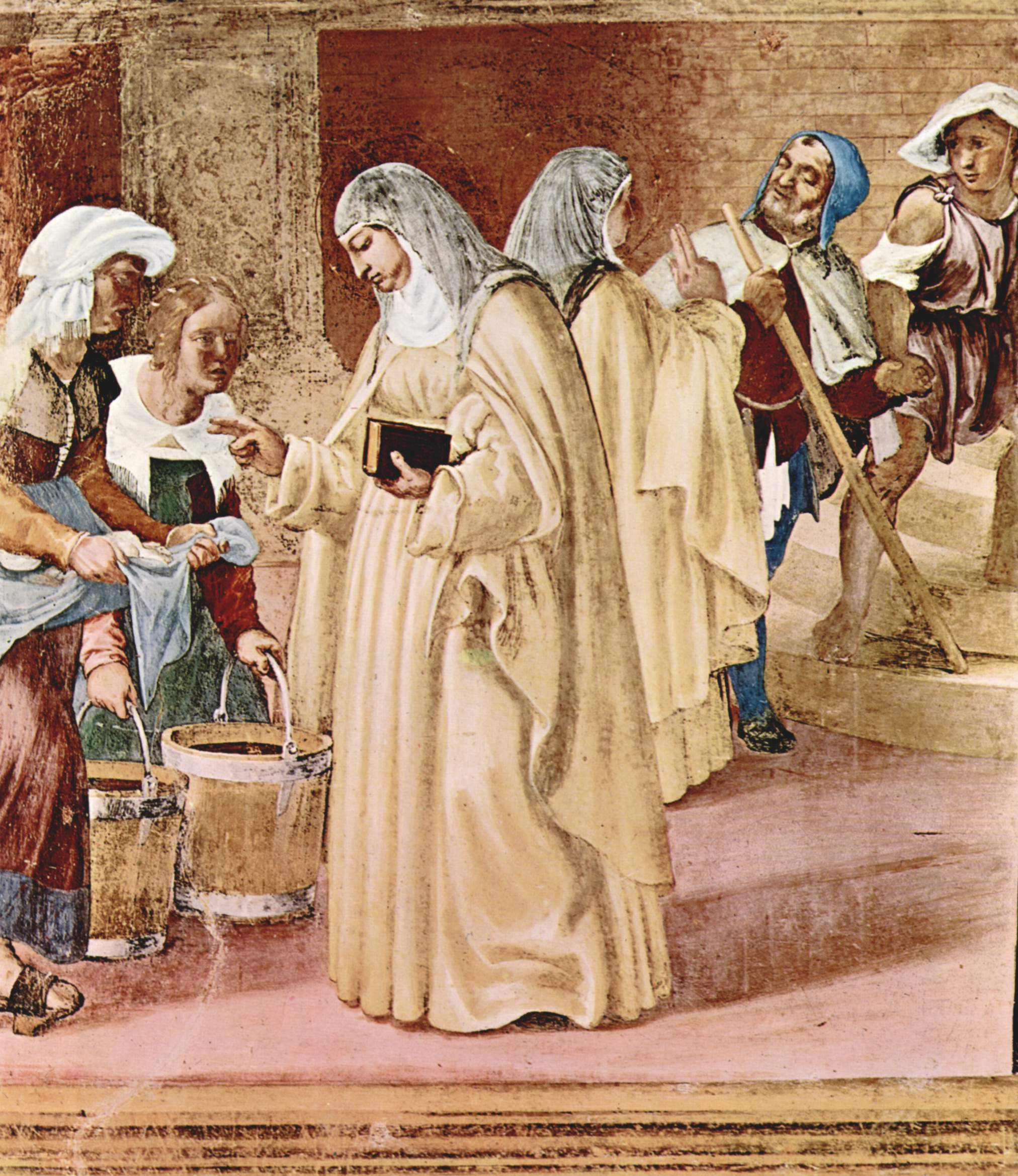
Turning Water into Beer

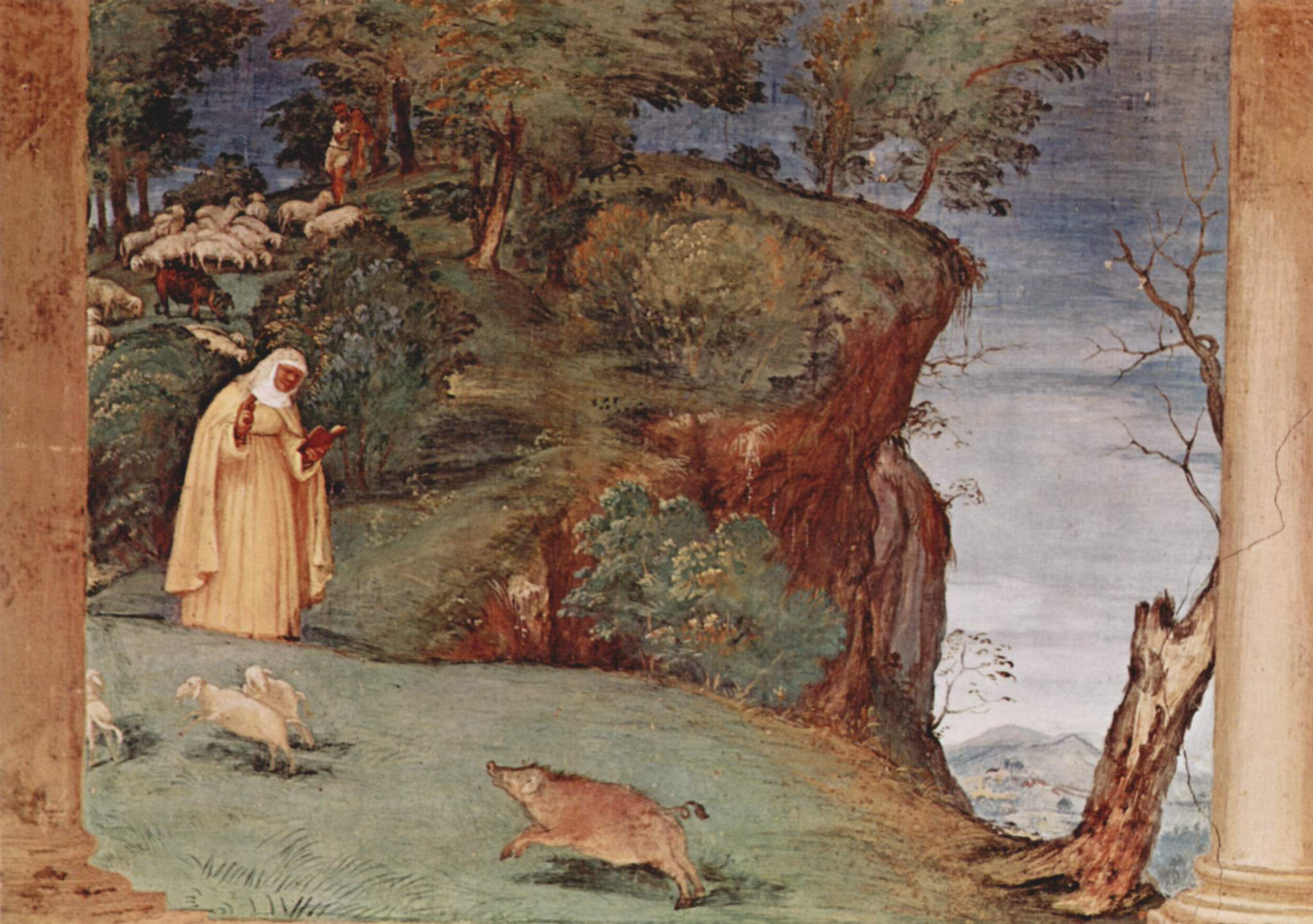
Taming the Boar

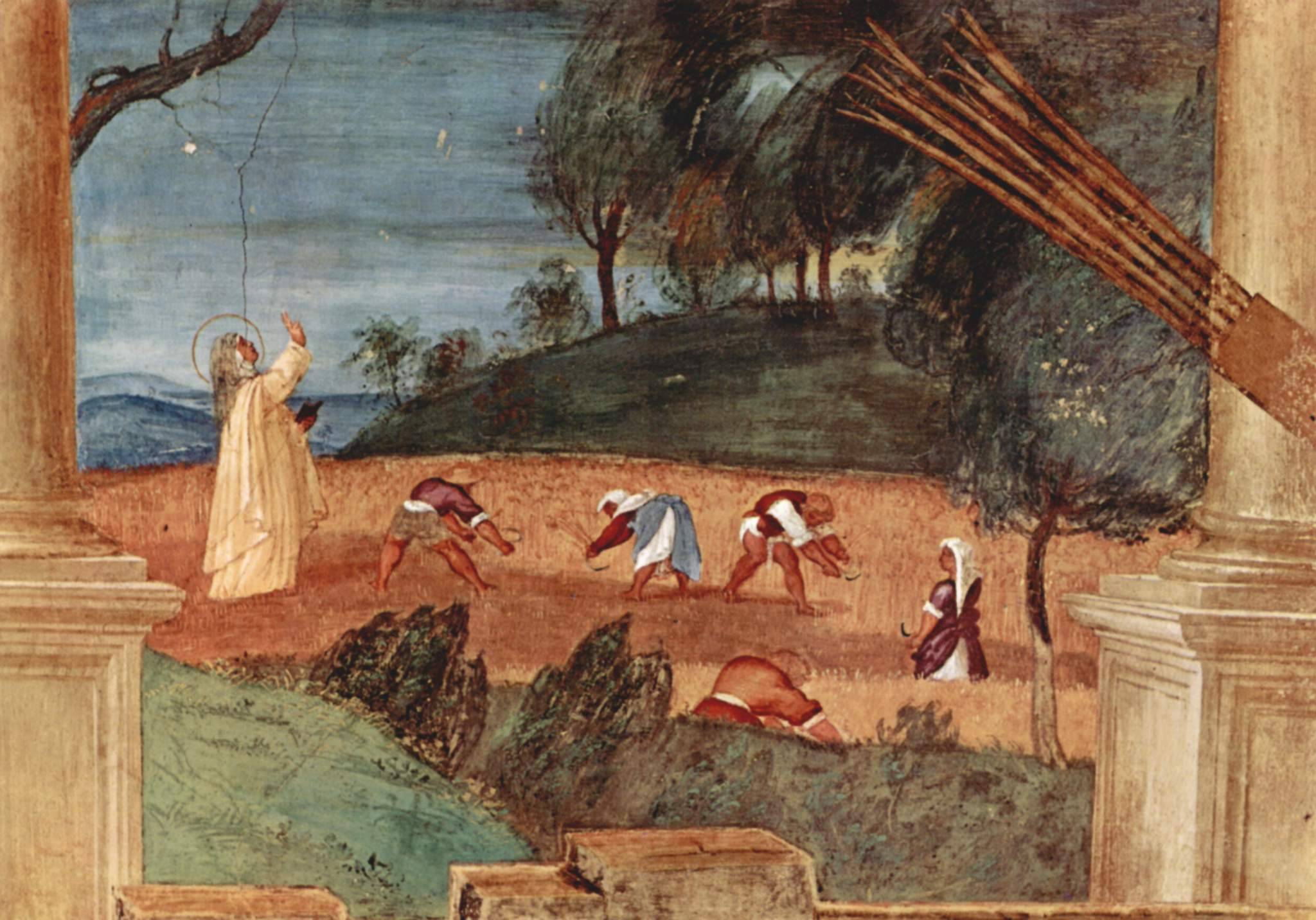
Calming the Hurricane

=== Self-portrait? ===
Over the entrance door is a half-length figure of a male bird-hunter carrying an owl and a bundle of rods on his shoulders – the rods would be used to make traps in the branches and the owl to attract birds into the traps. An ancient tradition holds this bird-hunter to be a self-portrait of Lotto hidden under a cryptic and esoteric disguise. On the ceiling is a peeing putto symbolising the saving water of baptism and of divine protection – according to alchemists of the time boys' urine had important properties as a "burning" liquid whose essence was fire. In alchemy urine was known as "lot", probably used here as a play on the artist's surname and as a reference to his ability to transform and create.

=== East wall ===
The east wall at the back shows one frame with scenes from the life of Mary Magdalene and another with scenes from the life of Catherine of Alexandria. Above them both is a continuation of the frieze of prophets and Sibyls, with this section including Habbakuk, the Tiburtine Sibyl, Zephaniah, the Phrygian Sibyl, Daniel, the Persian Sibyl and Moses, each with a still-legible cartouche of their name.

== Bibliography (in Italian) ==
- Carlo Pirovano, Lotto, Electa, Milano 2002. ISBN 88-435-7550-3
- Roberta D'Adda, Lotto, Skira, Milano 2004.
- Stefano Zuffi, Lotto, Elemond Art, Milano 1992. ISBN 88-435-4365-2
