= Phrygian Sibyl =

Priestess presiding over an oracle at Phrygia

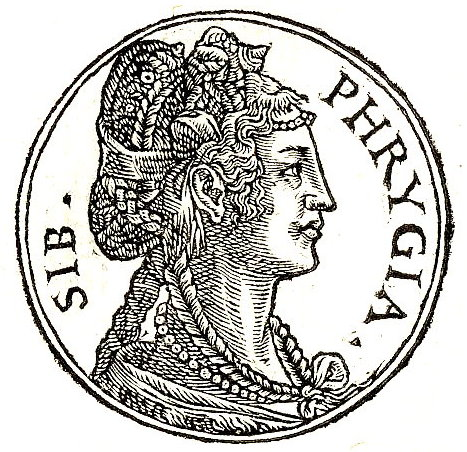
Phrygian Sibyl from Promptuarii Iconum Insigniorum

Raphael's rendering of the Phrygian Sibyl

In the extended complement of sibyls of the Gothic and Renaissance imagination, the Phrygian Sibyl was the priestess presiding over an Apollonian oracle at Phrygia, a historical kingdom in the west central part of the Anatolian highlands. She was popularly identified with Cassandra, prophetess daughter of Priam's in Homer's Iliad.

== Trio of Sibyls ==
The Phrygian sibyl appears to be one of a triplicated sibyl, with the Hellespontine Sibyl and the Erythraean Sibyl and may be a doublet of the Hellespontine Sibyl. There was indeed an oracular site in Phrygia, but a single one, at Gergitis.

== Depictions of Sibyls in Christian eschatology ==
The sibyls of Antiquity were increased to ten in Lactantius' Divine Institutions (i.6) a 4th-century work quoting from a lost work of Varro, (1st century BCE).

The word sibyl comes, via Latin, from the ancient Greek word sibylla, meaning 'prophetess'. There were several Sibyls in the ancient world, all of whom were re-employed in Christian mythology, to prefigure Christian eschatology:

When the dread trumpet resounds, the deepest earth will yawn open,
Kings will be set before the throne of God.
He will deliver the final judgement on the good and the wicked,
for the latter, fire, for the rest, eternal delights.

Such were the lines, based on Tuba mirum and composed by Aria Montano for the portrait of the "Phrygian Sibyl" (1575), one of the suite of ten copperplate engravings of the Sibyls by the Antwerp artist Philip Galle (1537–1612).
