= Marpessos =

Ancient Greek archaeological site in Turkey

- Μάρπησσος (Ancient Greek)
- Location within Turkey
- 39°52′49″N 26°31′13″E
- Type: Settlement
- Location: Zerdalilik, Çanakkale Province, Turkey
- Region: Troad

Marpessos (Ancient Greek: Μάρπησσος) was a settlement in the middle Skamander valley of the Troad region of Anatolia. The settlement's name is also spelled Μαρμησσός, Μαρμισσός, Μερμησσός in ancient sources. It was known in Classical antiquity primarily as the birthplace of the Hellespontine Sibyl Herophile. Its site has been located at Dam Dere approximately 2 km SE of the village of Zerdalilik in the Bayramiç district of Çanakkale Province in Turkey. Despite the similarity of its name and its location on Mount Ida, the settlement is apparently unrelated to the mythological figure Marpessa and her husband Idas. It should likewise not be confused with the Mount Marpessa on Paros.

== History ==
Several sources whose information derives from the 4th century BCE philosopher Heraclides Ponticus (see below) refer to Marpessos as a village (Latin vicus, Ancient Greek κώμη) in the territory of Gergis. Demetrius of Scepsis (as preserved by Pausanias: see below) refers to it as a former polis which in his day (the mid-2nd century BCE) was reduced to a population of 60 inhabitants. It is unlikely that Marpessos was ever an independent polis, and so here the word is probably being used in the sense of 'town, urban settlement'. Gergis advertised its connection to the Sibyl by displaying her head on its coinage in the 4th and 3rd century BCE. Marpessos probably became part of the territory of Ilion when Gergis was incorporated into Ilion after the Treaty of Apamea in 188 BCE.

== The Sibyl at Marpessos ==
There are two distinct traditions concerning the Sibyl of Marpessos. The first originates with the Peripatetic philosopher Heraclides Ponticus (ca. 390 - ca. 310 BCE) and is preserved in a series of sources from Late Antiquity and the early and middle Byzantine periods which list the ten Sibyls as set out by the Roman grammarian Varro. In this tradition, the Sibyl (here termed the Hellespontine Sibyl) is said to have been born in the village of Marmessos in the Troad in the time of Solon and Cyrus (early 6th century BCE).

The second tradition originates with Demetrius of Scepsis, a grammarian who wrote on Homer and whose hometown was less than 18 km from the site of Marpessos. His account is primarily preserved in the work of the 2nd century CE geographer Pausanias, and it is difficult to tell to what extent the well-traveled Pausanias (a native of Lydia) supplemented Demetrios' account with his own personal experience. The detailed narrative which Pausanias preserves relates that the Sibyl was born at Marpessos prior to the Trojan War and that her mother was a nymph from Mount Ida and her father a mortal. Demetrios gleaned this information from one of her oracles which he preserves:

εἰμὶ δ᾽ ἐγὼ γεγαυῖα μέσον θνητοῦ τε θεᾶς τε,
νύμφης δ᾽ ἀθανάτης, πατρὸς δ᾽ αὖ κητοφάγοιο,
μητρόθεν Ἰδογενής, πατρὶς δέ μοί ἐστιν ἐρυθρή
Μάρπησσος, μητρὸς ἱερή, ποταμός τ᾽ Ἀιδωνεύς.

I am by birth half mortal, half divine;
An immortal nymph was my mother, my father an eater of corn;
On my mother's side of Idaean birth, but my fatherland was red
Marpessos, sacred to the Mother, and the river Aidoneus.

The reference to Marpessos being "sacred to the Mother" indicates that there was a cult of Cybele at the settlement, a goddess traditionally thought to have resided on Mount Ida. This passage, with its references to Mount Ida, the red soil of Marpessos, and the river Aidoneus, has also allowed scholars to locate the ancient remains of Marpessos. Two important divergences from the Heraclides tradition are, firstly, that she is thought to have lived before the Trojan Wars, not in the early 6th century BCE and, secondly, that she is named Herophile, which in the Heraclides tradition is instead the name attributed to the Cumaean Sibyl in Italy. Demetrios also relates that the inhabitants of Alexandria Troas had a local tradition in which they claimed that towards the end of her life Herophile had become a neokoros (temple warden) at the sanctuary of Apollo Smintheus in the territory of Alexandria Troas, and displayed a funerary epitaph for her to prove that she had been buried in the sanctuary:

ἅδ᾽ ἐγὼ ἁ Φοίβοιο σαφηγορίς εἰμι Σίβυλλα
τῷδ᾽ ὑπὸ λαϊνέῳ σάματι κευθομένα,
παρθένος αὐδάεσσα τὸ πρίν, νῦν δ᾽ αἰὲν ἄναυδος,
μοίρᾳ ὑπὸ στιβαρᾷ τάνδε λαχοῦσα πέδαν.
ἀλλὰ πέλας Νύμφαισι καὶ Ἑρμῇ τῷδ᾽ ὑπόκειμαι,
μοῖραν ἔχοισα κάτω τᾶς τότ᾽ ἀνακτορίας.

Here I am, the plain-speaking Sibyl of Phoebus,
Hidden beneath this stone tomb.
A maiden once gifted with voice, but now for ever voiceless,
By hard fate doomed to this fetter.
But I am buried near the nymphs and this Hermes,
Enjoying in the world below a part of the kingdom I had then.

Demetrios also relates that the Erythraeans instead claimed that Herophile was born to a nymph and a mortal not on Mount Ida, but in a cave in their own city's territory. According to Demetrios, the Erythraeans suppressed the last line of the oracle which mentions Marpessos and the river Aidoneus, so that the third line of the epigram would instead read: "On my mother's side of Idaean birth, but my fatherland was Erythre (i.e. the proper noun Erythrae rather than the adjective 'red')". We cannot tell whether the Erythraeans really did excise a line from the oracle, or whether Demetrios instead added one, since being able to claim possession of an oracle was a matter of great prestige for Greek poleis, and so both parties had a vested interest in manipulating the historical record.

== Bibliography ==
- R. Kiepert, 'Gergis und Marpessos in der Troas' Klio 9 (1909) 10-13.
- J. M. Cook, The Troad: An Archaeological and Topographical Study (Oxford, 1973) 280-2.
- S. Mitchell, 'Pre-Hellenistic settlements not attested as poleis' in M.H. Hansen and T.H. Nielsen (eds.), An Inventory of Archaic and Classical Poleis (Oxford, 2004) 1001-2.
