= Delphic Sibyl =

Prophetess of classical antiquity

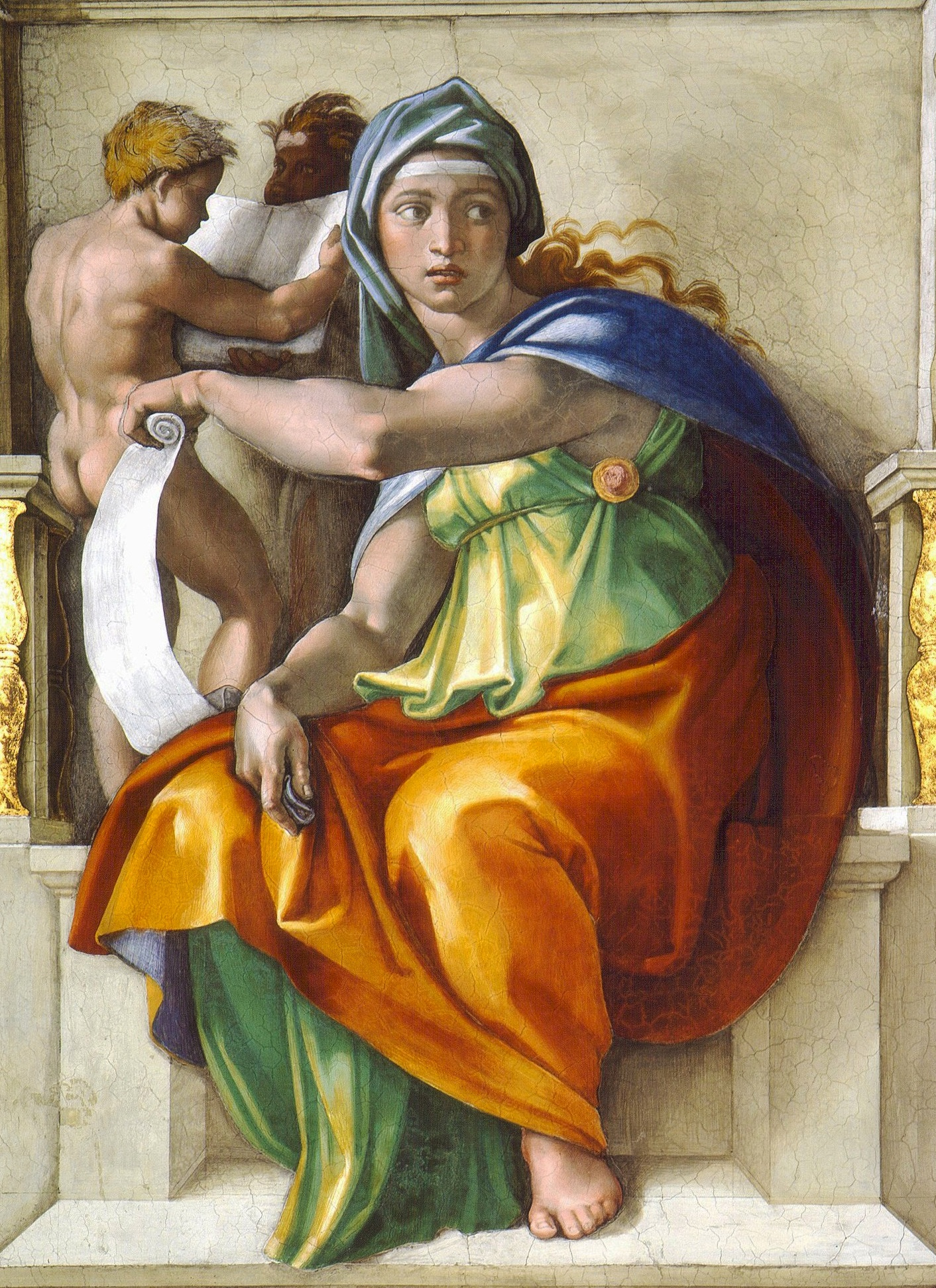
Michelangelo's depiction of the Delphic Sibyl on the Sistine Chapel ceiling

The Delphic Sibyl was a prophetess associated with early religious practices in Ancient Greece and is said to have been venerated from before the Trojan Wars as an important oracle. At that time Delphi was a place of worship for Gaia, the mother goddess connected with fertility rituals that are thought to have existed throughout the ancient Mediterranean world. As needed to maintain the religious tradition, the role of sibyl would pass to another priestess at each site.

The Delphic Sibyl was dated to as early as the eleventh century BC by Pausanias in his writings from the second century AD about local traditions. This Sibyl would have predated Pythia, the oracle and priestess of Apollo during the period of the religious traditions of Archaic Greece, who is dated to the eighth century BC.

Throughout the ancient Mediterranean world, there were several prophetic women called Sibyls who were associated with religious centers. The Sibyl of Dodona, was dated to the second millennium BC by Herodotus. A Sibyl famous among the Greek colonists living near Naples, Italy, was located at Cumae and she had a strong influence upon the Romans. Delphi was well known in these ancient times and was a location at which the Sibyls were venerated.

Pausanias claimed that this Sibyl was "born between man and goddess, daughter of sea monsters and an immortal nymph". He said that the Sibyl came from the Troad to Delphi before the Trojan War, "in wrath with her brother Apollo", lingered for a time at Samos, visited Claros and Delos, and died in the Troad after surviving nine generations of humans. As religious traditions changed and the cult of Apollo gained prominence at Delphi, it was said that after her "death", she became a wandering voice who still brought tidings of the future to the ears of humans, while wrapped in dark riddles.

The Delphic Sibyl experienced a revival in cultural depictions during the Renaissance in the fifteenth century AD and appears prominently among the frescoes of Michelangelo's Sistine Chapel ceiling. This revival is thought to be due to a prophecy by the Delphic Sibyl that is believed to foreshadow the coming of Christ. In her prophecy a savior is prophesied who will be misjudged and shamed by unbelievers with a crown of thorns. Michelangelo's rendering of the Delphic Sibyl is located opposite the depiction of the drunkenness of Noah, which also is said to have foreshadowed the shaming of Christ.

Male prophets, called Bakis, also existed in the Graeco-Roman world; the most famous Bakis was at Boeotia.

== See also ==
- Cumaean Sibyl
- Erythraean Sibyl
- Pythia
