= Sibylline Oracles =

Collection of oracular utterances

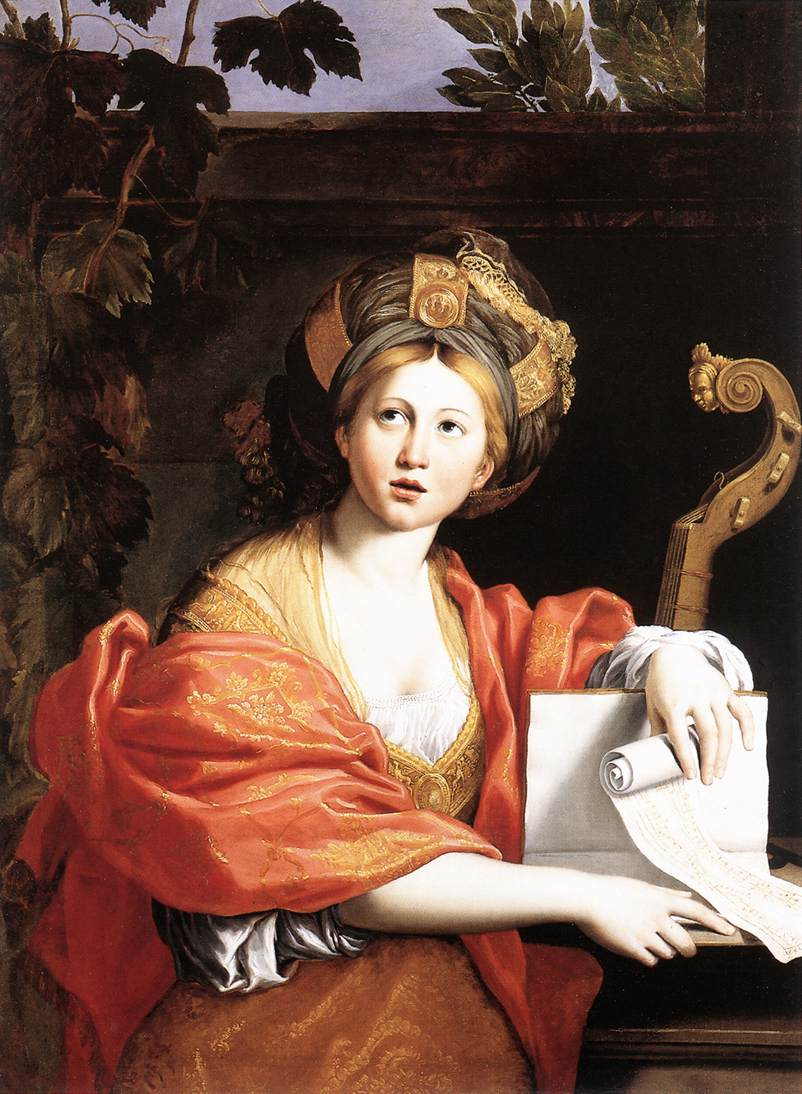
A Sibyl, by Domenichino (c. 1616–17)

The Sibylline Oracles (Latin: Oracula Sibyllina) are a collection of oracular utterances written in Greek hexameters ascribed to the Sibyls, prophetesses who uttered divine revelations in a frenzied state. Fourteen books and eight fragments of Sibylline Oracles survive, in an edition of the 6th or 7th century AD. They are not to be confused with the original Sibylline Books of the ancient Etruscans and Romans which were burned by order of the Roman general Flavius Stilicho in the 4th century AD. Instead, the text is an "odd pastiche" of Hellenistic and Roman mythology interspersed with Jewish, Gnostic and early Christian writings and thinly veiled references to historical figures such as Alexander the Great and Cleopatra, as well as many allusions to the events of the later Roman Empire, often portraying Rome in a negative light.

The Sibylline Oracles are a valuable source for information about classical mythology and early first millennium Gnostic, Hellenistic Jewish and Christian beliefs. Some apocalyptic passages scattered throughout seem to foreshadow themes of the Book of Revelation and other apocalyptic literature. The oracles have undergone extensive editing, re-writing, and redaction as they came to be exploited in wider circles.

One passage has an acrostic, spelling out a Christian code-phrase with the first letters of successive lines.

== Introduction ==
The Sibylline Oracles in their existing form are a chaotic medley. They consist of 12 books (or 14) of various authorship, date, and religious conception. The final arrangement, thought to be due to an unknown editor of the 6th century AD (Alexandre), does not determine identity of authorship, time, or religious belief; many of the books are merely arbitrary groupings of unrelated fragments.

These oracles were anonymous in origin and as such were apt to modification and enlargement at pleasure by Hellenistic Jews and by Christians for missionary purposes. Celsus called Christians Σιβυλλισται ('sibyl-mongers' or 'believers in sibyls') because of prophecies preached among them, especially those in the book of Revelation. The preservation of the entire collection is due to Christian writers.

== Sources for the Sibylline texts ==
The oldest of the surviving Sibylline oracles seem to be books 3–5, which were composed partly by Jews in Alexandria. The third oracle seems to have been composed in the reign of Ptolemy VI Philometor. Books 1–2 may have been written by Christians, though again there may have been a Jewish original that was adapted to Christian purposes.

All the oracles seem to have undergone later revision, enrichment, and adaptation by editors and authors of different religions, who added similar texts, all in the interests of their respective religions. Some have suggested that the surviving texts may include some fragments or remnants of the Sibylline Books with a legendary provenance from the Cumaean Sibyl, which had been kept in temples in Rome. The original oracular books, kept in Rome, were accidentally destroyed in a fire in 83 BC, which resulted in an attempt in 76 BC to recollect them when the Roman senate sent envoys throughout the world to discover copies. This official copy existed until at least AD 405, but little is known of their contents.

That the use of the Sibylline Oracles was not always exclusive to Christians is shown by an extract from Book III concerning the Tower of Babel as quoted by the Jewish historian Flavius Josephus, in the late 1st century AD.

The Christian apologist Athenagoras of Athens, writing A Plea for the Christians to Marcus Aurelius in c. 176 AD, quoted the same section of the extant Oracles verbatim, in the midst of a lengthy series of classical and pagan references including Homer and Hesiod, and stated several times that all these works should already be familiar to the Roman Emperor.

Varro enumerated ten Sibyls: Persian, Libyan, Delphic, Cimmerian, Erythrean, Samian, Cumean, Hellospontian, Phrygian, and Tiburtine. The list omits the Hebrew, Chaldean, and Egyptian Sibyls. The Suda repeats this list but identifies the Persian Sibyl with the Hebrew.

The Sibyls themselves, and the so-called Sibylline oracles, were often referred to by other early Church fathers; Theophilus, Bishop of Antioch (c. 180), Clement of Alexandria (c. 200), Lactantius (c. 305), and Augustine (c. 400), all knew various versions of the pseudo-Sibylline collections, quoted them or referred to them in paraphrase as Lactantius:

"The Erythraean Sibyl" in the beginning of her song, which she commenced by the help of the Most High God, proclaims the Son of God as leader and commander of all in these verses:

All-nourishing Creator, who in all
Sweet breath implanted, and made God the guide of all.

Some fragmentary verses that do not appear in the collections that survive are only known because they were quoted by a Church Father. Justin Martyr (c. 150), if he is truly the author of the Exhortation to the Greeks, gives such a circumstantial account of the Cumaean Sibyl that the Address is quoted here at the Cumaean Sibyl's entry. The Catholic Encyclopedia states, "Through the decline and disappearance of paganism, however, interest in them gradually diminished and they ceased to be widely read or circulated, though they were known and used during the Middle Ages in both the East and the West." [Need edition] Thus, a student may find echoes of their imagery and style in much early medieval literature.

These books, in spite of their pagan content, have sometimes been described as part of the Pseudepigrapha. They do not appear in the canonical lists of any Church.

== Manuscripts and editions ==
The text has been transmitted in fourteen "books", preserved in two distinct manuscript traditions, one containing books 1–8, the other 9–14. However, "book 9" consists of material from books 1–8 and "book 10" is identical to "book 4", so that the edition by Collins (1983) contains only books 1–8 and 11–14. The main manuscripts date to the 14th to 16th centuries (Collins 1983:321):

- Group φ: books 1–8 with an anonymous prologue
  - Z: Codex Hierosolymitanus Sabaiticus 419 (late 14th century)
  - A: Codex Vindobonensis hist gr. XCVI 6 (15th century)
  - P: Codex Monacensis 351 (15th century)
  - B: Codex Bodleianus Baroccianus 103 (late 15th century)
  - S: Codex Scorialensis II Σ 7 (late 15th century)
  - D: Codex Vallicellianus gr. 46 (16th century)
- Group ψ: books 1–8, without prologue
  - F: Codex Laurentianus plut. XI 17 (15th century)
  - R: Codex Parisinus 2851 (late 15th century)
  - L: Codex Parisinus 2850 (1475)
  - T: Codex Toletanus Cat 88.44 (c. 1500)
- Group Ω: books 9–14
  - M: Codices Ambrosiani E64 sup. (15th century)
  - Q: Codex Vaticanus 1120 (14th century)
  - V: Codex Vaticanus 743 (14th century)
  - H: Codex Monacensis gr. 312 (1541)

To this may be added the ample quotations found in the writings of the early Church Fathers.

In 1545 Xystus Betuleius (Sixt Birck of Augsburg) published at Basel an edition based on manuscript P, and the next year a version set in Latin verse appeared. Better manuscripts were used by Johannes Opsopaeus, whose edition appeared at Paris in 1599. Later editions include those by Servaas Galle (Servatius: Amsterdam 1689) and by Andrea Gallandi in his Bibliotheca Veterum Patrum (Venice, 1765, 1788).

Books 11–14 were edited only in the 19th century. In 1817 Angelo Mai edited a further book, from a manuscript in the Biblioteca Ambrosiana at Milan (Codex Ambrosianus) and later he discovered four more books, in the Vatican Library, none of which were continuations of the eight previously printed, but an independent collection. These are numbered XI to XIV in later editions. Several fragments of oracles taken from the works of Theophilus and Lactantius, printed in the later editions, show that even more Sibylline oracles formerly existed. In the course of the 19th century, better texts also became available for the parts previously published.

== Contents ==
The Sibylline Oracles are written in hexameter.

The 1913 Catholic Encyclopedia characterizes the Oracles as an eclectic mixture of texts of unclear origin and largely middling quality. Its speculations on the most likely provenances of the various books are as follows:

- Book 1: Christian revision of Jewish original
- Book 2: Christian revision of Jewish original
- Book 4: the oldest text; completely Jewish
- Book 5: likely Jewish, though with controversy among critics
- Book 6: Christian; likely 3rd century
- Book 7: Christian
- Book 8: first half likely 2nd century Jewish; second half Christian, likely 3rd century
- Book 11: 3rd century, Christian at least in revision
- Book 12: Christian revision of Jewish original
- Book 13: Christian, at least in revision
- Book 14: 4th century, Christian at least in revision

== See also ==
- Alexander Polyhistor
- Hebrew Sibyl
- Jewish eschatology
- Vaticinia ex eventu describes the phenomenon of pretended oracles written after the event.
- Wives aboard the Ark
