= Gergitha =

Ancient city of the Troad

Coordinates: 39°11′37″N 27°40′15″E

Gergitha (Ancient Greek: Γέργιθα) or Gergetha (Ancient Greek: Γέργεθα), also known as Gergina (Ancient Greek: Γέργινα) and Gergithus, Gergithium or Gergithion, was a town in ancient Lydia, near Stratonicea, at the sources of the Caicus River, said to have been peopled by the inhabitants of Gergis in the Troad by King Attalus of Pergamus.

Cephalon (Ancient Greek: Κεφάλων) of Gergitha, was an ancient writer.

Its site is tentatively located near Yirca, Asiatic Turkey.
