= Sibyl =

Oracles in Ancient Greece

The sibyls (Note: Ancient Greek: Σίβυλλαι, romanized: Sibyllai, pl. of Σίβυλλα, Sibylla, pronounced [sí.byl.lai, sí.byl.la].) were prophetesses or oracles in Ancient Greece.

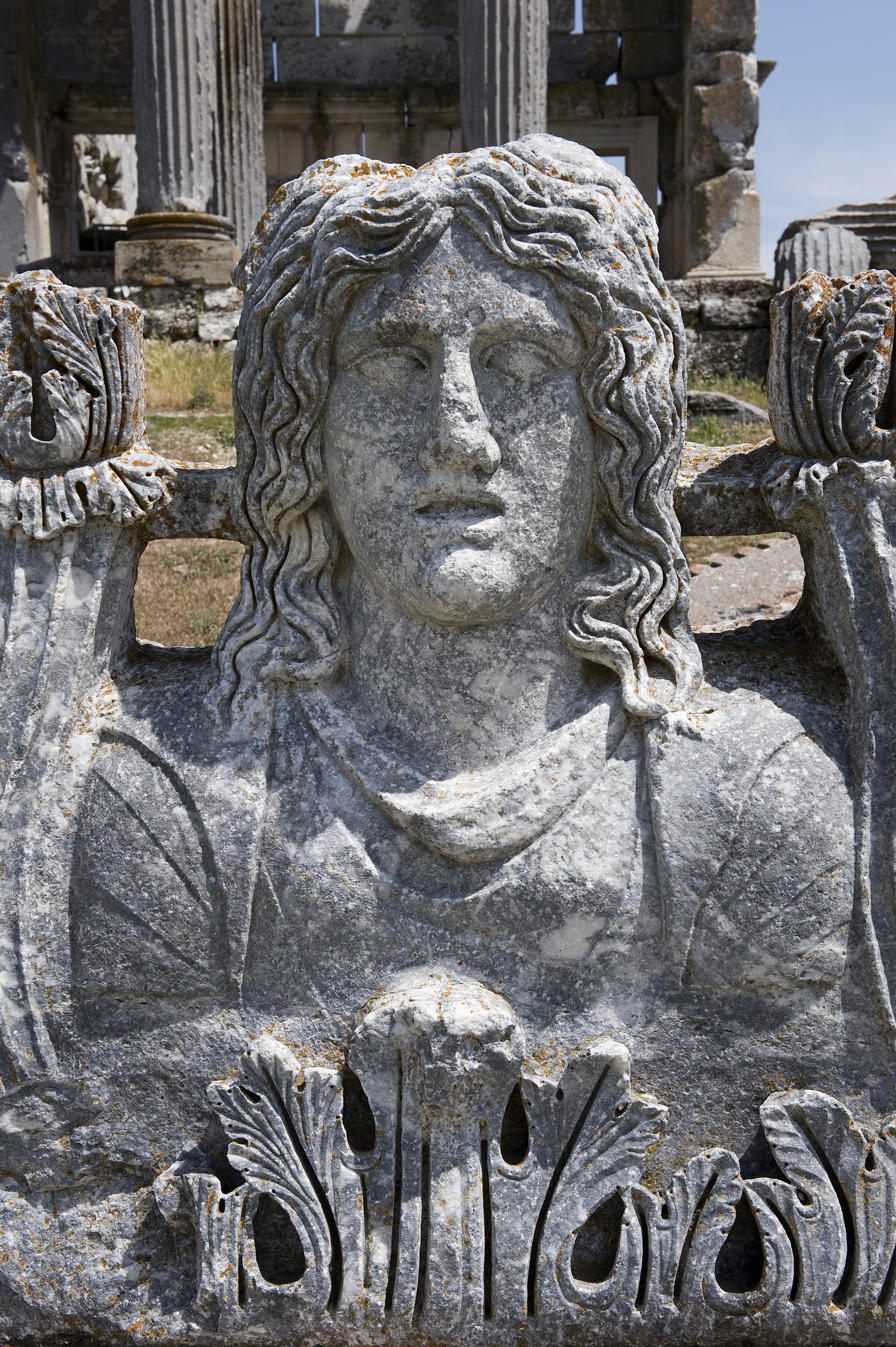
Statue in the Temple of Zeus at Aizanoi, believed to depict a sibyl

The sibyls prophesied at holy sites. A sibyl at Delphi has been dated to as early as the eleventh century BC by Pausanias when he described local traditions in his writings from the second century AD. At first, there appears to have been only a single sibyl. By the fourth century BC, there appear to have been at least three more, Phrygian, Erythraean, and Hellespontine. By the first century BC, there were at least ten sibyls, located in Greece, Italy, North Africa, and Asia Minor.

== History ==
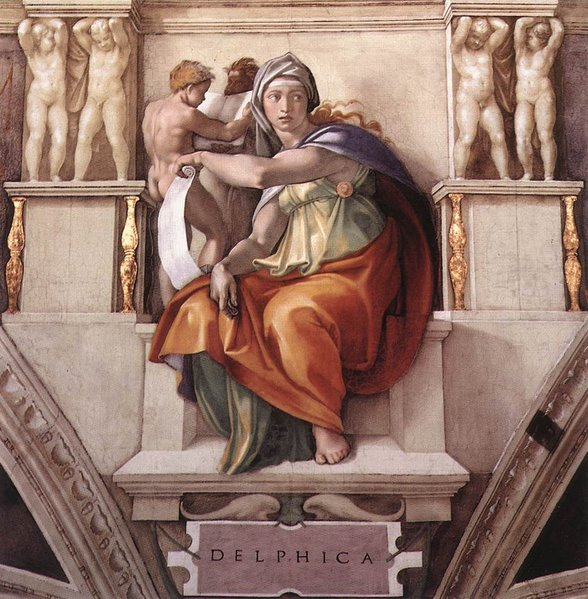
Michelangelo's Delphic Sibyl, Sistine Chapel ceiling

The English word sibyl (/ˈsɪbəl/) is from Middle English, via the Old French sibile and the Latin sibylla from the ancient Greek Σίβυλλα (Sibylla). Varro derived the name from an Aeolic sioboulla, the equivalent of Attic theobule ("divine counsel"). This etymology is not accepted in modern handbooks, which list the origin as unknown. There have been alternative proposals in nineteenth-century philology suggesting Old Italic or Semitic derivation.

The first known Greek writer to mention a sibyl is (based on the testimony of Plutarch) Heraclitus (fl. 500 BC):

The Sibyl, with frenzied mouth uttering things not to be laughed at, unadorned and unperfumed, yet reaches to a thousand years with her voice by aid of the god.

Walter Burkert observes that "frenzied women from whose lips the god speaks" are recorded very much earlier in the Near East, as in Mari in the second millennium and in Assyria in the first millennium".

Until the literary elaborations of Roman writers, sibyls were not identified by a personal name, but by names that refer to the location of their temenos, or shrine.

In Pausanias, Description of Greece, the first sibyl at Delphi mentioned ("the former" [earlier]) was of great antiquity, and was thought, according to Pausanias, to have been given the name "sibyl" by the Libyans. Sir James Frazer calls the text defective.

The second sibyl referred to by Pausanias, and named "Herophile", seems to have been based ultimately in Samos, but visited other shrines, at Clarus, Delos, and Delphi and sang there, but that at the same time, Delphi had its own sibyl.

James Frazer writes, in his translation and commentary on Pausanias, that only two of the Greek sibyls were historical: Herophile of Erythrae, who is thought to have lived in the eighth century BC, and Phyto of Samos who lived somewhat later. He observes that the Greeks at first seemed to have known only one sibyl, and instances Heraclides Ponticus as the first ancient writer to distinguish several sibyls: Heraclides names at least three sibyls, the Phrygian, the Erythraean, and the Hellespontine. The scholar David S. Potter writes, "In the late fifth century BC it does appear that 'Sibylla' was the name given to a single inspired prophetess".

Like Heraclitus, Plato speaks of only one sibyl, but in course of time the number increased to nine, with a tenth, the Tiburtine Sibyl, probably Etruscan in origin, added by the Romans. According to Lactantius' Divine Institutions (Book 1, Ch. 6), Varro (first century BC) lists these ten: the Persian, the Libyan, the Delphic, the Cimmerian, the Erythræan, the Samian, the Cumæan, the Hellespontine (in Trojan territory), the Phrygian (at Ancyra), and the Tiburtine (named Albunea).

== Specific sibyls ==
=== Cimmerian Sibyl ===
Naevius names the Cimmerian Sibyl in his books of the Punic War and Piso in his annals.

Evander, the son of Sibyl, founded in Rome the shrine of Pan that is called the Lupercal.

=== Cumaean Sibyl ===
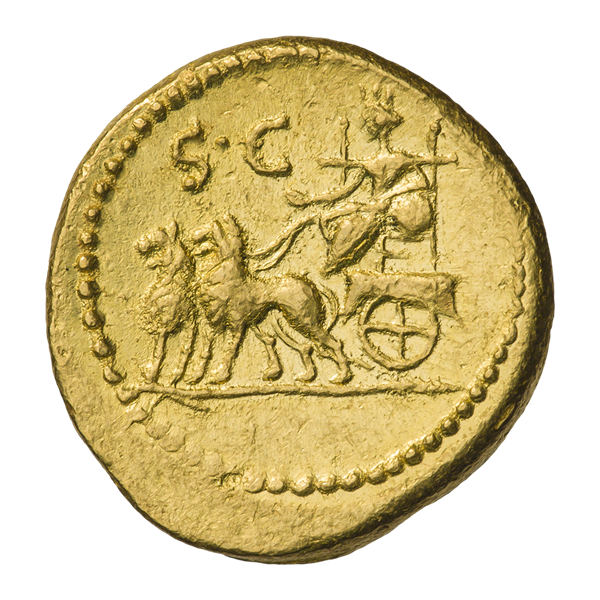
Cumaean Sibyl on a coin of 43 BC, shown riding in a biga drawn by lions with a patera in her hand

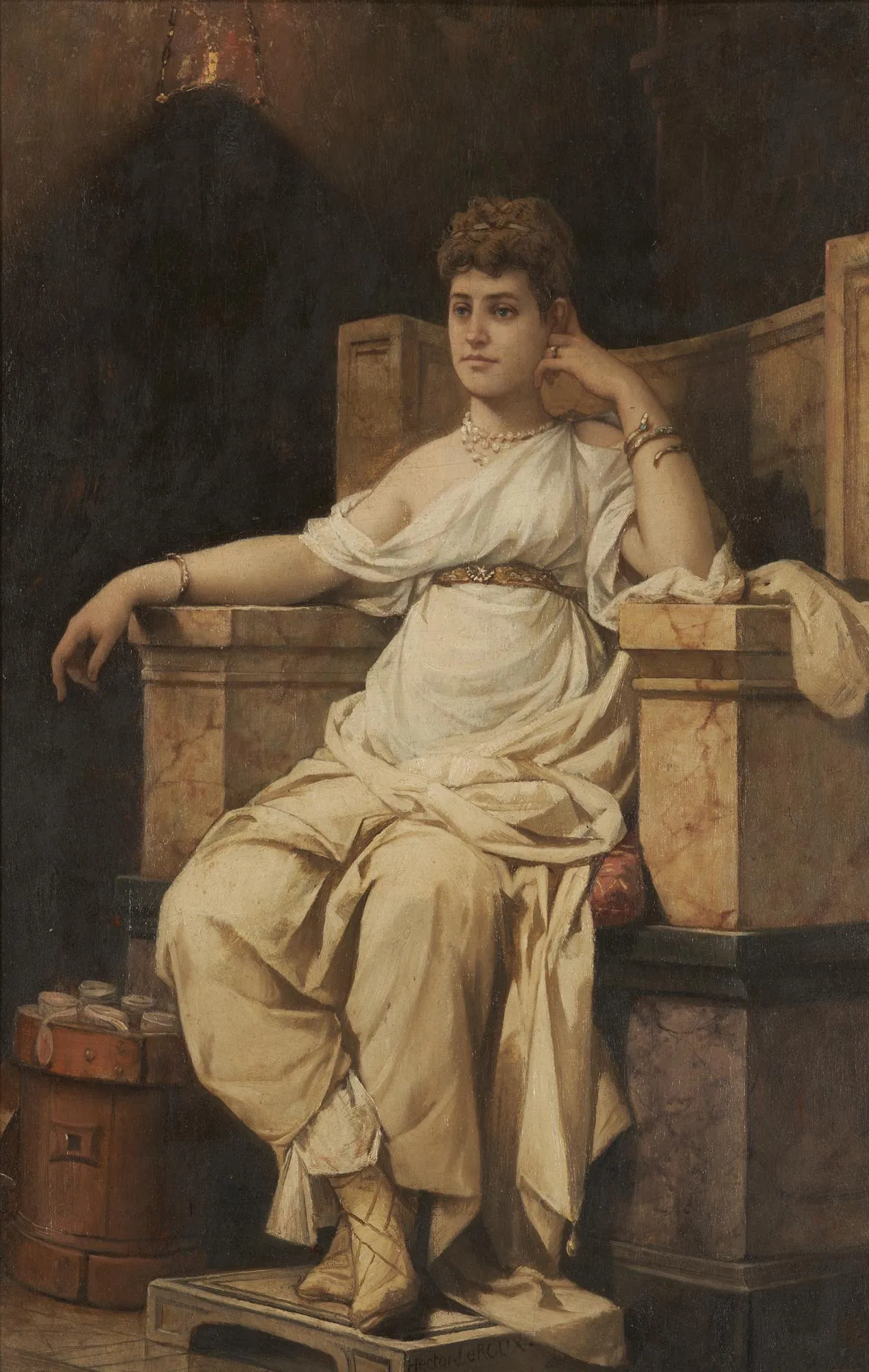
The Sibyl of Cumae, by Hector Leroux

The sibyl who most concerned the Romans was the Cumaean Sibyl, located near the Greek city of Naples, whom Virgil's Aeneas consults before his descent to the lower world (Aeneid book VI: 10). Burkert notes (1985, p. 117) that the conquest of Cumae by the Oscans in the fifth century destroyed the tradition, but provides a terminus ante quem for a Cumaean sibyl. She is said to have sold the original Sibylline books to Tarquinius Superbus, the last king of Rome. In Virgil's Fourth Eclogue, the Cumaean sibyl foretells the coming of a savior—possibly a flattering reference to the poet's patron, Augustus. Christians later identified this saviour as Jesus.

=== Delphic Sibyl ===
The Delphic Sibyl was a woman who prophesied before the Trojan Wars (c. eleventh century BC). She was noted by Pausanias in his writing during the second century AD about local traditions in Greece. This earliest documented Delphic Sibyl would have predated by hundreds of years the priestess of Apollo active at the oracle from around the eighth century BC who was known as Pythia. As Greek religion passed through transitions to the pantheon of the Classical Greeks that is most familiar to modern readers, Apollo had become the deity represented by Pythia and those who then officiated at the already ancient oracle.

=== Erythraean Sibyl ===
The Erythraean Sibyl was sited at Erythrae, a town in Ionia opposite Chios.

Apollodorus of Erythrae affirms the Erythraean Sibyl to have been his own countrywoman and to have predicted the Trojan War and prophesied to the Greeks who were moving against Ilium both that Troy would be destroyed and that Homer would write falsehoods.

The word acrostic was first applied to the prophecies of the Erythraean Sibyl, which were written on leaves and arranged so that the initial letters of the leaves always formed a word.

=== Hellespontine Sibyl ===
The Hellespontine, or Trojan Sibyl, presided over the Apollonian oracle at Dardania.

The Hellespontian Sibyl was born in the village of Marpessus near the small town of Gergitha, during the lifetimes of Solon and Cyrus the Great. Marpessus, according to Heraclides of Pontus, was formerly within the boundaries of the Troad. The sibylline collection at Gergis was attributed to the Hellespontine Sibyl and was preserved in the temple of Apollo at Gergis. Thence it passed to Erythrae, where it became famous.

=== Libyan Sibyl ===
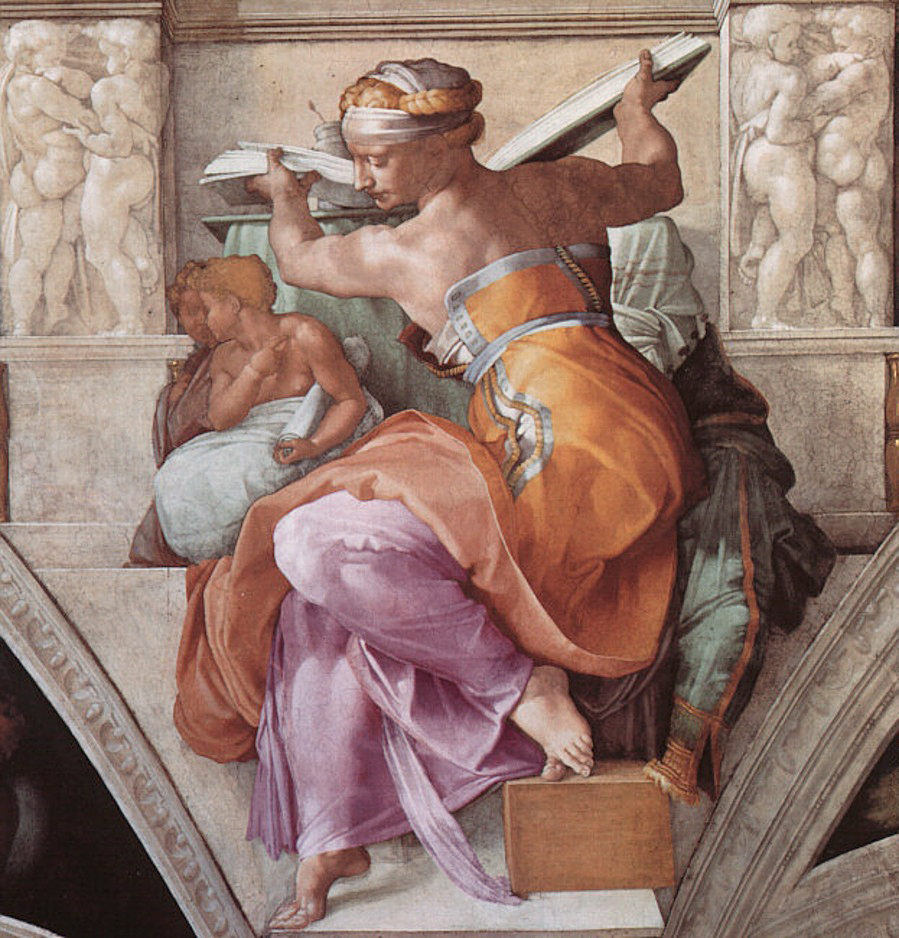
Michelangelo's Libyan Sibyl, Sistine Chapel ceiling

The Libyan Sibyl was identified with prophetic priestesses presiding over the ancient Zeus-Amon (Zeus represented with the horns of Amon) oracle at the Siwa Oasis in the Western Desert of Egypt. The oracle here was consulted by Alexander after his conquest of Egypt. The mother of the Libyan Sibyl was Lamia, the daughter of Poseidon. Euripides mentions the Libyan Sibyl in the prologue to his tragedy Lamia.

=== Persian Sibyl ===
The Persian Sibyl was said to be a prophetic priestess presiding over the Apollonian Oracle; although her location remained vague enough so that she might be called the "Babylonian Sibyl", the Persian Sibyl is said to have foretold the exploits of Alexander the Great. Also named Sambethe, she was reported to be of the family of Noah. The second-century AD traveller Pausanias, pausing at Delphi to enumerate four sibyls, mentions the "Hebrew Sibyl" who was

brought up in Palestine named Sabbe, whose father was Berosus and her mother Erymanthe. Some say she was a Babylonian, while others call her an Egyptian Sibyl.

The medieval Byzantine encyclopedia, the Suda, credits the Hebrew Sibyl as author of the Sibylline oracles.

=== Phrygian Sibyl ===
The Phrygian Sibyl is most well known for being conflated with Cassandra, Priam's daughter in Homer's Iliad. The Phrygian Sibyl appears to be a doublet of the Hellespontine Sibyl.

=== Samian Sibyl ===
The Samian sibyl's oracular site was at Samos.

=== Tiburtine Sibyl ===
To the classical sibyls of the Greeks, the Romans added a tenth, the Tiburtine Sibyl, whose seat was the ancient Sabino–Latin town of Tibur (modern Tivoli). The mythic meeting of Augustus with the Sibyl, of whom he inquired whether he should be worshiped as a god, was a favored motif of Christian artists. Whether the sibyl in question was the Etruscan Sibyl of Tibur or the Greek Sibyl of Cumae is not always clear. The Christian author Lactantius had no hesitation in identifying the sibyl in question as the Tiburtine Sibyl, nevertheless. He gave a circumstantial account of the pagan sibyls that is useful mostly as a guide to their identifications, as seen by fourth-century Christians:

The Tiburtine Sibyl, by name Albunea, is worshiped at Tibur as a goddess, near the banks of the Anio, in which stream her image is said to have been found, holding a book in her hand. Her oracular responses the Senate transferred into the capitol. (Divine Institutes I.vi)

An apocalyptic pseudo-prophecy exists, attributed to the Tiburtine Sibyl, written c. AD 380, but with revisions and interpolations added at later dates. It purports to prophesy the advent of a final emperor named Constans, vanquishing the foes of Christianity, bringing about a period of great wealth and peace, ending paganism, and converting the Jews. After vanquishing Gog and Magog, the emperor is said to resign his crown to God. This would give way to the Antichrist. Ippolito d'Este rebuilt the Villa d'Este at Tibur, the modern Tivoli, from 1550 onward, and commissioned elaborate fresco murals in the Villa that celebrate the Tiburtine Sibyl, as prophesying the birth of Christ to the classical world.

== In later art and literature ==
=== Middle Ages ===
In Medieval Latin, sibylla simply became the term for "prophetess": hence, some folkloric figures emerge, such as the Apennine Sibyl.

Hildegard of Bingen, also known as the Sibyl of the Rhine, was a German Benedictine abbess and polymath. She was active as a writer, composer, philosopher, mystic, visionary, and as a medical writer and practitioner during the 12th. century. Hildegard regularly experienced visions and said that she saw all things in the light of God through the five senses.

It became used commonly in Late Gothic and Renaissance art to depict female Sibyllae alongside male prophets. The number of sibyls so depicted could vary: sometimes they were ten, as in the Classical tradition, but later two more sibyls were added, bringing the total to twelve.

=== Renaissance ===
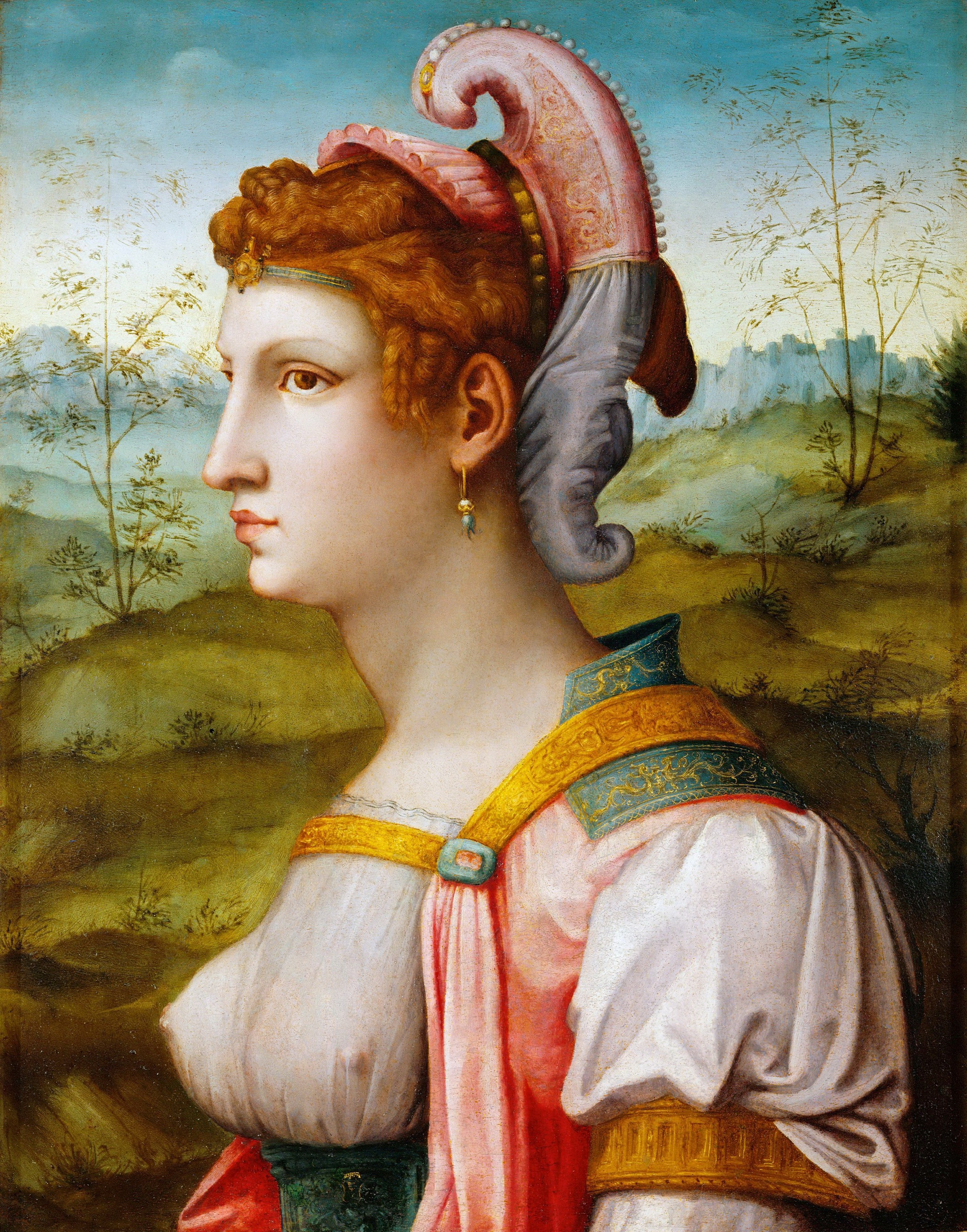
Sibyl by Francesco Ubertini, c. 1525

Sibyls featured heavily in Renaissance art. The best known depiction is that of Michelangelo who shows five sibyls in the frescoes of the Sistine Chapel ceiling; the Delphic Sibyl, Libyan Sibyl, Persian Sibyl, Cumaean Sibyl, and the Erythraean Sibyl.

The library of Pope Julius II in the Vatican has images of sibyls and they are in the pavement of the Siena Cathedral. The Basilica of Santa Maria in Aracoeli crowning the Campidoglio, Rome, is particularly associated with the Sibyl, because a medieval tradition referred the origin of its name to an otherwise unattested altar, Ara Primogeniti Dei, said to have been raised to the "firstborn of God" by the emperor Augustus, who had been warned of his advent by the sibylline books: in the church the figures of Augustus and of the Tiburtine Sibyl are painted on either side of the arch above the high altar. In the nineteenth century, Rodolfo Lanciani recalled that at Christmastime the presepio included a carved and painted figure of the sibyl pointing out to Augustus the Virgin and Child, who appeared in the sky in a halo of light. "The two figures, carved in wood, have now [1896] disappeared; they were given away or sold thirty years ago, when a new set of images was offered to the Presepio by prince Alexander Torlonia." (Lanciani, 1896 ch 1) Like prophets, Renaissance sibyls forecasting the advent of Christ appear in monuments: modelled by Giacomo della Porta in the Santa Casa at Loreto, painted by Raphael in Santa Maria della Pace, by Pinturicchio in the Borgia Apartments of the Vatican, engraved by Baccio Baldini, a contemporary of Botticelli, and graffites by Matteo di Giovanni in the pavement of the Duomo of Siena.

François Rabelais mentions: "How know we but that she may be an eleventh sibyl or a second Cassandra?" in his Gargantua and Pantagruel, iii. 16, noted in Brewer's Dictionary of Phrase and Fable, 1897.

Shakespeare references the sibyls in his plays, including Othello, Titus Andronicus, The Merchant of Venice, and especially Troilus and Cressida. In the latter, Shakespeare employed the common Renaissance comparison of Cassandra to a sibyl.

A collection of twelve motets by Orlande de Lassus entitled Prophetiae Sibyllarum (pub. 1600) draw inspiration from the sibyl figures of antiquity. The work—for four voices a cappella—consists of a prologue and twelve prophecies, each once corresponding to an individual Sibyl. While the text speaks of the coming of Jesus Christ, the composer reflects the mystical aura of the prophecies by using chromaticism in an extreme manner, a compositional technique that became very fashionable at the time. It is possible that Lassus not only viewed Michelangelo's depictions, but also drew the chromatic manière from a number of Italian composers, who experimented at the time.

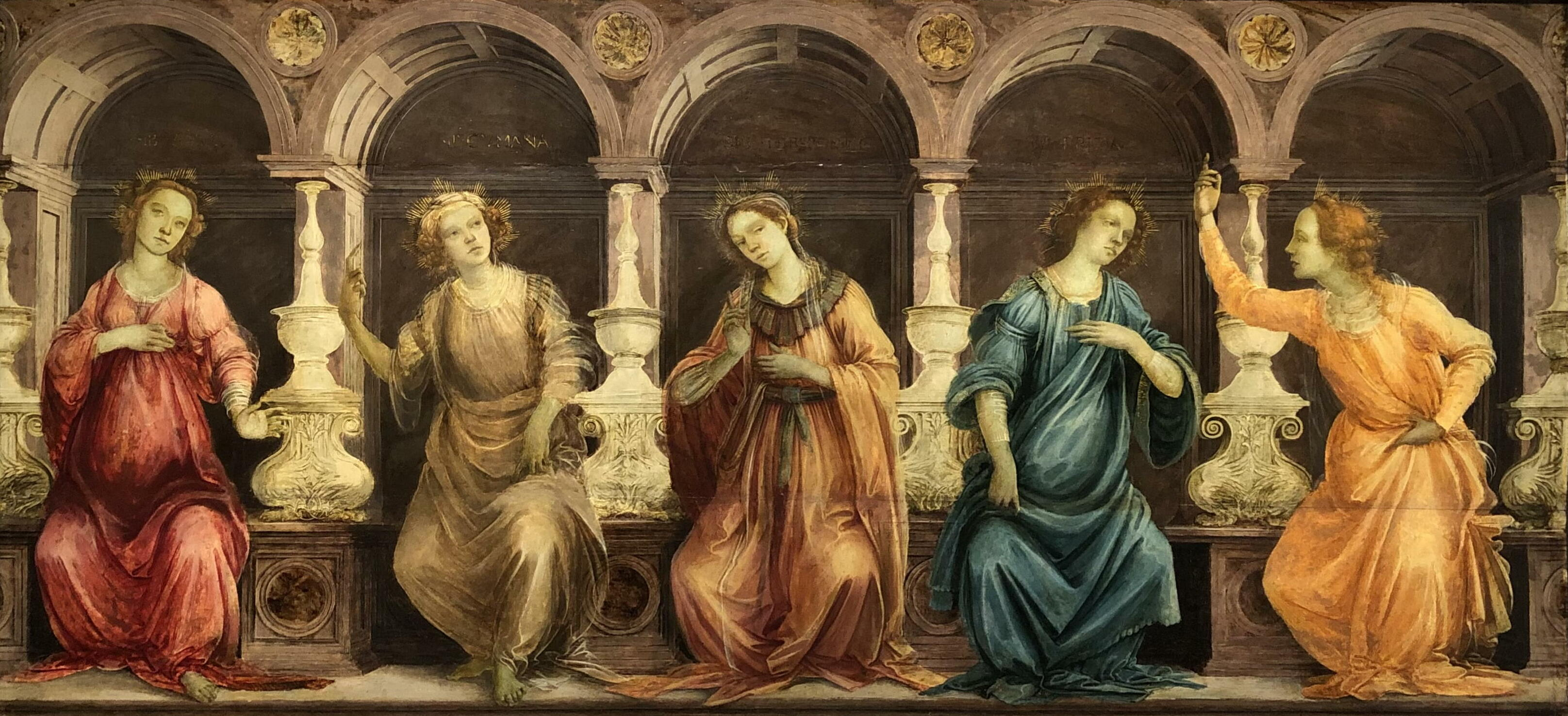
Filippino Lippi, Five Sibyls Seated in Niches: the Samian, Cumean, Hellespontic, Phrygian and Tiburtine, c. 1465–1470, Christ Church, Oxford.
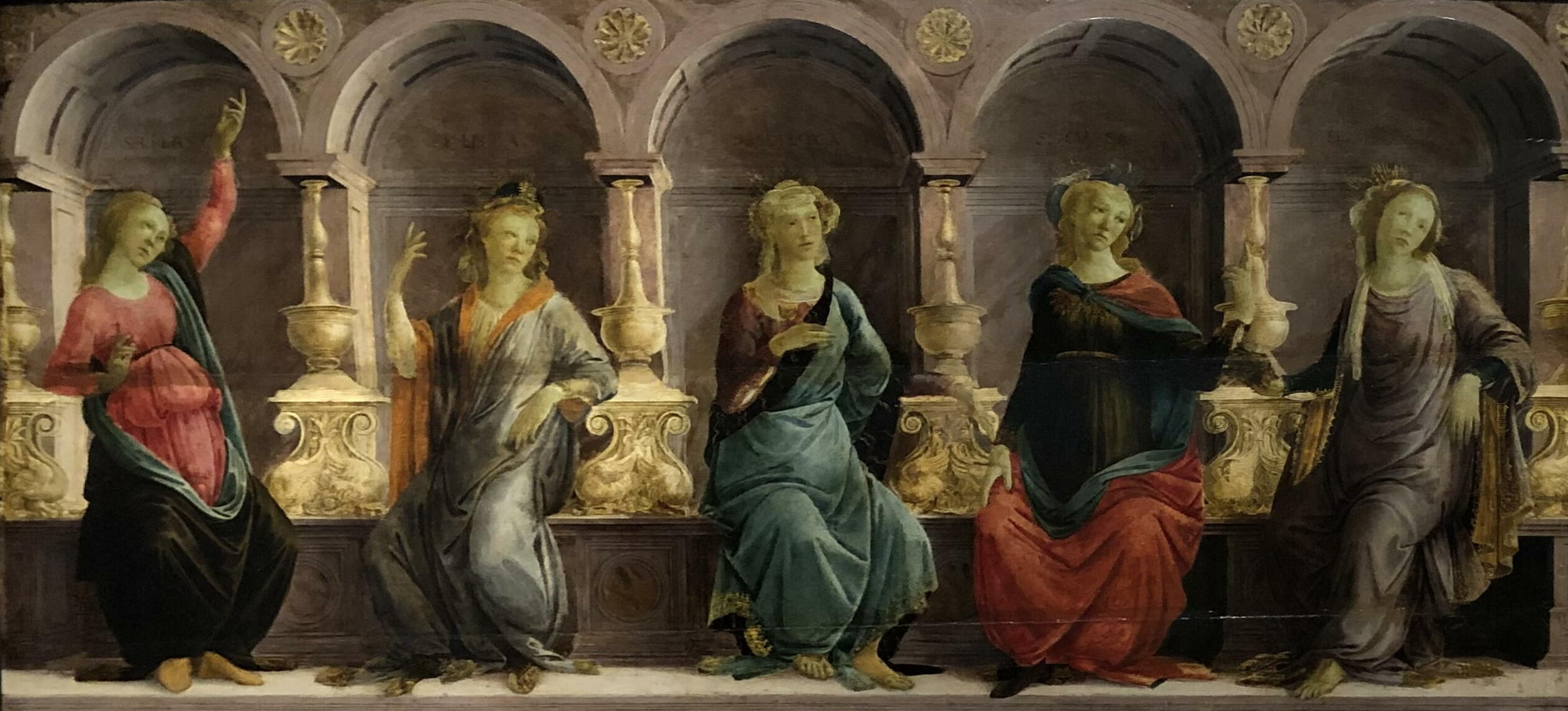
Filippino Lippi, Five Sibyls Seated in Niches: The Persian, Libyan, Delphic, Cimmerian and Erythraean, c. 1465–1470, Christ Church, Oxford.

== Sibylline books ==
The sayings of sibyls and oracles were notoriously open to interpretation (compare Nostradamus) and were constantly used for both civil and cult propaganda. These sayings and sibyls should not be confused with the extant sixth-century collection of Sibylline Oracles, which typically predict disasters rather than prescribe solutions.

Some genuine Sibylline verses are preserved in the second-century Book of Marvels of Phlegon of Tralles. The oldest collection of written Sibylline Books appears to have been made about the time of Solon and Cyrus at Gergis on Mount Ida in the Troad. The sibyl, who was born near there, at Marpessus, and whose tomb was later marked by the temple of Apollo built upon the archaic site, appears on the coins of Gergis, c. 400–350 BCE. (cf. Phlegon, quoted in the fifth-century geographical dictionary of Stephanus of Byzantium, under 'Gergis'). Other places claimed to have been her home. The sibylline collection at Gergis was attributed to the Hellespontine Sibyl and was preserved in the temple of Apollo at Gergis. Thence it passed to Erythrae, where it became famous. It was this very collection, it would appear, which found its way to Cumae and from Cumae to Rome. Gergis, a city of Dardania in the Troad, a settlement of the ancient Teucri, and, consequently, a town of very great antiquity. Gergis, according to Xenophon, was a place of much strength. It had a temple sacred to Apollo Gergithius, and was said to have given birth to the sibyl, who is sometimes called Erythraea, ‘from Erythrae,’ a small place on Mount Ida, and at others Gergithia ‘of Gergis’.

== See also ==
- Pythia, the Oracle of Delphi
- Temple of the Sibyl: 18th-century fanciful naming
- The Golden Bough (mythology)

== Sources ==
- Beyer, Jürgen, 'Sibyllen', "Enzyklopädie des Märchens. Handwörterbuch zur historischen und vergleichenden Erzählforschung", vol. 12 (Berlin & New York, Walter de Gruyter 2007), coll. 625–30
- Bouché-Leclercq, Auguste, Histoire de la divination dans l'Antiquité, I–IV volumes, Paris, 1879–1882.
- Broad, William J., The Oracle: the Lost Secrets and Hidden Message of Ancient Delphi (Penguin Press, 2006).
- Burkert, Walter, Greek Religion (Harvard University Press, 1985) esp. pp. 116–18.
- Delcourt, M. L'oracle de Delphes, 1955.
- Encyclopædia Britannica, 1911.
- Fischer, Jens, Folia ventis turbata – Sibyllinische Orakel und der Gott Apollon zwischen später Republik und augusteischem Principat (Studien zur Alten Geschichte 33), Göttingen 2022.
- Fox, Robin Lane, Alexander the Great 1973. Chapter 14 gives the best modern account of Alexander's visit to the oasis at Siwah, with some background material on the Greek conception of Sibyls.
- Goodrich, Norma Lorre, Priestesses, 1990.
- Hale, John R. and others (2003). Questioning the Delphic Oracle. Retrieved Jan. 7, 2005.
- Hindrew, Vivian, The Sibyls: The First Prophetess of Mami (Wata) MWHS, 2007
- Jeanmaire, H. La Sibylle et la retour de l'âge d'or, 1939.
- Lanciani, Rofolfo, Pagan and Christian Rome, 1896, ch. 1 on-line
- Lactantius, Divine Institutions Book I, ch. vi (e-text, in English)
- Maass, E., De Sibyllarum Indicibus, Berlin, 1879.
- Parke, Herbert William, History of the Delphic Oracle, 1939.
- Parke, Herbert William, Sibyls and Sibylline Prophecy, 1988.
- Pausanias, Description of Greece, ed. and translated by Sir James Frazer, 1913 edition. Cf. v. 5
- Peck, Harry Thurston, Harper's Dictionary of Classical Antiquity, 1898.
- Pitt-Kethley, Fiona, Journeys to the Underworld, 1988
- Potter, David Stone, , Prophecy and history in the crisis of the Roman Empire: a historical commentary on the Thirteenth Sibylline Oracle, 1990. Cf. Chapter 3. review of book
- Potter, David Stone (March 11, 1999). "Prophets and Emperors. Human and Divine Authority from Augustus to Theodosius – Bryn Mawr Classical Review". Bryn Mawr Classical Review.
- Reyniers, Jeroen, The Iconography of Emperor Augustus with the Tiburtine Sibyl in the Low Countries. An Overview, in: Marco Cavalieri, Pierre Assenmaker, Mattia Cavagna, David Engels (ed.), Augustus Through the Ages: Receptions, Readings and Appropriations of the Historical Figure of the First Roman Emperor, Collection Latomus, Brussels, 2022, p. 209-236.
- Smith, William, Dictionary of Greek and Roman Biography and Mythology, 1870, article on Sibylla,
- West, Martin Litchfield, The Orphic Poems, Oxford, 1983.
