= Gergis (Troad) =

Town in ancient Troad

Coordinates: 39°53′55″N 26°36′33″E

Gergis (Ancient Greek: Γέργις), also known as Gergithus (Γέργιθος) or Gergitha (Γέργιθα) or Gergithes (Γέργιθες), and later Kerge, was a town in ancient Troad, on the north of the Scamander River.

== Location ==
Its site is located near Karıncalı, a village in the Bayramiç District of Çanakkale Province in Asiatic Turkey.

== History ==
It was inhabited, according to Herodotus, by descendants of the mythical Teucrians. Herodotus also records that it was passed by the Persian army of Xerxes I on the way to Abydos in 480 BCE. In the time of Xenophon Gergis is called a strong place; it had an acropolis and strong walls, and was one of the chief towns of the Dardanian princess Mania. King Attalus of Pergamus transplanted the inhabitants of Gergis to a place near the sources of the Caicus, whence we afterwards find a place called Gergetha or Gergithion, near Larissa Phrikonis, in the territory of Cyme. The old town of Gergis was believed by some to have been the birthplace of the Sibyl, whence coins found there have the image of the prophetess impressed upon them.

== People ==
A Cephalon of Gergis, author of a Troica, is mentioned as a very ancient historian by Dionysius of Halicarnassus; Athenaeus calls him Cephalion and remarks that the Troica under his name was the work of Hegesianax of Alexandria.

Cephalion (Κεφαλίων) or Cephalon (Κεφάλων) of Gergis was a rhetor and historian during the reign of Hadrian. He left his city because of enmity with its rulers and went to Sicily. He wrote many works in Ionic Greek.
