= Hellespontine Sibyl =

Priestess presiding over the Apollonian oracle at Dardania

Montfoort's rendering of the Hellespontine Sibyl

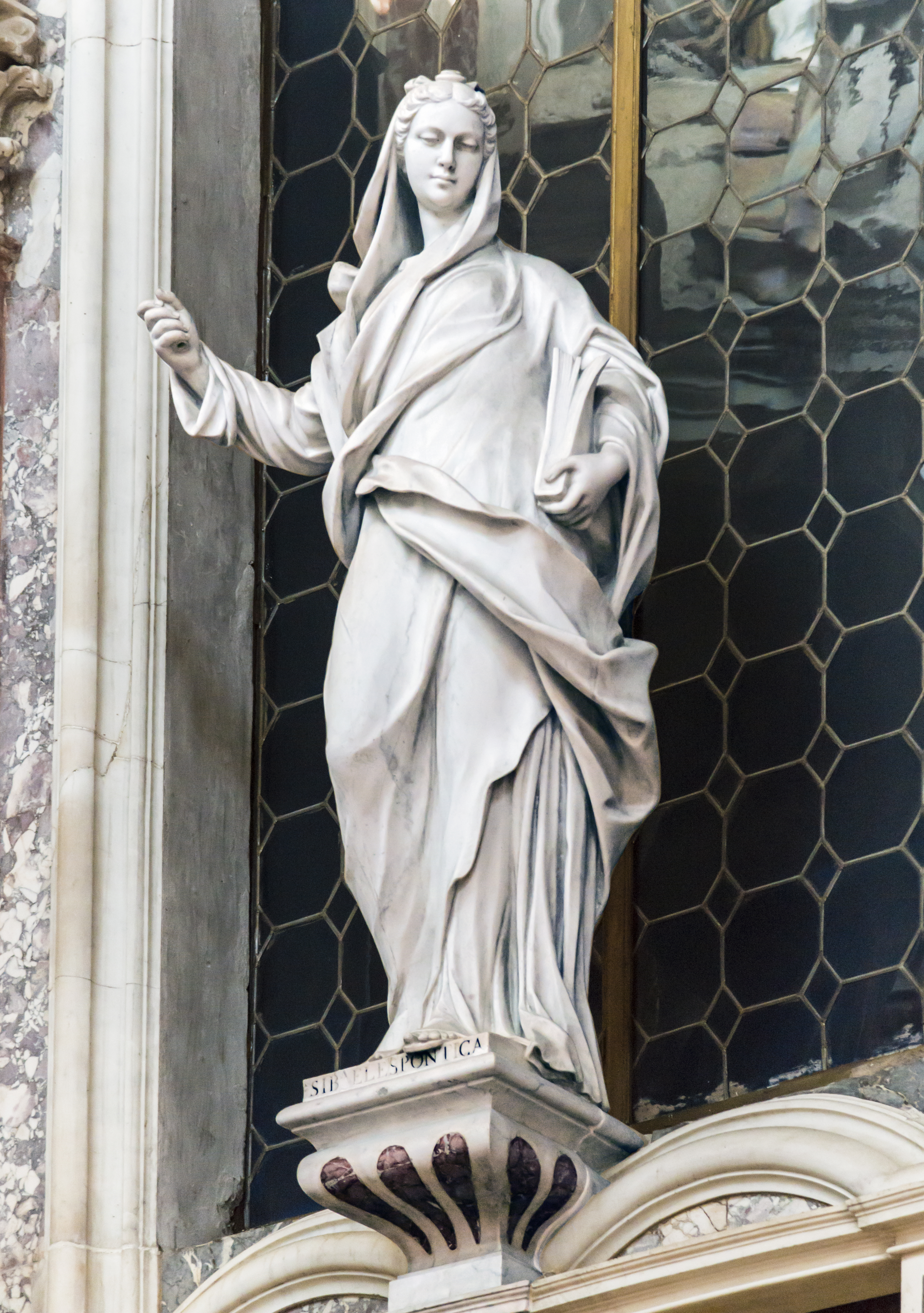
Statue in Scalzi, Venice

The Hellespontine Sibyl was the priestess presiding over the Apollonian oracle at Dardania. The Sibyl is sometimes referred to as the Trojan Sibyl. The word Sibyl comes (via Latin) from the Ancient Greek word sibylla, meaning prophetess or oracle. The Hellespontine Sibyl was known, particularly in the late Roman Imperial period and the early Middle Ages, for a claim that she predicted the crucifixion of Jesus Christ. This claim comes from the Sibylline Oracles, which are not to be confused with the Sibylline Books.

The Hellespontian Sibyl was born in the village of Marpessos near the small town of Gergis, during the lifetimes of Solon and Cyrus the Great. According to Heraclides of Pontus, Marpessus was formerly within the boundaries of the Troad.

The sibylline collection at Gergis was attributed to the Hellespontine Sibyl and preserved in the temple of Apollo at Gergis. Later, it was passed on to Erythrae, where it then became famous.
