= Samian Sibyl =

Ancient Greek priestess

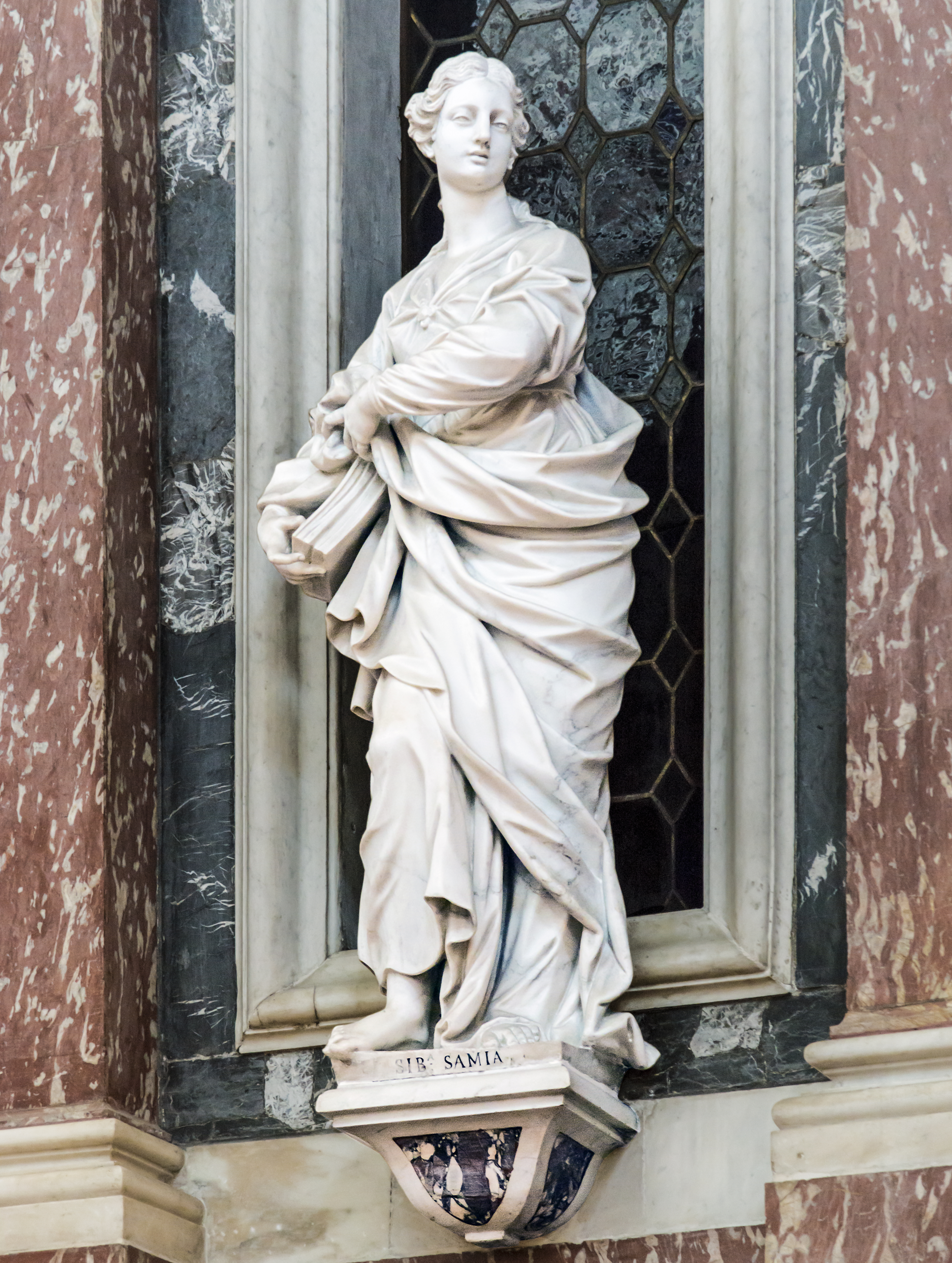
Samian Sibyl - Scalzi, Venice

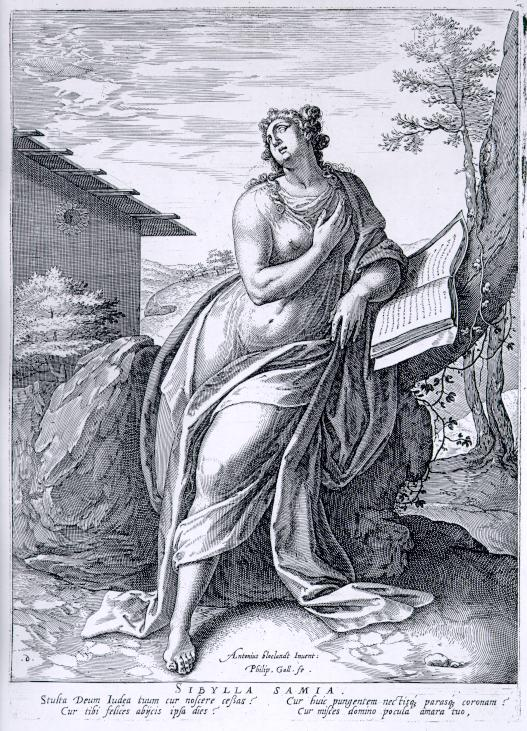
Montfoort's rendering of the Samian Sibyl.

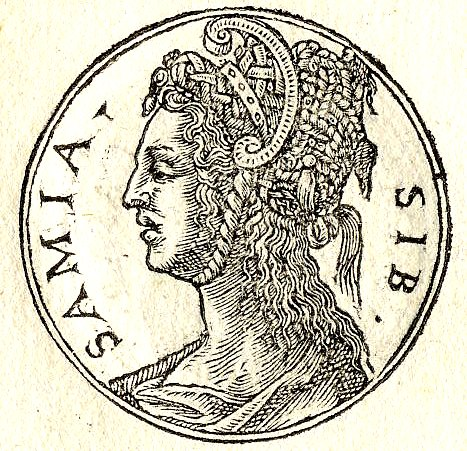
Sibylla-Samia was the priestess presiding over the Apollonian oracle near Hera's temple on the Isle of Samos, a Greek island. Published by Guillaume Rouillein in 1553.

The Samian Sibyl was the priestess presiding over the Apollonian oracle near Hera's temple on the Isle of Samos, a Greek colony. The word Sibyl comes (via Latin) from the ancient Greek word sibylla, meaning prophetess. There were many Sibyls in the ancient world but she is the one who prophesied the Birth of Jesus in the stable. The Samian Sibyl, by name Phemonoe, or Phyto of whom Eratosthenes wrote.

The Suda's lexicon says that the Erythraean Sibyl was also called Samian. Pausanias confirms that the Erythraean Sibyl lived the greater part of her life in Samos (Phocis, 12, 5). The Samian Sibyl was known as Phyto, or better Foito, from the Greek word foitos, which indicates the wandering, especially the mind's. Modern researchers of Samos island consider that her house was in the cave of Panagia Spiliani monastery, which probably is also the cavern of Pythagoras, according to the testimony of the Neoplatonic philosopher Porphyry.

Interesting is the reference of Symeon Metaphrastes (the greatest of the Byzantine historians), which says that the Samian Sibyl existed when the city of Byzantium was built, the famous ancient colony of the Megarians, which was converted by Constantine the Great into the capital of the empire, after having rebuilt, and was called Constantinople. "During this time Sibyl is known in Samos, and the Byzantium was built under the Megarians". (Simeon Logothetis, Leon Grammatikos chronographia, page 37)
