= Apollodorus of Erythrae =

Apollodorus of Erythrae was a writer of ancient Greece, who spoke of the Erythraean Sibyl as his fellow-citizen.
