= Erythraean Sibyl =

Prophetess of classical antiquity

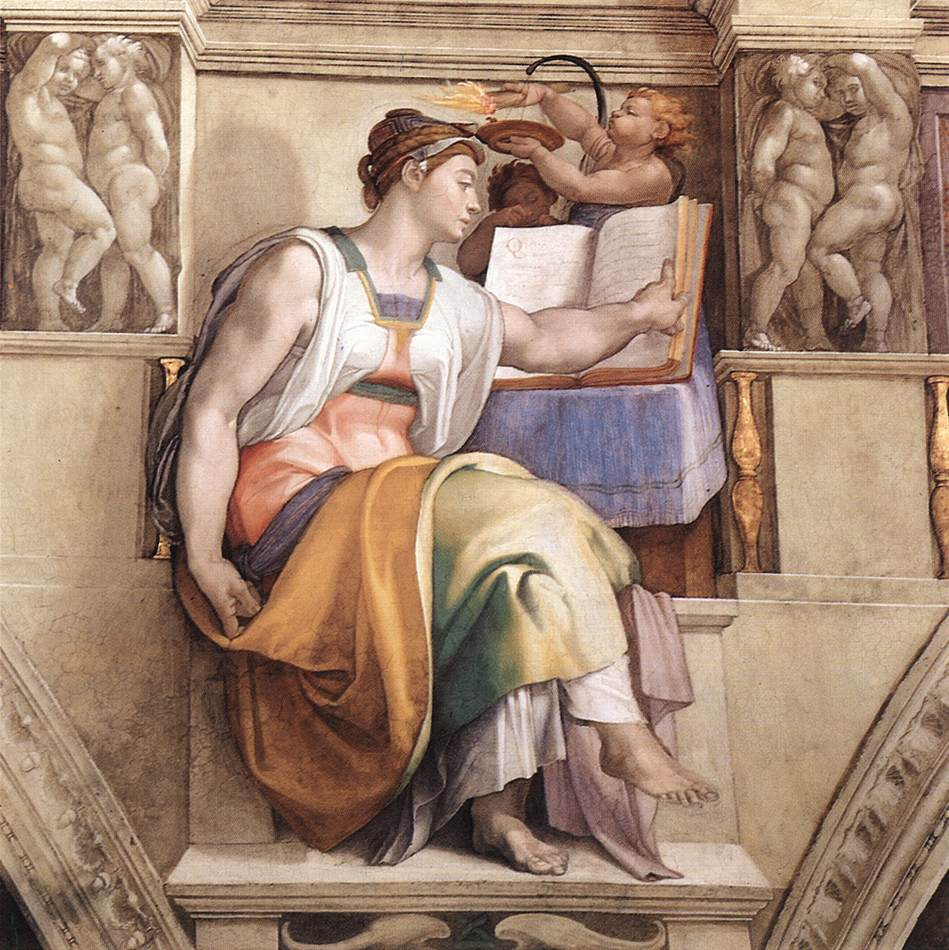
Michelangelo's rendering of the Erythraean Sibyl (detail of the Sistine Chapel ceiling)

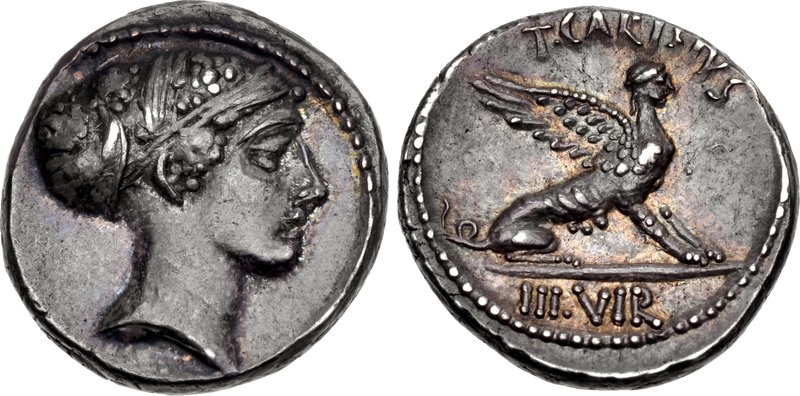
Coin of 46 BC with image of the Erythraean Sibyl Herophile with hair elaborately decorated with jewels and enclosed in a sling, tied with bands.

The Erythraean Sibyl was the prophetess of classical antiquity presiding over the Apollonian oracle at Erythrae, a town in Ionia opposite Chios, which was built by Neleus, the son of Codrus.

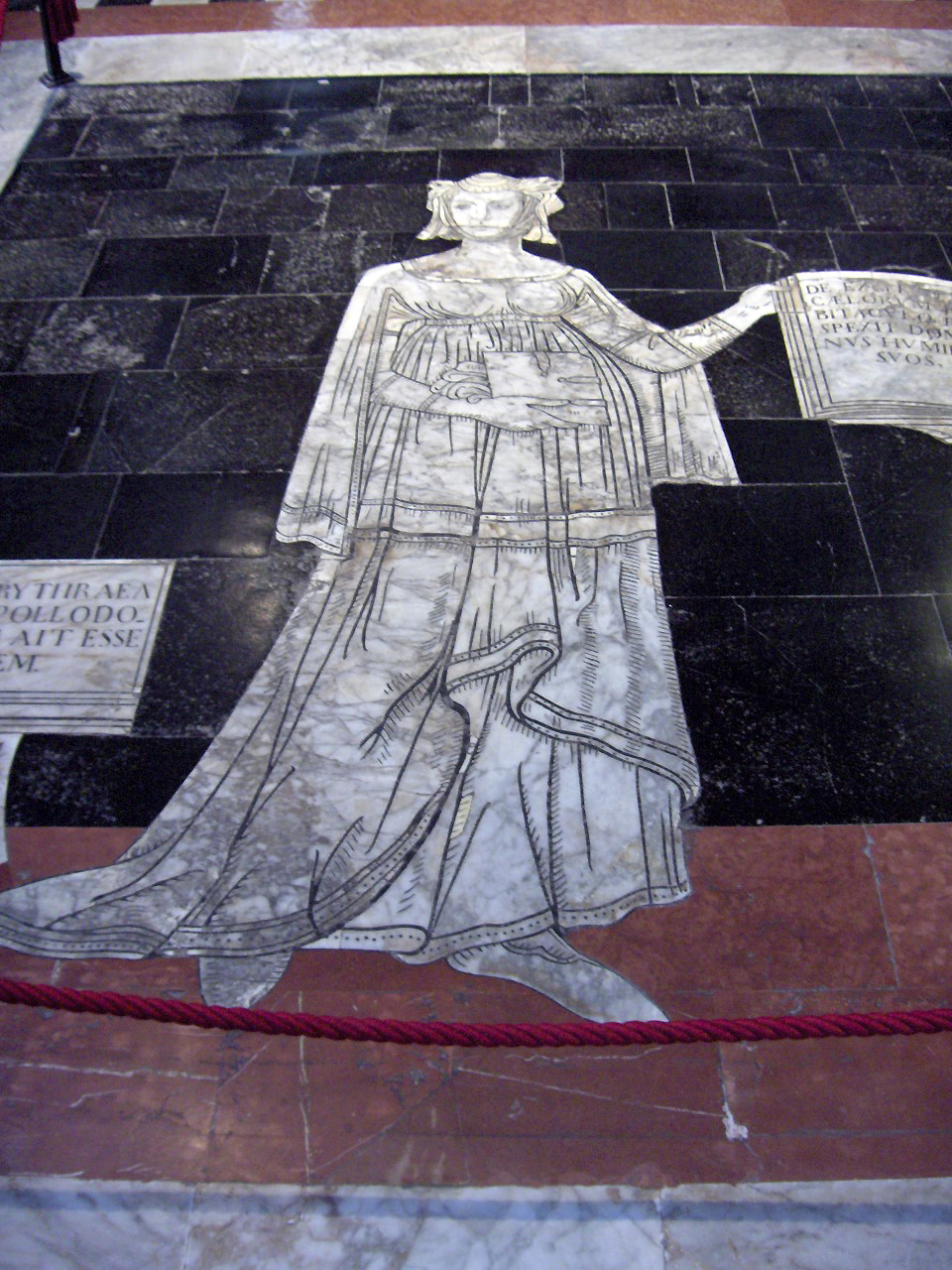
Erythraean Sibyl as a floor mosaic in the Cathedral of Siena, Italy

The word Sibyl comes (via Latin) from the ancient Greek word sibylla, meaning prophetess. Sibyls would give answers whose value depended upon good questions — unlike prophets, who typically answered with responses indirectly related to questions asked.

Presumably there was more than one sibyl at Erythrae. One is recorded as having been named Herophile. At least one is said to have been from Chaldea, a nation in the southern portion of Babylonia, being the daughter of Berossus (who wrote the Chaldean history) and Erymanthe. Apollodorus of Erythrae, however, says that one who was his own countrywoman predicted the Trojan War and prophesied to the Greeks both that Troy would be destroyed and that Homer would write falsehoods.

The term acrostic has been applied to the prophecies of the Erythraean Sibyl, which were written on leaves and arranged so that the initial letters of the leaves always formed a word.

The Erythraean Sibyl is believed to have made extremely precise statements regarding the coming of Christ. In Christian iconography, the Erythraean Sibyl is credited with prophesying the coming of the Redeemer, which prophecy was in the form of an acrostic whose initial letters spelled out "ΙΗΣΟΥΣ ΧΡΕΙΣΤΟΣ ΘΕΟΥ ΥΙΟΣ ΣΩΤΗΡ ΣΤΑΥΡΟΣ" ("Jesus Christ, God's Son, Savior, Cross). Examples were in mediaeval paintings in Salisbury Cathedral, and others are shown in the illustrations on this page.

== See also ==
- Sibylline Oracles
- Greek Mythology
