= List of Roman dictators =

A list of all of the Roman dictators and magistri equitum known from ancient sources. In some cases the names or dates have been inferred by modern historians.

== Key to Latin terms and phrases ==
Roman dictators were usually appointed for a specific purpose, or causa, which limited the scope of their activities. The chief causae were rei gerundae (a general purpose, usually to lead an army in the field against a particular enemy), clavi figendi (an important religious rite involving the driving of a nail into the wall of the Temple of Jupiter Optimus Maximus), and comitiorum habendorum (the holding of the comitia to elect magistrates, when the consuls were unable to do so).

Other causae included ludorum faciendorum, holding the Ludi Romani (Roman games), an important religious festival; ferarium constituendarum (establishing a religious festival in response to serious prodigies); seditionis sedandae (quelling sedition); and in one remarkable case, senatus legendi (filling up the ranks of the Senate after the Battle of Cannae).

The causa given at the very end of the Republic for the dictatorships of Sulla and Caesar are completely novel, as the powers granted greatly exceeded those traditionally accorded a Roman dictator. By legibus faciendis et rei publicae constituendae causa, Sulla was empowered to rewrite the laws and revise the constitution of the Roman state; by dictator perpetuo rei publicae constituendae causa, Caesar was appointed dictator in perpetuity, and given the power to revise the constitution.

The various causae may not have been legally distinguished from one another prior to 368 BC, when Publius Manlius Capitolinus was appointed dictator seditionis sedandae et rei gerundae causa. The precise formula of each causa later reported by ancient historians may only date to Manlius' dictatorship, in which case the causae attributed to earlier dictators must be later additions.

=== Other phrases ===
- abdicavit – abdicated, or resigned.
- mortuus est – died in office.
- non iniit – not inaugurated.
- occisus est – killed, slain.
- sine magistro equitum – without a magister equitum.

Roman numerals given following a name indicate that the dictator or magister equitum for that year previously held the same magistracy. The causae listed in the table are based largely on T. R. S. Broughton's The Magistrates of the Roman Republic, reporting those given in ancient sources. For cases in which no causa is given, rei gerundae may usually be inferred.

== List of dictators and magistri equitum ==
=== 6th and 5th centuries BC ===
Year BC	Year AUC	Dictator	Magister equitum	Notes
501	253	Titus Larcius Flavus (Note: The name of the first dictator is also given as Manius Valerius, but Livy rejects this in favor of Titus Larcius Flavus on the basis of the law that only consulars could be named dictator; Valerius had not yet been named consul. Broughton follows Livy in this.)	Spurius Cassius Vecellinus	rei gerundae causa
496	255	Aulus Postumius Albus Regillensis	Titus Aebutius Helva	
494	260	Manius Valerius Volusus Maximus	Quintus Servilius Priscus Structus	
463	291	(Gaius Aemilius Mamercus) (Note: No dictator is listed for this year in the fasti consulares, but Lydus says that there was a dictator in the forty-eighth year of the Republic. Bendel links this with the story that the senate appointed a dictator clavi figendi causa in 363 BC because that had worked to stop a pestilence a century earlier and concludes that Mamercus was this dictator. Broughton sees this as an insufficient reason to say that Mamercus was dictator in 463 BC, and suggests that Lydus has mistaken an interrex for a dictator.)	unknown	clavi figendi causa
458	296	Lucius Quinctius Cincinnatus	Lucius Tarquitius Flaccus	
439	315	Lucius Quinctius Cincinnatus II	Gaius Servilius Ahala	
437	317	Mamercus Aemilius Mamercinus	Lucius Quinctius Cincinnatus	
435	319	Quintus Servilius Priscus Fidenas	Postumus Aebutius Helva Cornicen	
434	320	Mamercus Aemilius Mamercinus II	Aulus Postumius Tubertus	
431	323	Aulus Postumius Tubertus	Lucius Julius Iullus	
426	328	Mamercus Aemilius Mamercinus III	Aulus Cornelius Cossus	
418	336	Quintus Servilius Priscus Fidenas II	Gaius Servilius Axilla	
408	346	Publius Cornelius Rutilus Cossus	Gaius Servilius Ahala	

=== 4th century BC ===
Year BC	Year AUC	Dictator	Magister equitum	Notes
396	358	Marcus Furius Camillus	Publius Cornelius Maluginensis	
390	364	Marcus Furius Camillus II	Lucius Valerius Potitus	
389	365	Marcus Furius Camillus III	Gaius Servilius Ahala	
385	369	Aulus Cornelius Cossus	Titus Quinctius Cincinnatus Capitolinus	
380	374	Titus Quinctius Cincinnatus Capitolinus	Aulus Sempronius Atratinus	
368	386	Marcus Furius Camillus IV	Lucius Aemilius Mamercinus	rei gerundae causa
368	386	Publius Manlius Capitolinus	Gaius Licinius Calvus	seditionis sedandae et rei gerundae causa
367	387	Marcus Furius Camillus V	Titus Quinctius Cincinnatus Capitolinus	rei gerundae causa
363	391	Lucius Manlius Capitolinus Imperiosus	Lucius Pinarius Natta	clavi figendi causa
362	392	Appius Claudius Crassus Regillensis (Note: Possibly the same individual as Appius Claudius Crassus Regillensis, rather than the consul of 349.)	Publius Cornelius Scapula? Mucius Scaevola? (Note: The name of the magister equitum is preserved in the Fasti only as "SCA[.]VLA" or "SCA[.]V[.]LA", which some scholars have interpreted as "Scapula", based on the subsequent appearance of Publius Cornelius Scapula, consul in 328 BC. Broughton notes that Attilio Degrassi's reading, indicating the second gap, would make "Scapula" improbable. "Scaevola", a surname of the Mucia gens, is plausible, but no Mucius Scaevola is mentioned in the history of this period.)	
361	393	Titus Quinctius Pennus Capitolinus Crispinus	Servius Cornelius Maluginensis	rei gerundae causa
360	394	Quintus Servilius Ahala	Titus Quinctius Pennus Capitolinus Crispinus	rei gerundae causa
358	396	Gaius Sulpicius Peticus	Marcus Valerius Poplicola	
356	398	Gaius Marcius Rutilus	Gaius Plautius Proculus	
353	401	Titus Manlius Imperiosus Torquatus	Aulus Cornelius Cossus Arvina	
352	402	Gaius Julius Iulus	Lucius Aemilius Mamercinus	
351	403	Marcus Fabius Ambustus	Quintus Servilius Ahala	comitiorum habendorum causa
350	404	Lucius Furius Camillus	Publius Cornelius Scipio	comitiorum habendorum causa
349	405	Titus Manlius Imperiosus Torquatus II	Aulus Cornelius Cossus Arvina II	comitiorum habendorum causa
348	406	(Gaius Claudius Crassinus Regillensis)	(Gaius Livius Denter)	comitiorum habendorum causa; names uncertain. (Note: The names of the dictator and magister equitum for this year are missing from the consular fasti, and not explicitly stated by any ancient author. The Dictionary of Greek and Roman Biography and Mythology inserts these names, although the basis for them is not stated.)
345	409	Lucius Furius Camillus II	Gnaeus Manlius Capitolinus Imperiosus	
344	410	Publius Valerius Poplicola	Quintus Fabius Ambustus	ferarium constituendarum causa
342	412	Marcus Valerius Corvus	Lucius Aemilius Mamercinus Privernas	
340	414	Lucius Papirius Crassus	Lucius Papirius Cursor	
339	415	Quintus Publilius Philo	Decimus Junius Brutus Scaeva	
337	417	Gaius Claudius Inregillensis	Gaius Claudius Hortator	abdicavit
335	419	Lucius Aemilius Mamercinus Privernas	Quintus Publilius Philo	comitiorum habendorum causa
334	420	Publius Cornelius Rufinus	Marcus Antonius	abdicavit; 333 the first of the "dictator years". (Note: The fasti consulares, but no other source, list four years in which there was a dictator but no consuls elected: 333, 324, 309, and 301. In each case, Livy includes the names of the dictator and magister equitum under the previous year's consuls.)
332	422	Marcus Papirius Crassus	Publius Valerius Poplicola	
331	423	Gnaeus Quinctilius Varus or Gnaeus Quinctius Capitolinus	Lucius Valerius Potitus	clavi figendi causa
327	427	Marcus Claudius Marcellus	Spurius Postumius Albinus	comitiorum habendorum causa; abdicavit
325	429	Lucius Papirius Cursor	Quintus Fabius Maximus Rullianus	rei gerundae causa; 324 the second of the "dictator years".
322	432	Aulus Cornelius Cossus Arvina	Marcus Fabius Ambustus	rei gerundae (for a general purpose) or ludi faciendorum causa (Note: The sources for the causa of this dictator conflict. Most historians accept that Cornelius carried on the Ludi Romani games when the praetor fell ill, and attempt to explain how an annalist would have altered the records to make this a dictator rei gerundae causa.)
321	433	Quintus Fabius Ambustus	Publius Aelius Paetus	comitiorum habendorum causa; abdicavit
321	433	Marcus Aemilius Papus	Lucius Valerius Flaccus	comitiorum habendorum causa
320	434	Gaius Maenius	Marcus Foslius Flaccinator	causa uncertain. (Note: Maenius is one of three dictators appointed in 320, none of whom is listed as having abdicated and been replaced by another dictator. Hartfield asserts that Maenius was not appointed for quaestionibus exercendis, to conduct a court of inquiry into conspiracies against the Republic, as described by Livy. Instead, she concludes that he must have had a religious function, although she cannot determine precisely which causa he had, except to exclude clavi figendi. Cornelius can only have been nominated rei gerundae causa, due to the war with the Samnites, while Manlius must have been appointed to hold the elections for the next year's magistrates.)
320	434	Lucius Cornelius Lentulus	Lucius Papirius Cursor II	
320	434	Titus Manlius Imperiosus Torquatus III	Lucius Papirius Cursor III	
316	438	Lucius Aemilius Mamercinus Privernas II	Lucius Fulvius Curvus	rei gerundae causa
315	439	Quintus Fabius Maximus Rullianus	Quintus Aulius Cerretanus; Gaius Fabius Ambustus	rei gerundae causa
314	440	Gaius Maenius II	Marcus Foslius Flaccinator II	rei gerundae causa
313	441	Gaius Poetelius Libo Visolus or Quintus Fabius Maximus Rullianus II	Marcus Foslius Flaccinator III or Marcus Poetelius Libo	rei gerundae (et clavi figendi?) causa (Note: Livy and the fasti consulares suggest that Poetelius was dictator rei gerundae causa, but Livy preserves a source who claims that one of the consuls that year instead captured the town Poetelius was said to have captured and that his dictatorship was instead clavi figendi causa. Some modern historians do not dismiss this alternate account. Because a dictator rei gerundae causa would not have hammered in the sacred nail, Hartfield adduces that he must have been appointed dictator twice this year, if he did so. Diodorus Siculus attributes the victories credited to Gaius Poetelius Libo Visolus to "Κόιντος Φάβιος" (Quintus Fabius) instead.)
312	442	Gaius Sulpicius Longus	Gaius Junius Bubulcus Brutus	rei gerundae causa (Note: The fasti consulares list Gaius Sulpicius Longus as the dictator rei gerundae causa and Gaius Junius Bubulcus Brutus as his magister equitum, but Livy names the latter as dictator, without following his usual procedure of recording the magister equitum.)
310	444	Lucius Papirius Cursor II	Gaius Junius Bubulcus Brutus II	309 the third of the "dictator years".
306	448	Publius Cornelius Scipio Barbatus	Publius Decius Mus	comitiorum habendorum causa
302	452	Gaius Junius Bubulcus Brutus	Marcus Titinius	
302	452	Marcus Valerius Corvus II	Quintus Fabius Maximus Rullianus? or Marcus Aemilius Paullus?	301 the fourth and last of the "dictator years".

=== 3rd century BC ===
Year BC	Year AUC	Dictator	Magister equitum	Notes
287	467	Quintus Hortensius mortuus est	not recorded	
287	467	Appius Claudius Caecus?	not recorded	dictator suffectus? (Note: Three dictators are known only from various literary sources. Historians date them to a period for which the fasti consulares and Livy's history are missing but nothing about their causa can be known. One of these was probably dictator suffectus after the death of Quintus Hortensius in 287 BC. Mommsen suggested that this was Claudius.)
285	469	Marcus Aemilius Barbula?	not recorded	date uncertain. (Note: One of three dictators known from literary sources, but not found in the surviving portions of the consular fasti or Livy's history. Broughton concludes that they must have held office between 292 and 285 BC, and lists them under the latest possible date.)
280	474	Gnaeus Domitius Calvinus Maximus?	not recorded	comitiorum habendorum causa
276	478	Publius Cornelius Rufinus?	not recorded	date uncertain. (Note: The third of three dictators known from literary sources, but not found in the surviving portions of the consular fasti or Livy's history. Although Broughton concluded that they must have held office between 292 and 285 BC, the Dictionary of Greek and Roman Biography and Mythology places Rufinus in 276, during the war with Pyrrhus, noting, however, that Niebuhr placed his dictatorship in 280, after the Battle of Heraclea.)
263	491	Gnaeus Fulvius Maximus Centumalus	Quintus Marcius Philippus	clavi figendi causa
257	497	Quintus Ogulnius Gallus?	Marcus Laetorius Plancianus	Latinarum feriarum causa
249	505	Marcus Claudius Glicia		abdicavit (Note: Nominated by the consul Publius Claudius Pulcher after the Senate had relieved him of his command following the Battle of Drepana. Glicia was a freedman and a scribe; as such he was considered wholly unsuitable for the office and compelled to resign even before he could name his magister equitum. The precise means by which his resignation was procured is unclear. Aulus Atilius Calatinus was appointed in Claudius' stead. Notwithstanding his humble origin, Glicia was recorded as dictator in the consular fasti, and continued to wear the toga praetexta as a symbol of the honour. In 236 BC, he was a legate under the consul Gaius Licinius Varus, but after granting a treaty without permission from the Senate or the consul, was handed over to the enemy, who returned him unharmed; he was then imprisoned, banished, or put to death.)
249	505	Aulus Atilius Calatinus	Lucius Caecilius Metellus	
246	508	Tiberius Coruncanius	Marcus Fulvius Flaccus	comitiorum habendorum causa
231	523	Gaius Duilius	Gaius Aurelius Cotta	comitiorum habendorum causa
224	530	Lucius Caecilius Metellus	Numerius Fabius Buteo	comitiorum habendorum causa
221	533	Quintus Fabius Maximus Verrucosus	Gaius Flaminius	date uncertain. (Note: Livy says that Fabius was appointed dictator for the second time in 217. Broughton adduces that he must have been dictator during a gap in the Capitoline fasti from 221 to 219, and before Livy's history resumes in 218. Since Flaminius was censor in 220 and 219, Broughton places this dictatorship in 221.)
217	537	Quintus Fabius Maximus Verrucosus II	Marcus Minucius Rufus	Minucius given authority equal to the dictator's. (Note: Minucius, the magister equitum, vehemently opposed the dictator's delaying strategy against Hannibal, and induced a tribune of the plebs to propose a law granting him authority equal to that of the dictator. Some scholars therefore regard Minucius as a second dictator, while others describe him as a magister equitum with dictatorial imperium. Since ancient sources refer to Minucius as having been dictator, those who consider him merely magister equitum during Fabius' dictatorship suggest that Minucius later held the office during a period for which Livy's history is missing, perhaps in order to hold the comitia.)
217	537	Lucius Veturius Philo	Marcus Pomponius Matho	comitiorum habendorum causa; abdicavit
216	538	Marcus Junius Pera	Tiberius Sempronius Gracchus	
216	538	Marcus Fabius Buteo	sine magistro equitum	senatus legendi causa (Note: This is the only instance of this causa. The Senate appointed a dictator to enroll new senators after the Battle of Cannae, instead of holding elections for new censors to carry out the same task.)
213	541	Gaius Claudius Centho	Quintus Fulvius Flaccus	comitiorum habendorum causa
210	544	Quintus Fulvius Flaccus?	Publius Licinius Crassus Dives	comitiorum habendorum causa
208	546	Titus Manlius Torquatus	Gaius Servilius Geminus	comitiorum habendorum et ludorum faciendorum causa
207	547	Marcus Livius Salinator	Quintus Caecilius Metellus	comitiorum habendorum causa
205	549	Quintus Caecilius Metellus	Lucius Veturius Philo	comitiorum habendorum causa
203	551	Publius Sulpicius Galba Maximus	Marcus Servilius Pulex Geminus	comitiorum habendorum causa
202	552	Gaius Servilius Geminus	Publius Aelius Paetus	comitiorum habendorum causa

=== 1st century BC ===
Year BC	Year AUC	Dictator	Magister equitum	Notes
82–79	672–675	Lucius Cornelius Sulla Felix	Lucius Valerius Flaccus	legibus faciendis et rei publicae constituendae causa
49	705	Gaius Julius Caesar	sine magistro equitum	rei gerundae causa
48	706	Gaius Julius Caesar II	Marcus Antonius	
47–44	707–710	Gaius Julius Caesar III	Marcus Aemilius Lepidus	
44	710	Gaius Julius Caesar IV occisus est	Marcus Aemilius Lepidus II; Gaius Octavius; Gnaeus Domitius Calvinus (non iniit)	dictator perpetuo rei publicae constituendae causa

== See also ==
- Constitution of the Roman Republic
- Dictator

== Bibliography ==
- Dictionary of Greek and Roman Biography and Mythology, William Smith, ed., Little, Brown and Company, Boston (1849).
- Marianne Elizabeth Hartfield, The Roman Dictatorship: its Character and Evolution (Ph.D. dissertation), University of California, Berkeley (1981).
- T. Robert S. Broughton, The Magistrates of the Roman Republic, American Philological Association (1952).
- John Pinsent, Military Tribunes and Plebeian Consuls: The Fasti from 444 V to 342 V, Steiner, Wiesbaden (1975).
