= Chronograph of 354 =

Roman chronological and calendrical text

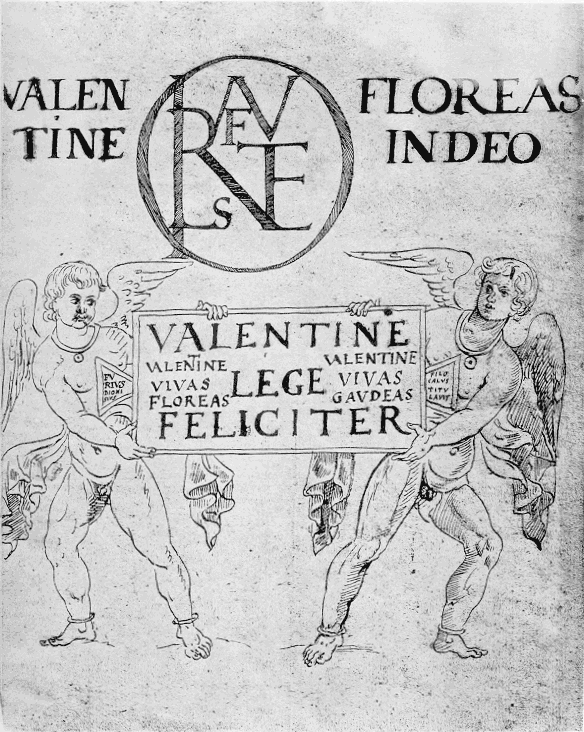
The title page and Dedication from the Barberini MS. The texts read: "Valentinus, may you flourish in God" (top), "Furius Dionysius Filocalus illustrated this work" (in triangles), "Valentinus, enjoy reading this" (main in placard), on the left "Valentinus, may you live long and flourish", on the right "Valentinus, may you live long and rejoice".

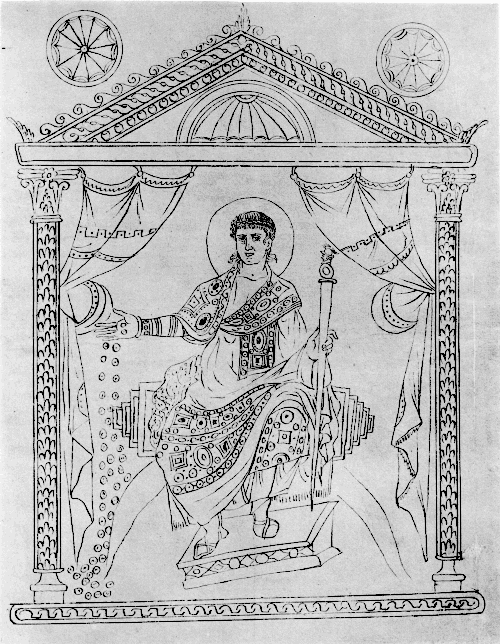
Portrait of Constantius II, dispensing largesse, from part 7 of the Barberini MS

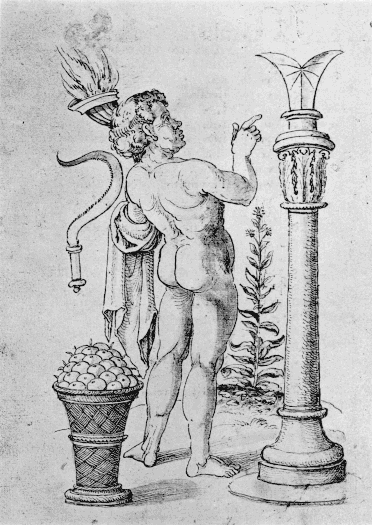
Personification of June

The Chronograph of 354 is a compilation of chronological and calendrical texts produced in 354 AD for a wealthy Roman Christian named Valentinus by the calligrapher and illustrator Furius Dionysius Filocalus. The original illustrated manuscript is lost, but several copies have survived. It is the earliest known codex to have had full page illustrations. The work is also called the Chronography or Calendar of 354, and the name Calendar of Filocalus or Filocalian Calendar is sometimes used to describe the whole collection, and sometimes just the sixth part, which is the Calendar itself. Other versions of the names ("Philocalus", "Philocalian", "Codex-Calendar of 354", etc.) are occasionally used. The text and illustrations are available online. It has had a variety of other names over the years; the historian Theodor Mommsen titled it "Chronica urbis Romae".

Amongst other historically significant information, the work contains the earliest reference to the celebration of Christmas as an annual holiday or feast, on December 25, although unique historical dates had been mentioned much earlier by Hippolytus of Rome during 202–211.

== Transmission from antiquity ==
Various partial copies or adaptations survive from the Carolingian Renaissance of the 8th–9th centuries, which were themselves copied in the Renaissance period. For example, Botticelli adapted a figure of the city of Treberis (Trier) who grasps a bound barbarian by the hair for his painting, traditionally called Pallas and the Centaur.

The most complete and faithful copies of the illustrations are the pen drawings in a 17th-century manuscript from the Barberini collection (Vatican Library, cod. Barberini lat. 2154). This was carefully copied in 1620, under the supervision of the great antiquary Nicholas-Claude Fabri de Peiresc, from the Codex Luxemburgensis, (which Peiresc had on long-term "loan"). These drawings, although twice removed from the originals, show the variety of sources that the earliest illuminators used as models for manuscript illustration, including metalwork, frescoes, and floor mosaics. The Roman originals were probably fully painted miniatures.

The copy used for the Vatican Barberini manuscript disappeared after Peiresc's death in 1637. However some folios had evidently already been lost from this Codex Luxemburgensis before Peiresc received it, since other copies include them. The suggestion of Carl Nordenfalk that the Codex Luxemburgensis copied by Peiresc was actually the Roman original has not been accepted. Peiresc himself thought the manuscript was seven or eight hundred years old when he had it, and, though Mabillon had not yet published his De re diplomatica (1681), the first systematic work of paleography, most scholars, following Meyer Schapiro, believe Peiresc would have been able to make a correct judgement on its age. For a full list of manuscripts with copies after the originals, see the external link.

== Contents ==
Furius Dionysius Filocalus was the leading scribe or calligrapher of the period, and possibly also executed the original miniatures. His name is on the dedication page. He was also a Christian, living in a moment that lay on the cusp between a pagan and a Christian Roman Empire.

The Chronography, like all Roman calendars, is as much an almanac as a calendar; it includes various texts and lists, including elegant allegorical depictions of the months. It also includes the important Liberian Catalogue, a list of popes, and the Calendar of Filocalus, from which copies of eleven miniatures survive. Among other information, it contains the earliest reference to Christmas (see Part 12 below) and the dates of Roman Games, with their number of chariot-races.

The contents are as follows (from the Barberini Ms. unless stated). All surviving miniatures are full-page, often combined with some text in various ways:

- Part 1: title page and dedication - 1 miniature
- Part 2: images of the personifications of the cities of Rome, Alexandria, Constantinople and Trier - 4 miniatures
- Part 3: images of the emperors and the birthdays of the Caesars - 2 miniatures
- Part 4: images of the seven planets with a calendar of the hours - 5 surviving miniatures. Copies of the emblematic drawings appear in a Carolingian text that portrays Mercury and Venus in heliocentric orbits.
- Part 5: the signs of the Zodiac – no miniatures surviving in this manuscript; four in other copies
- Part 6: the Philocalian calendar – seven miniatures of personifications of the Months in this MS; the full set appears in other copies
  On December 25: "N̅·INVICTI·C̅M̅·XXX" – "Birthday of the unconquered, games ordered, thirty races" – is the oldest literary reference to the pagan feast of Sol Invictus
- Part 7: consular portraits of the emperors – 2 miniatures (the last in the MS)
- Part 8: list (fasti) of the Roman consuls to AD 354
  At AD 1: "Hoc cons. dominus Iesus Christus natus est VIII kal. Ian. d. Ven. luna xv." – "When these [Gaius Caesar and Lucius Aemilius Paullus] were consuls, Lord Jesus Christ was born 8 days before the kalends of January [December 25] on the day of Venus Moon 15" – is a historical reference
- Part 9: the dates of Easter from AD 312 to 411
- Part 10: list of the prefects of the city of Rome from 254 to 354 AD
- Part 11: commemoration dates of past popes from AD 255 to 352
- Part 12: commemoration dates of the martyrs
  Line 1: "VIII kal. Ian. natus Christus in Betleem Iudeae" – "Eighth day before the kalends of January [December 25] Birth of Christ in Bethlehem of Judea" – is the oldest reference to Jesus' birth as an annual feast day
- Part 13: bishops of Rome, the Liberian Catalogue
- Part 14: The 14 regions of the City [of Rome]
- Part 15: Chronicle of the Bible
- Part 16: Chronicle of the City of Rome (a list of rulers with short comments)
According to the Codex-Calendar of 354, the Colosseum could accommodate 87,000 people.

== Chronology of Rome ==
Kings of Rome [753–509 BC]

1. Romulus son of Mars and Ilia reigned for 38 years... with Titus Tatius for 5 years.
2. Numa Pompilius reigned for 41 years
3. Tullus Hostilius reigned 32 years
4. Marius Phillipus reigned for 36 years
5. L. Tarquinius Priscus reigned 28 years
6. Servius Tullius reigned 46 years
7. Tarquinius Superbus reigned 25 years

The Dictators:

1. Publius Cornelius Scipio Africanus
2. [Quintus] Fabius Maximus
3. Apulius Claudius [Caecus]
4. [Publius] Valerius P[o]blicola
5. [Lucius Cornelius] Sulla Felix
6. [Publius Cornelius Scipio] Barbatus
7. [Lucius Quinctius] Cincinnatus
8. Quintus Fabius (?)
9. [Marcus] Lu[v]ius Salinator
10. [Gaius] Iu[n]ius Brutus

Rulership of the Caesars [48 BC–AD 324]

1. C. Julius Caesar ruled 3 years, 7 months, 6 days.
2. Octavian Augustus ruled 56 years, 4 months, 1 day.
3. Tiberius Caesar ruled 22 years, 7 months, 28 days.
4. C. Gallicula ruled 3 years, 8 months, 12 days.
5. Tiberius Claudius ruled 13 years, 8 months, 27 days.
6. Nero ruled 14 years, 5 months, 28 days.
7. Galba ruled 8 months and 12 days
8. Otho ruled 90 days
9. Vitellius ruled 8 months and 11 days.
10. The deified Vespasian ruled 12 years, 8 months, 28 days.
11. The deified Titus ruled ...
12. Domitian ruled 17 years, 5 months, 5 days
13. Nerva ruled 5 years, 4 months, 1 days.
14. Trajan ruled 19 years, 4 months, 27 days
15. Hadrian ruled 20 years, 10 months, 14 days.
16. Antoninus Pius ruled 22 years, 8 months, 28 days
17. The deified Verus ruled 7 years, 8 months, 12 days
18. Marcus Antoninus ruled 18 years, 11 months, 14 days
19. Commodus ruled 16 years, 8 months, 12 days
20. Pertinax ruled 75 days
21. Julianus ruled 65 days
22. The deified Severus ruled 17 years, 11 months, 28 days
23. Geta ruled 10 months and 12 days
24. Antoninus [Caracalla] the Great ruled 6 years, 2 months, 15 days
25. Macrinus rule 1 year, 4 months, 2 days
26. Antoninus Elagaballus ruled 6 years, 8 months, 18 days
27. Alexander ruled 13 years, 8 months and 9 days
28. Maximinus ruled 3 years, 4 months and 2 days
29. The two Gordians ruled for 20 days
30. Pupienus and Balbinus ruled 99 days
31. Gordian [III] ruled 5 years, 5 months and 5 days
32. The two Philips ruled 5 years, 5 months and 29 days
33. Decius ruled 1 year, 11 months and 18 days
34. Gallus and Volusianus ruled 2 years, 4 months and 9 days
35. Aemilianus ruled 88 days
36. Gallienus with Valerian ruled 14 years, 4 months and 28 days
37. Claudius ruled 1 year, 4 months and 14 days
38. Quintillus ruled 77 days
39. Aurelian ruled 5 years, 4 months and 20 days
40. Tacitus ruled 8 months, 12 days
41. Florian ruled 88 days
42. Probus ruled 6 years, 2 months, 12 days
43. Carus ruled 10 months and 5 days
44. Carinus and Numerian ruled 2 years, 11 months, 2 days
45. Diocletian and Maximian ruled 21 years, 11 months, 12 days
46. Constantius and Maximian ruled 16 years, 8 months and 12 days
47. Severus ruled 3 years, 4 months and 15 days
48. Maxentius ruled 6 years
49. Maximian ruled 9 years, 8 months, 6 days.
50. Licinius ruled 15 years, 4 months, 16 days

== See also ==
- Fasti
- Menologia rustica
- On Weights and Measures
- Roman calendar
