= Novus homo =

Political designation in Ancient Rome

Novus homo or homo novus (lit. 'new man'; pl.: novi homines or homines novi) was the term in ancient Rome for a man who was the first in his family to serve in the Roman Senate or, more specifically, to be elected as consul.

== History ==
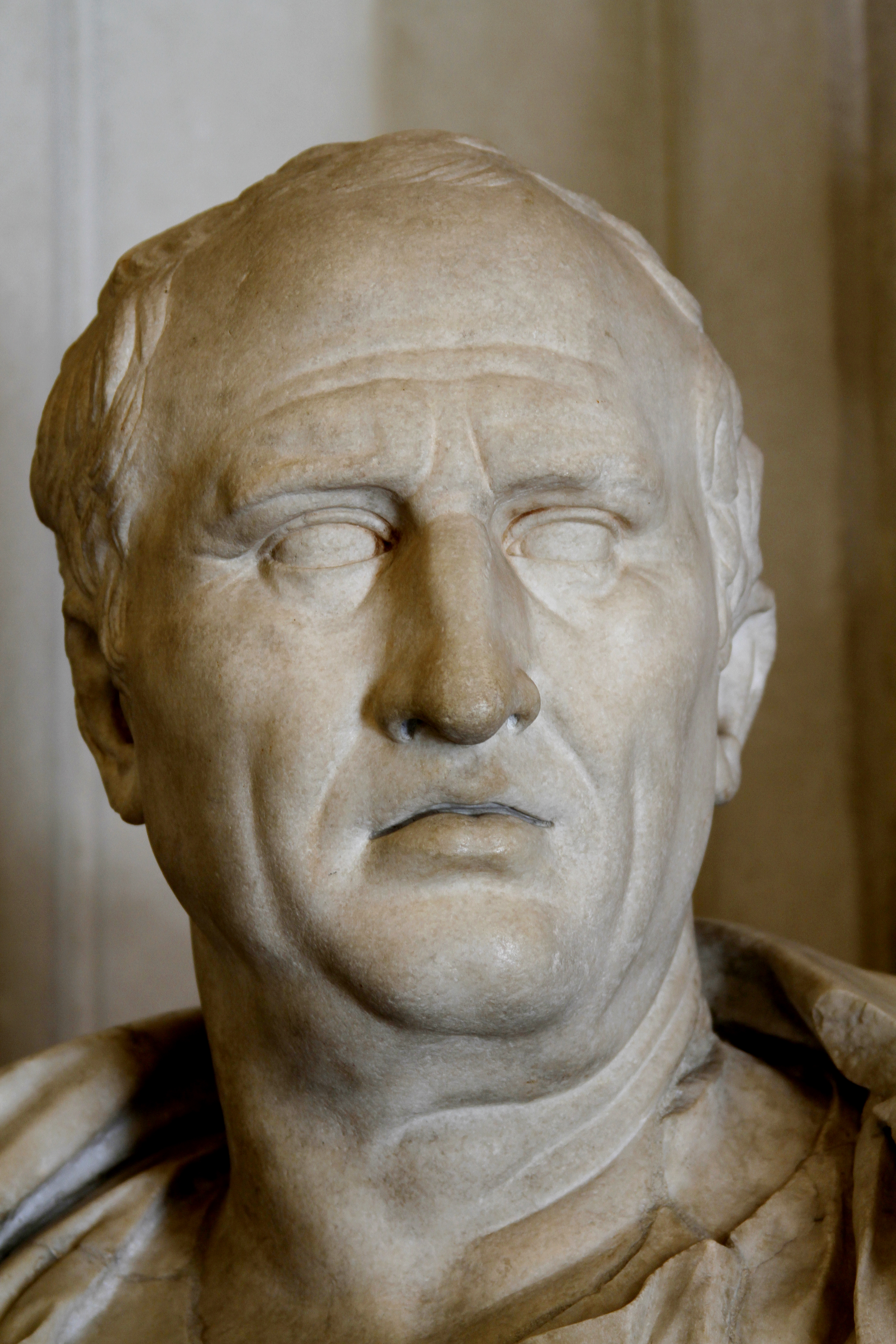
Cicero

In the Early Republic, tradition held that both Senate membership and the consulship were restricted to patricians. When plebeians gained the right to this office during the Conflict of the Orders, all newly elected plebeians were naturally novi homines. With time, novi homines became progressively rarer as some plebeian families became as entrenched in the Senate as their patrician colleagues. By the time of the First Punic War, it was already a sensation that novi homines were elected consuls in two consecutive years (Gaius Fundanius Fundulus in 243 BC and Gaius Lutatius Catulus in 242 BC). In 63 BC, Cicero became the first novus homo to be consul in more than thirty years.

By the Late Republic, the distinction between the orders became less important. The consuls came from a new elite, the nobiles (noblemen), an artificial aristocracy of all who could demonstrate direct descent in the male line from a consul.

== List of notable novi homines ==
- Lucius Sextius Lateranus (cos. 366 BC)
- Gaius Licinius Stolo (cos. 361 BC)
- Marcus Popillius Laenas (cos. 359, 356, 350, 348 BC)
- Gaius Plautius Proculus (cos. 358 BC)
- Gaius Marcius Rutilus (cos. 357, 352, 344, 342 BC)
- Publius Decius Mus (cos. 340 BC)
- Lucius Volumnius Flamma Violens (cos. 307, 296 BC)
- Spurius Carvilius Maximus (cos. 293, 272 BC)
- Manius Curius Dentatus (cos. 290, 275, 274 BC)
- Lucius Caecilius Metellus Denter (cos. 284 BC)
- Gaius Fabricius Luscinus (cos. 282, 278 BC)
- Manius Otacilius Crassus (cos. 263 BC)
- Gaius Duilius (cos. 260 BC)
- Gaius Aurelius Cotta (cos. 252, 248 BC)
- Gaius Fundanius Fundulus (cos. 243 BC)
- Gaius Lutatius Catulus (cos. 242 BC)
- Gaius Flaminius (cos. 223 BC and 217 BC)
- Marcus Porcius Cato (the Censor/Elder) (cos. 195 BC)
- Gaius Calpurnius Piso (cos. 180 BC)
- Gnaeus Octavius (cos. 165 BC)
- Lucius Mummius Achaicus (cos. 146 BC)
- Quintus Pompeius (cos. 141 BC)
- Gaius Marius (cos. 107, 104–100, 86 BC)
- Gnaeus Mallius Maximus (cos. 105 BC)
- Titus Didius (cos. 98 BC)
- Gaius Coelius Caldus (cos. 94 BC)
- Gnaeus Pompeius Strabo (cos. 89 BC)
- Marcus Tullius Cicero (cos. 63 BC)
- Marcus Vinicius (appointed suffect consul 19 BC)

== Topos of the "new man" ==
The literary theme of homo novus, or "how the lowly born but inherently worthy man may properly rise to eminence in the world" was the topos of Seneca's influential Epistle XLIV. At the endpoint of Late Antiquity, it was likewise a subject in Boethius' Consolation of Philosophy (iii, vi). In the Middle Ages Dante's Convivio (book IV) and Petrarch's De remediis utriusque fortunae (I.16; II.5) take up the subject, and Chaucer's "Wife of Bath's Tale".

In its Christian renderings, the theme suggested a tension in the scala naturae or great chain of being, one that was produced through the agency of Man's free will.

The theme came naturally to Renaissance humanists who were often homines novi rising by their own wits in a network of noble courts that depended on the highly literate new men to run increasingly complicated chancelries and create the cultural propaganda that was a contemporary vehicle for noble fame, and that consequently offered a kind of intellectual cursus honorum. In the fifteenth century Buonaccorso da Montemagno's Dialogus de vera nobilitate treated of the "true nobility" inherent in the worthy individual; Poggio Bracciolini also wrote at length De nobilitate, stressing the Renaissance view of human responsibility and effectiveness that are at the heart of Humanism: sicut virtutis ita et nobilitatis sibi quisque existit auctor et opifex.

Briefer summaries of the theme were to be found in Francesco Patrizi, De institutionae republicae (VI.1), and in Rodrigo Sánchez de Arévalo's encyclopedic Speculum vitae humanae. In the sixteenth century these and new texts came to be widely printed and distributed. Sánchez de Arévalo's Speculum was first printed at Rome, 1468, and there are more than twenty fifteenth-century printings; German, French and Spanish translations were printed. The characters of Baldassare Castiglione's The Book of the Courtier (1528) discuss the requirement that a cortegiano be noble (I.XIV-XVI). This was translated into French, Spanish, English, Latin and other languages. Jerónimo Osório da Fonseca's De nobilitate (Lisbon 1542, and seven reprintings in the sixteenth century), stressing propria strennuitas ("one's own determined striving") received an English translation in 1576.

The Roman figure most often cited as an exemplum is Gaius Marius, whose speech of self-justification was familiar to readers from the set-piece in Sallust's Bellum Jugurthinum, 85; the most familiar format in the Renaissance treatises is a dialogue that contrasts the two sources of nobility, with the evidence weighted in favor of the "new man".

== See also ==
- New men
- New Man (utopian concept)
- Homo Ludens
- Homo Sovieticus
- Nouveau riche
- Iliad – the first example of the common man in literature
- Heroic fantasy – sources Roman and Greek literature for virtus and the common man
- New Soviet man – Archetype of the ideal Soviet citizen
