= Poplicola (cognomen) =

Publius Valerius Poplicola was a Roman aristocrat who helped overthrow the Roman monarchy in the 6th century BC.

Poplicola, may also refer to:

- Lucius Gellius Poplicola (fl. 43–31 BC), a senator who fought for Mark Antony
- Lucius Valerius Poplicola Potitus (fl. 450-446 BC), a patrician who opposed the Second Decemvirate
- Lucius Vipstanus Poplicola Messalla (c. 10-59 AD), a senator
- Marcus Valerius Poplicola (fl. 355-353 BC), a magister equitum
- Publius Valerius Poplicola (dictator) (fl. 4th century BC), a dictator
- Publius Valerius Poplicola (consul 475 BC) (died 460 BC), a consul
- Quintus Pedius Poplicola (fl. 1st century BC)
