= Battle of Pedum (358 BC) =

Battle between the Roman Republic and Gallic tribes

- Part of Roman-Gaulish Wars
Date	358 BC
Location	Pedum in Latium, Italy
Result	Roman victory

Belligerents
Roman Republic	Gauls

Commanders and leaders
Gaius Sulpicius Peticus; Marcus Valerius Poplicola	Unknown

Strength
2 consular armies; about 40,000	Unknown

The Battle of Pedum was fought in 358 BC, near Pedum between the Roman Republic and a group of Gauls who had entered Latium. The Romans, led by dictator Gaius Sulpicius Peticus and his magister equitum, Marcus Valerius Poplicola, defeated the Gauls at their encampment near Pedum after a prolonged standoff.

== Background ==
News of Gallic tribes in Latium had been common towards the end of 359 BC. Upon hearing news of a force of Gauls entering Latium and encamping near Pedum, the Romans resolved to appoint Gaius Sulpicius Peticus as dictator, who, along with his magister equitum, Marcus Valerius Poplicola, quickly set off for Pedum in anticipation of an easy victory.

Upon reaching Pedum, Peticus, to the displeasure of his men, ordered that no soldier be permitted to attack without his command. Peticus's men soon began publicly voicing their distaste for the dictator's orders. The opposition culminated when Sextus Tullius, one of Peticus's senior centurions, delivered a speech to his men, denouncing Peticus's choice and effectively convincing Peticius to engage with the Gauls.

== Battle ==
Skirmishing began between Romans and Gauls shortly after Tullius's address, prompting Peticus to formulate a strategy. Peticus decided to send a mix of muleteers and cavalry atop a nearby mountain, and lined up the rest of his forces along the plains near base of the mountain. The Gauls were quick to attack after they spotted the Romans descending the mountain, but the move ultimately resulted in disorder, and the Romans were able to rout both the right and left flanks of the Gaulish forces, driving them to retreat. At this, Peticus ordered his cavalry and muleteers to intercept the fleeing Gallic army.

== Aftermath ==
Peticus, Poplicola, and the Roman force returned to Rome with a considerable amount of gold taken from the Gallic camps. The spoils were brought to the Capitoline Hill and consecrated.
