= Marcus Popilius Laenas =

Marcus Popilius Laenas is the name of two Roman consuls

- Marcus Popillius Laenas (consul 173 BC)
- Marcus Popillius Laenas (consul 359 BC)
