= Battle of Pedum =

The Battle of Pedum may refer to either of two battles fought by the Roman Republic in the 4th century BC:

- Battle of Pedum (358 BC), fought against a group of Gauls who had entered Latium
- Battle of Pedum (338 BC), fought against the forces of several cities in Latium, effectively the last major conflict in the Latin War
