= Gaius Licinius Calvus =

First ever plebeian master of the horse in 368 BC

Gaius Licinius Calvus was a Roman politician from the plebeian Licinia gens in the fourth century BC.

== Family ==
His grandfather was Publius Licinius Calvus Esquilinus, serving as consular tribune between 400 BC and 396 BC.

== Career ==
In 368 BC, Licinius became the first plebeian Magister equitum and was made dictator by Publius Manlius Capitolinus during the battles of the plebeian consulship.

In 364 he himself held the consulship and was the colleague of Gaius Sulpicius Peticus. That year, Rome was once again attacked by plague. And so the first Ludi Romani were established to appease the gods.
