= Gaius Aemilius Mamercus =

5th-century BC Roman statesman and possibly dictator

- Dictator of the Roman Republic (Disputed)
- Reign: 463 BC

Gaius Aemilius Mamercus was a Roman statesman who may have served as Dictator in 463 BC.

== Historical divergence ==
No dictator is listed for this year in the fasti consulares, but Lydus says that there was a Dictator in the forty-eighty year of the republic. Bendel links this with the story that the senate appointed a Dictator clavi figendi causa in 363 BC because that had worked to stop a pestilence a century earlier and concludes that Mamercus was this Dictator. Broughton sees this as an insufficient reason to say that Mamercus was dictator in 463 BC, and suggests that Lydus has confused a Dictator with an Interrex.
