= Appius Claudius Crassus Inregillensis =

4th-century BC Roman politician and general

- Died: 349 BC
- Office: Dictator (362 BC); Consul (349 BC)
- Children: Gaius Claudius Inregillensis

Appius Claudius Crassus Inregillensis (died c. 349 BC) was a Roman politician and general. According to the historian Livy, he delivered a speech to the senate in 368 BC unsuccessfully opposing the proposal to open the executive office of consul to plebeians. In 362, after the plebeian consul of that year had been killed in battle, Claudius was nominated dictator and campaigned against the Hernici, obtaining some successes but with heavy losses of his own. He died shortly after taking office as consul in 349.

Claudius Crassus was probably the father of Gaius Claudius Inregillensis, dictator in 337 BC, and thus grandfather of the censor Appius Claudius Caecus.

== Scholarship ==
Most of the historical events ascribed to his life have been questioned. Oakley rejects the historicity of Claudius's speech in 368 BC, asserting that neither Livy nor his sources would have had any authentic evidence of it, and he also notes that the Claudian family's opposition to the rights of plebeians is a recurring stereotype in Roman tradition. Oakley also found Claudius's dictatorship in 362 dubious, but Ferenczy accepted both the office and the campaign against the Hernici as historical. Some authors have also questioned the authenticity of the consulship in 349.

The historian Livy identifies Claudius, the consul in 349 BC, with Appius Claudius Crassus, consular tribune in 403 BC. Wiseman finds such a career length unlikely, and Münzer suggested that the literary tradition has confused two different two Appii Claudii. According to the Fasti Capitolini, a list of magistrates compiled during the time of Emperor Augustus, both the tribune and the consul were sons of Publius and grandsons of Appius, but only the consul is given the surname 'Inregillensis'.

== Endnotes ==
Preceded by Marcus Popillius Laenas III; Lucius Cornelius Scipio	Roman consul 349 BC; With: Lucius Furius Camillus	Succeeded by Marcus Valerius Corvus; Marcus Popillius Laenas IV
