= Publius Manlius Capitolinus =

4th-century BC Roman politician and dictator

Dictator of the Roman Republic
- In office 368 BC
- Preceded by: Marcus Furius Camillus
- Succeeded by: Marcus Furius Camillus

Military service
- Allegiance: Roman Republic

Publius Manlius Capitolinus was a Roman statesman who served as Dictator in 368 BC.

== Family ==
A member of the patrician gens Manlia, Capitolinus was the brother of Marcus Manlius Capitolinus, consul in 392 BC.

== Career ==
In 368 BC, Capitolinus succeeded Marcus Furius Camillus as Dictator, who was forced to step down by the tribunes. Capitolinus successfully brokered a settlement between the plebeians and patricians. He appointed either Gaius Licinius Calvus or Gaius Licinius Stolo as Magister Equitum, the first plebeian to hold the office.

== See also ==
- Manlia (gens)

Political offices
| Preceded by Marcus Furius Camillus | Dictator of the Roman Republic; 368 BC | Succeeded by Marcus Furius Camillus |
