= Publius Cornelius Maluginensis Scipio (consular tribune 395 BC) =

Early 4th-century BC Roman politician

Publius Cornelius Scipio was an ancient Roman politician. Regarded as the first Scipio, his filiation, P. f M. n, mean that he is the son of a Publius, the son of a Marcus. He may have had the name “Maluginensis” in his name, making him possibly the son of Publius Cornelius Maluginensis, the Consular Tribune of 404 BC and the grandson of Marcus Cornelius Maluginensis, the Consul of 436 BC. He was the Magister Equitum of the dictator Marcus Furius Camillus in 396 BC, and served as Consular Tribune in 395 BC. He may have also served in 394 BC, as an unknown “Publius Cornelius” is known to have served. He had two children, Publius Cornelius Scipio, who was the Magister Equitum of the dictator Lucius Furius Camillus, probably the son of Marcus Furius Camillus, in 350 BC. His other son was Lucius Cornelius Scipio, who served as Consul in 350 BC. He is an ancestor to many Roman politicians, most notably Scipio Africanus.

Political offices
Preceded by L. Titinius Pansa Saccus, Q. Manlius Vulso Capitolinus, P. Licinius Calvus Esquilinus, Cn. Genucius Augurinus, P. Maelius Capitolinus, L. Atilius Priscus	Consular Tribune of the Roman Republic with P. Cornelius Cossus, L. Furius Medullinus, Q. Servilius Fidenas, K. Fabius Ambustus III, and M. Valerius Lactucinus Maximus; 395 BC	Succeeded by M. Furius Camillus, L. Valerius Potitus Poplicola, L. Furius Medullinus, Sp. Postumius Albinus Regillensis, C. Aemilius Mamercinus, and P. Cornelius Scipio
Preceded by P. Cornelius Cossus, P. Cornelius Scipio II, Q. Servilius Fidenas, K. Fabius Ambustus III, and M. Valerius Lactucinus Maximus	Consular Tribune of the Roman Republic with M. Furius Camillus, L. Valerius Potitus Poplicola, Sp. Postumius Albinus Regillensis, C. Aemilius Mamercinus, and L. Furius Medullinus; 394 BC	Succeeded by L. Valerius Potitus Poplicola; Ser. Cornelius Maluginensis
