= Fasti =

Roman annals listing the names of magistrates and important events

In ancient Rome, the fasti (Latin plural) were chronological or calendar-based lists, or other diachronic records or plans of official and religiously sanctioned events. After Rome's decline, the word fasti continued to be used for similar records in Christian Europe and later Western culture.

Public business, including the official business of the Roman state, had to be transacted on dies fasti, "allowed days". The fasti were the records of this business. In addition to the word's general sense, there were fasti that recorded specific kinds of events, such as the fasti triumphales, lists of triumphs celebrated by Roman generals. The divisions of time used in the fasti were based on the Roman calendar.

The yearly records of the fasti encouraged the writing of history in the form of chronological annales, "annals", which in turn influenced the development of Roman historiography.

== Etymology ==
Fasti is the plural of the Latin adjective fastus, most commonly used as a substantive. The word derives from fas, meaning "that which is permitted", that is, "that which is legitimate in the eyes of the gods." Fasti dies were the days on which business might be transacted without impiety, in contrast to dies nefasti, days on which assemblies and courts could not convene. The word fasti itself came to denote lists organized by time. The temporal structure distinguished fasti from regesta, which were simple lists of property, or assets, such as land or documents, or transactions transferring property.

== Roman official chronicles ==
Fasti Magistrales, Annales or Historici, were concerned with the several festivals, and everything relating to religious practice and the gods, and the magistrates; to the emperors, their birthdays, offices, days consecrated to them, with feasts and ceremonies established in their honor or for their prosperity. They came to be denominated magni, "great", by way of distinction from the bare calendar, or fasti diurni ("everyday records"). The word fasti thus came to be used in the general sense of annals or historical records.

=== Fasti consulares ===
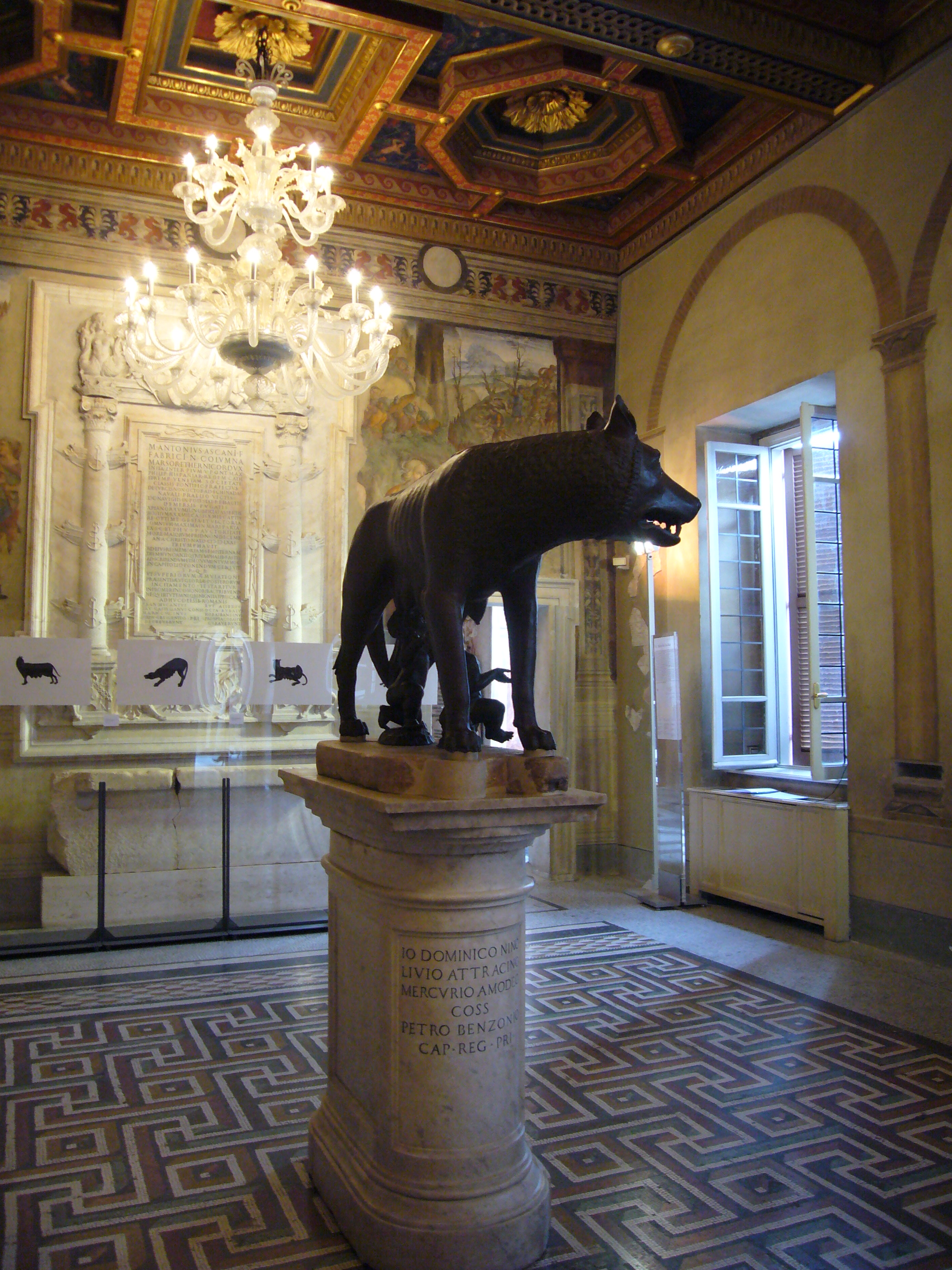
The Sala della Lupa in the Palazzo dei Conservatori on the Capitoline Hill, with the lupa in the foreground and behind her an entablature of fasti capitolini, one of several in the hall

Fasti consulares were official chronicles in which years were denoted by the respective consuls and other magistrates, often with the principal events that happened during their consulates, but sometimes not. An example is the fasti Capitolini, a modern name assigned because they were deposited in 1547 in the courtyard of the Palazzo dei Conservatori on the Capitoline Hill on order of Alessandro Farnese, who kept them temporarily in his villa after their excavation from the Roman forum in 1545 or 1546 (funded by Farnese). Michelangelo, who designed the complex of three palaces on the hill, also restored the tables of the fasti. The Palazzo today is one of the Capitoline Museums, which serve a double duty as museums and city government buildings. The fasti are located in the Sala della Lupa, the same room as the bronze wolf. More pieces discovered after the Renaissance were placed with it.

==== Discovery ====
The fasti consulares were discovered as 30 marble fragments in the forum. With them were 26 fragments of Acta Triumpharum, since called the fasti triumphales. Both lists were restored as distinct records. The restoration was based nearly entirely on the observations of Onofrio Panvinio and Pirro Ligorio, who were standing at the top of the trench in which a portion of wall was showing, featuring inscriptional material between pilasters. They conferred with Michelangelo. Pope Paul III had authorized the mining of stone for St. Peter's in 1540 and Michelangelo was in fact protestingly working on its design also. The pope was following the widespread convention that prevailed in the Renaissance of ripping up the structures of the past to reuse in building structures they considered even more magnificent. The scholars were collaborating to save what they could.

A resident colony of quarrymen did not pause in the slightest but went on dismantling buildings. All trace of structures in that part of the forum vanished between August 15 and September 14, 1546. The stone was sold to cutters for reuse or to lime burners for the creation of cement. None of these proceedings were in any way archaeological. Cardinal Farnese assigned the scholars to watch the diggings. Collecting a team they moved swiftly to rescue what they could, sinking tunnels to the side to search for fragments. Subsequently, more fragments turned up embedded in buildings then in use, showing that the area had been less intensely mined previously, and casting doubt of the location of the original source of the fragments.

It has been estimated that the consular lists were in four entablatures several feet high: I covering AUC 1-364; II, 365-461; III, 462-600; IV, 601-745, running to 766 in the margin. They were not published, however, as two lists; instead, Marliani in 1549 (first publication, Rome), Sigonius in 1550 (Modena), Robortelli in 1555 (Venice) and others chose to combine the information into a unified list, which was carried forward under the name fasti capitolini. The editors took certain freedoms, such as filling in missing magistrates from other records as they thought best and filling in missing dates AUC to give the appearance of a continuous yearly chronicle, at the same time concealing the problems. Typically representations under the name capitolini are not that. There were in fact two different original lists placed under that name to which were added fragments found in 1816-1818, 1872–1878 and a final one from the Tiber river in 1888, unrestored. All the fragments became CIL I under Fragmenta Quae Dicuntur Capitolini, "Fragments Called Capitolini" and Cetera Quae Supersunt Fragmenta, "Other Remaining Fragments."

==== Content ====
The unified list states the magistrates for each AUC from the first year of the first king to the death of Augustus. The marble entablatures were erected at the order of Augustus, based on information available to the Romans then, although the nature and validity of this information remains unknown. The degree of detail suggests that they were based on previous republican chronicles. The identification of their ancient location is controversial. The two theories are that they were in or part of the regia, or palace, of the College of Pontiffs, or that they were on a commemorative arch Augustus had constructed.

The fasti state a list of kings followed by the republican consuls for each year, with the magistri equitum and the tribuni militares for years in which these magistrates were eponymous instead of consuls; that is, once the practice of naming the year after the heads of state began, there had to be a head of state whether king, dictator, consul, master or tribune, regardless of what body held the power. The list features multiple dating schemes. To the right are years from the beginning of the republic preceded by an. or ann. for anno, "in the year." To the left every ten years is a numeral stating the AUC year starting with CCXC (the editors typically fill out these schemes; the list is seldom quoted as it is). The length of reign is given for the kings (the sum does not match the first republican AUC). In addition 5-year lustrations ("purgation", a ceremony cleansing the city of sin) and the censors conducting them are stated, which list is sometimes called the fasti censorii by moderns and stated as a third fasti capitolini.

Feeney argues that the multiple scheme is evidence that the fasti were Augustan rather than republican. The kings are given precedence at the top and the AUC at the left as though they were superimposed on a formerly republican fasti. Moreover, the 5-year lustra date to 28 BC when the temple of Mars Ultor ("Mars the Avenger"), the imperial god, was constructed and took precedence over the temple of Jupiter on the Capitoline. After that time the emperor must be one of the censors, who now presided over banging in the yearly nail at Mars Ultor instead of Jupiter (the setting of this nail marked the transition of the year).

==== Dating ====
The republican dates given to the right are those of the Varronian chronology; that is, those calculated by the scholar, Marcus Terentius Varro. His republic begins in the year 510/509 BC by modern calculation. These were the official imperial dates. Many other dates and chronologies existed, notably those of Livy, with which the emperor must have been familiar, but he did not forbid their use in unofficial contexts. The AUC chronology does not exactly correspond; it is later than the Varronian by a year. Censorinus, who went over Varro's calculations, he says, explains that Ulpius and Pontianus were consuls in the 1014th year from the re-founding of the Olympic games (776 BC); that is, Olympiad 254.2 (second year of the 254th Olympiad) and that this year was AUC 991, starting by modern calculations January 1, 238 AD. Varro's AUC 1 therefore was 754/753 BC. The identities of Ulpius and Pontianus remain a mystery, as they are only named by Censorinus, but the names are irrelevant to the argument. The republic began in Varro's view in AUC 245 (509 BCE).

Solinus observed that Gaius Pompeius Gallus and Quintus Verranius were consuls in Olympiad 207.1, and that this year was 801 AUC, counting from the foundation of Rome at Olympiad 7.1. By modern calculation this is 49 AD. He was relying on the official dating scheme, which must have been the fasti consulares. In Varro's chronology this is AUC 802. Simple subtraction shows that AUC 1 in Augustus' fasti is 753/752 BC. The fasti give to the start of the republic a date of AUC 244 (510 BCE), but some editors "correct" all the AUC to Varronian. Similarly the fasti run to the death of Augustus in 13 AD (14 in the Varronian). This is not a difference in the starting date of the republic or the year of Augustus' death, which remain in the same years relative to surrounding events in either case; instead, the year of AUC 1 differs.

=== Fasti triumphales ===
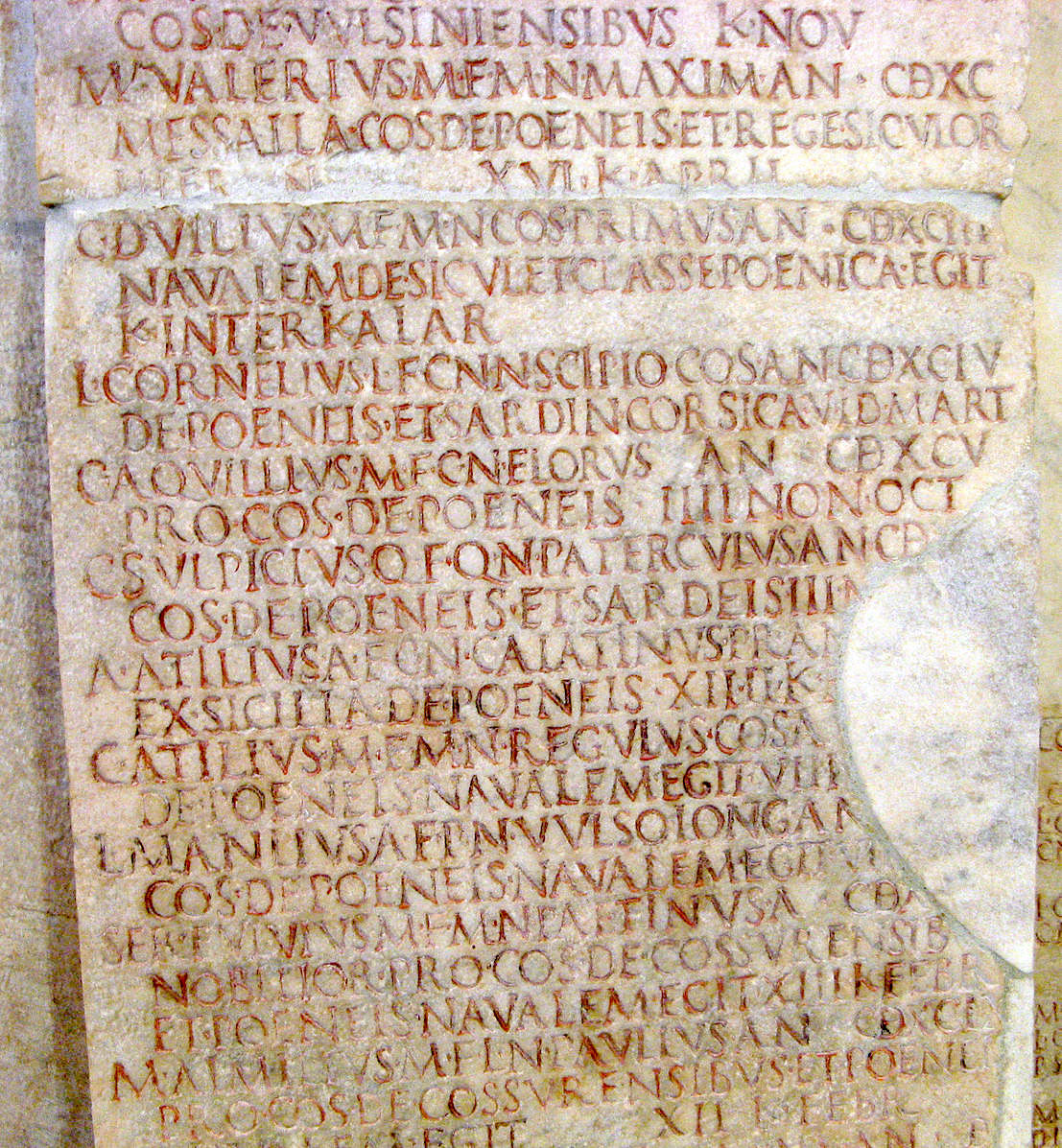
Segment XX of the Fasti triumphales, a portion recording triumphs during the First Punic War

The Fasti Triumphales contained a list in chronological order of persons who had obtained a triumph, together with the name of the conquered people. Fragments of such a list were found mixed in with the fragments of the fasti capitolini, were also restored by Michelangelo and are in the same room at the Palazzo dei Conservatori. The acta triumphorum were on four panels, I covering AUC 1-452; II, 453-532; III, 533-625 and IV, 628-735, ending in 19 BC. The triumphs begin with those of Romulus.

The fragmentary Fasti Triumphales were unearthed together with the Fasti Capitolini, and partially restored. Renaissance antiquarian Onofrio Panvinio's De fasti et triumphi Romanorum a Romulo usque ad Carolum V, Giacomo Strada, Venice, 1557, continued where the ancient Fasti left off. The last triumph recorded by Panvinio, which he described as a Roman triumph "over the infidel," was the Royal Entry of the Holy Roman Emperor Charles V into Rome on April 5, 1536, which took place while Charles was marching northward after his conquest of Tunis in 1535.

=== Fasti Potentini ===
The Fasti Potentini is a list of consuls from Potentia in Lucania, and probably dating to the early second century. The Potentini gives a partial record of the consuls from AD 86 to 93, and from 112 to 116.

=== Priestly fasti ===
The Annales Pontificum or Annales maximi, "Annals of the Priests", were annually exhibited in public on a white table, on which the memorable events of the year, with special mention of the prodigies, were set down in abbreviated manner. Other fasti sacerdotales ("priestly fasti") include the fasti augurales of the augurs.

=== Fasti Diurni ===
Fasti Diurni, divided into urbani and rustici, were a kind of official year-book, with dates and directions for religious ceremonies, court-days, market-days, divisions of the month, and the like. Until 304 BC the lore of the calendaria remained the exclusive and lucrative monopoly of the priesthood; but in that year Gnaeus Flavius, a pontifical secretary, introduced the custom of publishing in the forum tables containing the requisite information, besides brief references to victories, triumphs, prodigies, etc. This list was the origin of the public Roman calendar, in which the days were divided into weeks of eight days each, and indicated by the letters A–H. Each day was marked by a certain letter to show its nature; thus the letters F., N., N.P., F.P., Q. Rex C.F., C., EN., stood for fastus, nefastus, nefastus in some unexplained sense, fastus priore, quando rex (sacrorum) comitiavit fastus, comitialis and intercisus. The dies intercisi were partly fasti and partly nefasti. Ovid's Fasti is a poetical description of the Roman festivals of the first six months, written to illustrate the Fasti published by Julius Caesar after he remodelled the Roman year. Upon the cultivators fewer feasts, sacrifices, ceremonies and holidays were enjoined than on the inhabitants of cities; and the rustic fasti contained little more than the ceremonies of the calends, nones and ides, the fairs, signs of zodiac, increase and decrease of the days, the tutelary gods of each month, and certain directions for rustic labours to be performed each month.

== Extant fasti ==
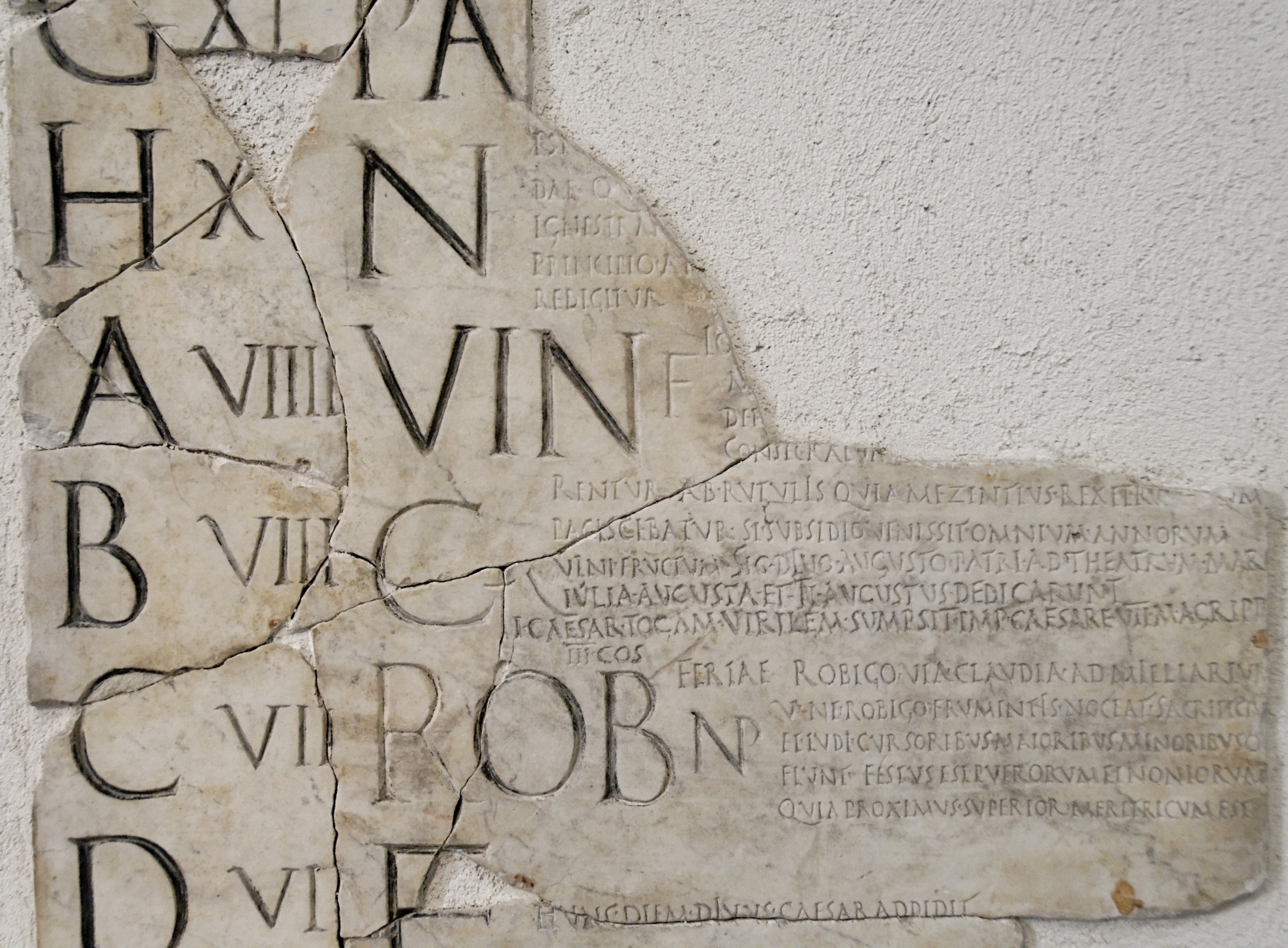
A section of the Fasti Praenestini, with the entry on the "Feast of Robigus" (bottom right)

A considerable number of fasti have been discovered. The Praenestine calendar (Fasti praenestini), discovered in 1770, arranged by the famous grammarian Verrius Flaccus, contains the months of January, March, April, and December, and a portion of February. The tablets give an account of festivals, and also of the triumphs of Augustus and Tiberius. There are two complete calendars in existence, an official list by Philocalus (354), and a Christian version of the official calendar, made by Polemius Silvius (448).

== Modern fasti ==
In modern times the word fasti and its reflexes in modern languages have been used formally for quasi-official writings of a diachronic character. Some examples are the official history and traditions of a regiment, in Scotland the Fasti Ecclesiae Scoticanae: the succession of ministers in the Church of Scotland from the reformation, the first volume of which was produced in 1915 and which is still updated at irregular intervals. Between 1946 and 1987 the International Association for Classical Archaeology (AIAC) published the Fasti Archaeologici. It contained summary notices of excavations through the area of the Roman Empire. The Fasti went online and discontinued paper publication in 2000: the Fasti Online now contains reports on excavations since the year 2000 in 13 countries, particularly Italy, Bulgaria, Romania, Macedonia, Malta and Albania. It is accompanied by an online journal, Fasti Online Documents & Research, which publishes full and interim reports on archaeological sites in Italy. See under "External links" below.

== In popular culture ==
The HBO television series Rome features a pontiff calling out the fasti in the Forum at the beginning of each episode.

== See also ==
- Menologia rustica
- Chronography of 354
- Julian calendar
- List of Roman consuls
- Roman calendar
- Roman festivals

== Bibliography ==
- Feeney, Denis (2008). Caesar's Calendar: Ancient Time and the Beginnings of History. Berkeley, Los Angeles, London: University of California Press. ISBN 978-0-520-25119-9.
- Greswell, Edward (1854). Origines Kalendariae Italicae. Vol. I. Oxford: University Press.
- Hooke, Nathaniel (1823). "The Capitoline Marbles; or, Consular Calendars: an Ancient Monument". The Roman History from the Building of Rome to the Ruin of the Commonwealth Illustrated with Maps. Vol. VI (new ed.). London: C & J Rivington, etc. pp. 369–484.
- Sigonii, Caroli. Fasti Consulares ac Triumphi Acti a Romulo Rege usque as Ti. Caesarem. Eisusdem in Fastos et Triumphos, Id Est in Universam Romanam Historiam Commentarius (in Latin). Venetiis, MDLVI: Apud Paulum Manutium, Aldi F.
- Sigonii, Caroli. Fasti Consulares ac Triumphi Acti a Romulo Rege usque as Ti. Caesarem. Eisusdem in Fastos et Triumphos, Id Est in Universam Romanam Historiam Commentarius (in Latin). Hanoviae, MDCIX: Apud Claudium Marnium & heredes Ioan. Aubrii.
