= Gaius Plautius Proculus =

4th-century BC Roman senator and consul

Gaius Plautius Proculus was the first member of the gens Plautia to achieve consular rank.

Little is known of his life before becoming consul with Gaius Fabius Ambustus in 358 BC, although there is some archaeological evidence that his family came from Privernum. At the same time Gaius Sulpicius Peticus was made consul to deal with a Gaulish threat. The two consuls led their armies against other opponents, Fabius against the Etruscans and Plautius against raids made by the Privernates and the Hernici. Although Fabius suffered a defeat in Etruria, Plautius was successful over his opponents, and after a second defeat in the following year, Privernum entered an alliance with Rome.

In 356 BC, Plautius was appointed Magister Equitum to the first plebeian Dictator, Gaius Marcius Rutilus. Nicola Terrenato interprets this as a signal that the Plautii were at the forefront of the plebeian push for more power, pointing out evidence that "it is not hard to see a political partnership between" Plautius and Rutilus.

Political offices
Preceded by Marcus Popillius Laenas and Gnaeus Manlius Capitolinus Imperiosus	Consul of the Roman Republic; 358 BC with Gaius Fabius Ambustus	Succeeded by Gaius Marcius Rutilus and Gnaeus Manlius Capitolinus Imperiosus II
