= Battle of the Anio River (361 BC) =

Battle between the Romans and a group of Gauls

- Part of Roman–Gallic wars
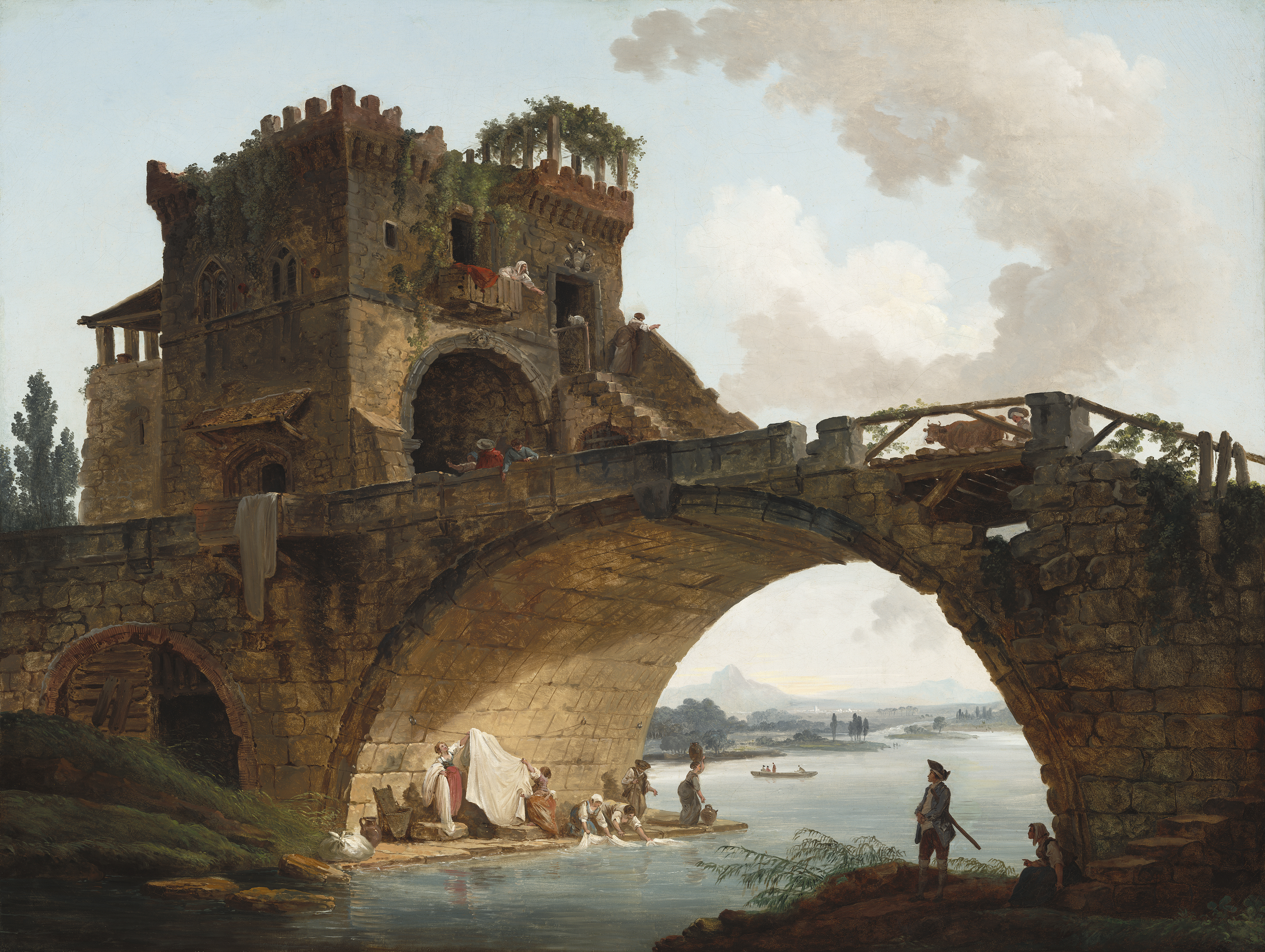
- An 18th century depiction of the Ponte Salario, the point at which the Via Salaria crosses over the Anio River
Date	361 BC
Location	Via Salaria and Anio River, Italy
Result	Roman victory

Belligerents
Roman Republic	Gauls

Commanders and leaders
Titus Quinctius Pennus Capitolinus Crispinus	

Strength
Unknown	Unknown

Casualties and losses
Unknown	Unknown

The Battle of the Anio River was fought in 361 BC between the Roman Republic, led by the dictator Titus Quinctius Pennus Capitolinus Crispinus, and a group of Gauls who had encamped near the Via Salaria beyond the bridge over the Anio River.

== Background ==
Titus Quinctius Pennus Capitolinus Crispinus was appointed dictator in 361 BC, most likely due to the presence of Gauls and their proximity to Rome. They had encamped on the side of the Anio River farthest from the city near the Via Salaria, roughly 3 km north of the Colline Gate. Upon being appointed dictator, Crispinus ordered that the courts be suspended and that all men of military qualifications join him to march north to the river. The army then encamped on the side of the river opposite the Gauls.

== Battle ==
Skirmishing began over possession of the bridge that crossed the river, but it yielded no results as both sides were evenly matched. It continued on until a large Gaul came to the bridge, demanding that the Romans send their bravest man to fight him so that the standoff could be resolved. The Romans did not respond to his requests until Titus Manlius Imperiosus Torquatus approached the dictator and volunteered himself. He confronted the Gaul, who was much larger and more well-armed than he. Manlius managed to parry all of the Gaul's strokes. He exploited the Gaul's size and snuck between his sword and body, leaving himself unexposed and delivering a decisive blow to his groin and stomach, killing his enemy and therefore deciding the result of the battle.

== Aftermath ==
Manlius was given the honorary cognomen Torquatus, meaning "adorned with a neck chain or collar," a reference to Celtic torques necklace which was borne by the Gaul Manlius killed. The Gauls retreated east from the bridge to the town of Tibur, where they formed a military alliance with the Tiburtes, who provided them with supplies. From there, they entered Campania.
