= Publius Cornelius Scipio (magister equitum 350 BC) =

Publius Cornelius Scipio was a politician of the Roman Republic of the 4th century BC. He served as Magister equitum in 350 BC.

== Family ==
He was a member of the gens Cornelia and was the son of Publius Cornelius Maluginensis Scipio, who had served as consular tribune in 395 BC.

His brother was Lucius Cornelius Scipio, consul in 350 BC. Lucius Scipio was an ancestor of Lucius Cornelius Scipio Barbatus and the later Cornelii Scipiones.

== Career ==
In 366 BC, Publius Cornelius Scipio became the first curule Aedile, an office that only patricians could hold, as a result of plebeians being admitted into the higher offices, a year earlier.

In 350 BC, he was appointed as Magister equitum by the Dictator, Lucius Furius Camillus.
