= Publius Valerius Poplicola (dictator) =

Roman senator

Publius Valerius Poplicola was a Roman politician and general in the mid 4th century BC who served as Roman Consul, Praetor, Dictator, and Magister Equitum during his career.

== Family ==
Poplicola was a member of the patrician Valerii family, a clan which was very influential throughout the Republican period of the Roman state, and one which even retained their relevance some decades into the Empire. This Valerius was a member of the Poplicolae branch of the family which was descended from the identically named Publius Valerius Poplicola, who was an instrumental figure in the foundation of the Republic. In terms of his more immediate family, his filiation reveals that he was the son of a Publius and grandson of a Lucius, and thus was probably either the nephew or the cousin of Marcus Valerius Poplicola, another relatively influential politician of the time.

== Consulship and Praetorship ==
In 352 BC, Valerius was consul alongside Gaius Marcius Rutilus, with their election being the cause of much dissension. In 367 BC, it became required by law that one of the two consuls for each year be a plebeian, however the patrician class, who were still far more powerful than the plebeians, resisted following this law whenever possible, instead opting to have two patrician consuls elected in flagrant violation of the law in the years that they felt they could do so without much difficulty. In 353 BC, the tribunes of the plebs, fearing that the patricians were going to attempt to elect two of their own kind yet again, threatened to use their tribunician powers to veto any election from occurring unless the patricians vowed to obey the law. In office at the time was a patrician dictator, Titus Manlius Imperiosus Torquatus, who doubled down, refusing to allow any elections to occur if a plebeian stood for office. This standstill came to an end when the term of the dictator expired and he resigned, at which point the Senate allowed the election to be held in observance of the law, for fear that if they did not do so there would be great anger among the common people. Thus Valerius was elected alongside the plebeian Gaius Marcius, and in 352 BC they took office. Upon becoming consuls, Valerius and Marcius made it a priority to alleviate and discharge the debts of the commoners in order to assuage them. The consuls appointed five men for the purpose of acting on this priority, who in doing so became renowned both in the justice and fairness by which they conducted their duty, as well as in the effectiveness that they were able to achieve their aim. As a result of this, the debts of the Roman people as a whole decreased significantly.

In 350 BC, Valerius was made praetor, a title which although inferior to the consulship in both prestige and imperium, was sometimes held by ex consuls in this early period in the title's history. In this year, Rome was beset by a very large army of hostile Gauls, and in reaction to this, the consul Marcus Popillius Laenas levied all young Roman men he could muster, as the Romans had a very particular fear of Gauls as a result of the Gallic sack of Rome forty years prior. Popillius took four legions' worth of men with him personally to fight the Gauls as an initial force, leaving the remainder under the command of Valerius as praetor to lead as reserves in case they were needed in a later battle against the Gauls or to combat another outside threat if they attacked Rome. These reserves were not needed however, as no other foreign enemy attacked and Popillius achieved victory against the Gauls.

== Dictatorship and Magister Equitum ==
In 344 BC, a shower of stones supposedly fell on the Alban mount about 20 kilometers (12 miles) from Rome. This was interpreted by the Romans as an inauspicious omen as supposedly a similar event about three hundred years earlier was a portent of a plague which indirectly led to the death of the third king of Rome, Tullus Hostilius. This omen brought great alarm to the Senate, who then appointed Valerius as dictator to establish days of worship and mandate offerings so that the Romans could beg for forgiveness from their gods. Valerius determined that these offerings should be conducted by neighboring allied people as well as Romans and set an order for the days each allied group would sacrifice. After these deliberations were made, the offerings went off without a hitch and he soon resigned his dictatorship.

In 332 BC, rumors of an invasion of Gauls spread, prompting the Senate to appoint Marcus Papirius Crassus as dictator, who himself appointed Valerius as his magister equitum. Due to the previously stated Roman fear of Gauls, Crassus and Poplicola conducted the levy far more stringently than they would for wars against less strongly feared enemies. However, word soon reached the Romans that the rumors of a Gallic invasion were unfounded, and as a result both Crassus and Poplicola resigned their positions.

After his term as magister equitum, Valerius is never mentioned again in our sources. Poplicola had no recorded children and he was the last of the Poplicolae branch of the Valerii family to be attested in our sources.

== Bibliography ==
- Broughton, T. Robert S., The Magistrates of the Roman Republic, American Philological Association (1952)
- Livy (Titus Livius), Ab Urbe Condita Libri

Political offices
Preceded by Gaius Sulpicius Peticus IV; Marcus Valerius Poplicola II	Roman consul 352 BC; With: Gaius Marcius Rutilus II	Succeeded by Gaius Sulpicius Peticus V Titus Quinctius Pennus Capitolinus Crispinus
