= Marcus Fabius Ambustus (consul 360 BC) =

Roman consul and general (fl. 360–351 BC)

Marcus Fabius Ambustus (fl. 360–351 BC) was a statesman and general of the Roman Republic. He was the son of Numerius Fabius Ambustus.

He served as consul three times: in 360, 356, and 354 BC. His consulships occurred during a time in which Rome was reasserting itself following its defeat at the hands of the Gauls in the Battle of the Allia of 387 BC. He defeated the Hernici in 356, and Tibur in 354, earning a triumph for the latter victory. He further succeeded against the Falisci, but was defeated by Tarquinia.

As he was absent from Rome when the time came for holding the comitia, the senate, which did not like to entrust them to his colleague, who had appointed a plebeian dictator, and still less to the dictator himself, nominated interreges for the purpose. The object of the patricians was to secure both places in the consulship for their own order again, which was effected by Ambustus, who seems to have returned to Rome in the meantime. He was appointed the eleventh interrex in 355, and declared two patricians consuls in violation of the Licinian law (the plebs had been made eligible for the consulship again, over his objections), although he was not successful in his object. He served as interrex again in 351, and as dictator in 351. There is some disagreement between scholars over whether he ever served as censor, possibly in 358, and as princeps senatus later in life (the two questions are connected, as all principes prior to 209 BC were censorii). He was possibly the interrex appointed in 340 BC named M. Fabius, other possibilities includes his son, Marcus Fabius Ambustus or another contemporary Fabii, Marcus Fabius Dursuo, consul in 345 BC.

He was alive in 325, when his son, Quintus Fabius Maximus Rullianus, was Master of the Horse to Lucius Papirius Cursor, and fled to Rome to implore protection from the vengeance of the dictator. He interceded on his son's behalf both with the senate and the people. He was also father of Marcus Fabius Ambustus, who also served as Master of the Horse.

== See also ==
- Fabius Ambustus

Political offices
Preceded by Gaius Licinius Stolo, and Gaius Sulpicius Peticus II	Consul of the Roman Republic; 360 BC with Gaius Poetelius Libo Visolus	Succeeded by Marcus Popillius Laenas, and Gnaeus Manlius Capitolinus Imperiosus
Preceded by Gaius Marcius Rutilus, and Gnaeus Manlius Capitolinus Imperiosus II	Consul of the Roman Republic; 356 BC with Marcus Popillius Laenas II	Succeeded by Gaius Sulpicius Peticus III, and Marcus Valerius Poplicola
Preceded by Gaius Sulpicius Peticus III, and Marcus Valerius Poplicola	Consul of the Roman Republic; 354 BC with Titus Quinctius Pennus Capitolinus Crispinus	Succeeded by Gaius Sulpicius Peticus IV, and Marcus Valerius Poplicola II
