= Lucius Cornelius Scipio (consul 350 BC) =

Lucius Cornelius Scipio was a 4th century BC politician of the Roman Republic. He served as consul in 350 BC.

== Family ==
Lucius Cornelius Scipio was the son of Publius Cornelius Maluginensis Scipio, consular tribune in 395 BC. He was the younger brother of Publius Cornelius Scipio, Magister equitum in 350 BC. Lucius Scipio's grandson was Lucius Cornelius Scipio Barbatus, and through him, he was the paternal ancestor of all the future Cornelii Scipiones including Scipio Africanus.

== Career ==
In 352 BC, he served as interrex and appointed the consuls, and Gaius Julius Iullus as dictator, in order to fight the Etruscans.

In 350 BC, Lucius Cornelius Scipio was elected consul with Marcus Popilius Laenas as his colleague. As consul he successfully defeated the Gauls and triumphed.

It has been suggested he served as censor in 340 BC.
