= Interrex =

Position in ancient Rome

The interrex (plural interreges) was an extraordinary magistrate during the Roman Kingdom and Republic. Initially, the interrex was appointed after the death of the king of Rome until the election of his successor, hence its name—a ruler "between kings" (Latin: inter reges). The position was retained during the Republic when both consuls were unable to assume their duties, especially holding elections. Interreges ruled for only five days, which often led several of them to be appointed in succession, the record being 15 interreges in 326 BC. They were exclusively chosen from among patrician senators, and during the Conflict of the Orders, their appointment was sometimes designed to hinder plebeians from reaching power or passing laws.

As with the dictatorship, interreges are mostly found until the time of the Second Punic War. The position was only resurrected by Sulla in 82 BC so he could become dictator, and between 55 and 52 BC, when Pompey disturbed the constitution for his own benefit.

== History ==
The office of interrex was supposedly created following the death of Rome's first king Romulus, and thus its origin is obscured by legend. The Senate of the Roman Kingdom was at first unable to choose a new king. For the purpose of continuing the government of the city, the Senate, which then consisted of one hundred members, was divided into ten decuriae (groups of ten); and from each of these decuriae one senator was nominated as decurio. Each of the ten decuriones in succession held the regal power and its badges for five days as interrex; and if no king had been appointed at the expiration of fifty days, the rotation began anew. The period during which they exercised their power was called an interregnum, and on that occasion lasted for one year. Thereafter Numa Pompilius was elected as the new king.

After the death of each subsequent king, an interrex was appointed by the Senate. His function was to call a meeting of the Comitia Curiata, which would elect a new king.

Under the Republic, interreges were appointed to hold the comitia for the election of the consuls when the consuls, through civil commotion or other cause such as death, had been unable to do so during their year of office. Each interrex held the office for only five days, as under the kings. During the brief interregnum, they cumulated most of the original power of the king, or the power of the two consuls in the first years of the Republic. The comitia were, as a general rule, not held by the first interrex, who was originally the curio maximus, but more usually by the second or third; in one instance we read of an eleventh, and in another of a fourteenth interrex. The comitia to elect the first consuls were held by Spurius Lucretius Tricipitinus either as interrex or as praefectus urbi. The interreges under the Republic, at least from 482 BC, were elected from ex-consuls by the Senate, and were not confined to the decem primi or ten chief senators as under the kings. Plebeians, however, were not admissible to this office; and consequently when the Senate included plebeians, the patrician senators met together without the plebeian members to elect an interrex. For this reason, as well as on account of the influence which the interrex exerted in the election of the magistrates, we find that the tribunes of the plebs were strongly opposed to the appointment of an interrex. The interrex had jurisdictio. It is possible that interreges were the only magistrates exempted from the veto power of a tribune - which would be exceptional, since even dictators were usually subject to the veto.

Interreges continued to be appointed occasionally until the time of the Second Punic War. After that no interrex was appointed until the Senate, by command of Sulla, named L. Valerius Flaccus to hold the comitia for his election as Dictator in 82 BC. In 55 BC, another interrex was appointed to hold the comitia in which Pompey and Crassus were elected consuls. Several interreges served during 53 and 52 BC, the last recorded being Marcus Aemilius Lepidus (triumvir); in 52 BC, an interrex presided over comitia that appointed Pompey as sole consul. The unsually high number of interreges during this two year period prompted Cicero to comment on the situation ironically in a letter.

== List of Roman interreges (509 - 52 BC) ==
Unless otherwise indicated, the names and dates of the interreges are taken from Thomas Broughton's The Magistrates of the Roman Republic.

Year	Interrex	note
509	Sp. Lucretius Tricipitinus	
482	A. Sempronius Atratinus, 1st Sp. Lartius Flavus, 2nd	
462	P. Valerius Poplicola	
444	T. Quinctius Capitolinus Barbatus	
420	L. Papirius Mugillanus	
413	Q. Fabius Vibulanus	
396	L. Valerius Potitus Q. Servilius Fidenas M. Furius Camillus	
391	M. Furius Camillus II P. Cornelius Scipio L. Valerius Potitus II	
389	P. Cornelius Scipio II M. Furius Camillus III	
387	M. Manlius Capitolinus Ser. Sulpicius Camerinus L. Valerius Potitus III	
355	Q. Servilius Ahala I & II M. Fabius Ambustus I & II Cn. Manlius Capitolinus Imperiosus C. Fabius Ambustus C. Sulpicius Peticus L. Aemilius Mamercinus	Servilius & M. Fabius appointed twice
352	11 unknown interreges L. Cornelius Scipio	Cornelius as the twelfth of a series of interreges
351	C. Sulpicius Peticus II M. Fabius Ambustus III	
340	M. Valerius Corvus M. Fabius Ambustus IV? or M. Fabius Dursuo	
332	4 unknown interreges M. Valerius Corvus II	Valerius as the fifth and last of a series of interreges
326	13 unknown interreges L. Aemilius Mamercinus Privernas	Aemilius as the fourteenth of a series of interreges
320	Q. Fabius Maximus Rullianus M. Valerius Corvus III	
298	Ap. Claudius Caecus P. Sulpicius Saverrius	
291	L. Postumius Megellus	
222	Q. Fabius Maximus Verrucosus?	Fabius was twice Interrex, both at unknown dates. This is one possible date as suggested by Broughton.
216	C. Claudius Centho P. Cornelius Scipio Asina	Scipio held the comitia that elected the consul Varro
208?	Q. Fabius Maximus Verrucosus II?	Mommsen and Broughton suggests this as a possible date for Fabius as interrex. Livy instead attributes the elections to the Dictator, T. Manlius Torquatus
82	L. Valerius Flaccus	
55	Marcus Valerius Messalla Niger	
53	numerous unknown interreges Marcus Valerius Messalla Niger Quintus Caecilius Metellus Pius Scipio	
52	Marcus Valerius Messalla Niger Marcus Aemilius Lepidus (triumvir)	

== Sources ==
Drummond, Andrew (2015). "Interrex". Oxford Classical Dictionary. Oxford Research Encyclopedias. doi:10.1093/acrefore/9780199381135.013.3305. ISBN 9780199381135.
