= Gaius Sulpicius Peticus =

4th-century BC Roman politician and general

Gaius Sulpicius Peticus was a prominent 4th-century BC Roman politician and general who served as consul five times and as dictator once. Sulpicius was a member of the gens Sulpicia, a prominent patrician family which had attained the consular dignity a great number of times following the foundation of the republic. However, the familial relationship between Sulpicius and other known contemporary members of the gens is unknown, with the only information about his heritage being that his father was named Marcus and his grandfather was named Quintus.

== Possible term as tribune and censorship ==
In 380 BC, Sulpicius made his first appearance in historical records serving in the position of consular tribune, serving alongside Lucius Valerius Poplicola, Publius Valerius Potitus Poplicola, Servius Cornelius Maluginensis, Licinus Menenius Lanatus, Lucius Aemilius Mamercinus, Gnaeus Sergius Fidenas Coxo, Tiberius Papirius Crassus, and Lucius Papirius Mugillanus. This term as consular tribune is not certain however, as while he is mentioned as holding the position by the Fasti Capitolini and Diodorus Siculus, the historian Livy only records six men in that year's college, with Sulpicius being left out.

In 366 BC, Sulpicius was appointed censor, serving alongside Postumius Regillensis Albinus. Nothing is known of his term as censor other than that his colleague Postumius may died midway through the lustrum due to a pestilence, forcing Sulpicius to resign in accordance to Roman religious tradition.

== First two consulships and dictatorship ==
In 364 BC, Sulpicius was elected consul for the first time with either Gaius Licinius Calvus or Gaius Licinius Stolo as his colleague. In this year the pestilence which killed Sulpicius' previous colleague Postumius raged on, and in response the consuls prepared a ritual feast to the gods in order to appease them. However, when this rite failed to achieve its intended result, the consuls tried a more unorthodox tactic, and invited Etruscan musicians and dancers to put on theatrical performances. These performances became popular with the Roman youth who began to emulate them, starting the Roman theatrical tradition.

In 362 BC, Sulpicius served as a legate of the consul Lucius Genucius Aventinensis during his campaigns against the Hernicians, and when the consul Genucius was killed in a Hernician ambush, Sulpicius took control of the remnants of the army. Soon afterwards the Hernicians attacked the Roman camp, but despite being at a heavy disadvantage, Sulpicius inspired his troops who, as a result, repelled the Hernician force with great success. Shortly afterwards, Appius Claudius Crassus, the dictator appointed by the senate in response to Genucius' death, arrived with a new army and commended the bravery of Sulpicius and his men.

The next year, in 361 BC, Sulpicius was elected consul for a second time, with his consular partner being the Licinius who was not his colleague in his previous consulship. In this consular year, the war with the Hernicians continued, which resulted in the two consuls leading an army to fight them. However, the consuls were unable to catch the Hernician army in the field. So instead they laid siege to and assaulted the Hernician town of Ferentinum. As the consuls were returning to Rome after their victory, the men of Tibur refused to give them aid, inflaming tensions between Rome and Tibur, which would lead to war in the following years. When Sulpicius got back to Rome, he celebrated a triumph over the victory against the Hernicians, despite it being a joint victory by the consuls, likely either because the senate was unwilling to grant a triumph to a plebeian, or because Sulpicius played a leading role in the victory.

In 358 BC, rumours spread of a Gallic invasion, and since both consuls were occupied with other campaigns, Sulpicius was appointed dictator by the senate to combat this threat. After choosing Marcus Valerius Poplicola as his magister equitum, Sulpicius took some experienced troops from both consular armies and set off to fight the Gauls. At first Sulpicius was reluctant to engage the Gallic force, preferring to wait them out, but this strategy grew to be extremely unpopular with the soldiers, who were longing for combat. The soldiers in response nominated a centurion named Sextus Tullius to convince Sulpicius to listen to the soldiers entreaties, which, after a long speech on the part of Tullius, he eventually came around to do so. Tullius then warned Sulpicius that the men were restless and were willing to take any pretense to go to battle, a sentiment that was confirmed by the outbreak of a large skirmish between the Romans and Gauls that was only stopped due to the intervention of the centurions, which further convinced Sulpicius that starting a battle on his own terms was imperative. As a result, Sulpicius resolved to take the enemy by surprise, and concocted a scheme in which to do so, involving sending muleteers and cavalrymen on a nearby mountain to lie in wait until he gave them a signal to charge. In the morning, Sulpicius then lined his troops on the foot of the mountain, so that the Gauls were required to fight facing the mount, thus setting the stage for a flanking attack. The Gauls started by attacking the Roman right, resulting in the Romans in that flank beginning to waver, which caused Sulpicius to ridicule the soldiers for their eagerness to go to battle but their cowardice when confronted with combat. This statement gave such shame to the soldiers that they regained their cohesion and viciously charged the Gauls, which combined with a cavalry charge, put the Gauls on that flank to flight. Sulpicius then turned his attention to the left flank, where the Gauls were attacking in a large mass, and gave the necessary signal to the cavalrymen and muleteers who were lying in wait, causing them to charge into the Gallic flank. The Gauls were terrified by this charge and attempted to flee to their camp, but the majority were intercepted by the cavalrymen led by the Magister equitum Marcus Valerius, which slayed a great number of fleeing Gauls. Thus Sulpicius won a great victory, and celebrated a second triumph upon returning to Rome. During his triumph he dedicated a large quantity of treasure, and then stored it underneath the capitol.

== Final three consulships ==
In 356 BC, a plebeian dictator was appointed to fight off Etruscan invaders, a motion which was heavily unpopular with the still mostly patrician senate, who thus refused to let the dictator preside over the elections for the next year. The senate thus turned to patrician intereges to conduct the elections in 355 BC, eight of which were appointed, with two men appointed twice, before the new consuls were declared. Sulpicius was among these interreges, being the fifth one in that year, and was one of the consuls elected, being elected with Marcus Valerius Poplicola, his Magister equitum in 358 BC. Since the election had been delayed, Sulpicius and Valerius took office on the day they were declared consuls. In his consular year, Sulpicius campaigned against Tarquinii and ravaged their fields, while his colleague Valerius led his army against Tibur. Some ancient historians stated that both consuls conducted the campaign against Tibur however. More pressingly however, class tensions were inflamed this year, with the plebeians feeling disenfranchised as a result of the patrician order having elected two of their own in violation of the Lex Licinia Sextia. Believing that they were oppressed by the patricians, the plebeians resolved to abandon the Campus Martius and perhaps even the city itself, leaving only the patricians to vote in the next consular election, resulting in patrician consuls being elected again for the next year.

In 353 BC, Sulpicius and Valerius were elected as consuls again, much to the chagrin of the plebeians, who were too preoccupied with their debts to focus on political concerns. In this year there were two wars, one with the Etruscans of Tarquinii continued from previous years, and another new one with the Volscians. The consuls drew lots to determine which campaign should be assigned to each of them, with Sulpicius being chosen to fight Tarquinii and his colleague, the Volscians. Thus Sulpicius marched to Tarquinii and ravaged their territory, but also found that not only had the Roman salt works been raided, but the loot had been sent in the direction of Caere, another Etruscan city. This convinced Sulpicius that the Caerites were aiding the men of Tarquinii against Rome, prompting him to tell the senate to order a dictator nominated. The senate recalled the other consul Valerius for this purpose, who nominated Titus Manlius Imperiosus Torquatus as dictator.

In 351 BC, Sulpicius was created interrex for a second time, again with the task of electing two patrician consuls. Sulpicius failed to have any consuls elected, however his successor achieved success in this, having two patrician consuls elected. One of these consuls was Sulpicius himself, who was elected alongside Titus Quinctius Poenus Capitolinus Crispinus. Almost as soon as they were elected, the consuls proceeded to war, with Sulpicius taking on Tarquinii once again, and Quinctius combatting the Falerii. During his campaign, Sulpicius yet again laid waste to the fields of the Etruscans, which caused them to agree to a 40 year long truce, ending the war. Quinctius achieved the same with the Falerii, putting Rome at peace. However, as was routine, when there was harmony abroad there was disharmony at home, and this year was no exception, with strife among the orders starting once again. This was caused by Gaius Marcius Rutilus, who was the first plebeian dictator, announcing that he would stand for office for censor. The consuls, being patricians and not wanting a plebeian to occupy yet more of their exclusive offices, declared that they would accept no votes cast for Marcius, but Marcius continued with great vigor, and when time came for elections Marcius won handily, much to the chagrin of the patricians.

Thus ends the 29 year long career of Gaius Sulpicius Peticus, one of the most distinguished politicians and generals of the era. Sulpicius had no recorded children nor any recorded descendants. Sulpicius' date of death is unknown, but it is possible that he died not long after his final consulship, as he was almost certainly an old man by that time and he is never again mentioned by our sources.

== See also ==
- Sulpicia (gens)

Political offices
Preceded by Lucius Genucius Aventinensis and Quintus Servilius Ahala	Consul of the Roman Republic with Gaius Licinius Calvus; 364 BC	Succeeded by Gnaeus Genucius Aventinensis II and Lucius Aemilius Mamercinus II
Preceded by Quintus Servilius Ahala II and Lucius Genucius Aventinensis II	Consul of the Roman Republic with Gaius Licinius Stolo; 361 BC	Succeeded by Marcus Fabius Ambustus and Gaius Poetelius Libo Visolus
Preceded by Marcus Fabius Ambustus II and Marcus Popillius Laenas II	Consul of the Roman Republic with Marcus Valerius Poplicola; 355 BC	Succeeded by Marcus Fabius Ambustus III and Titus Quinctius Pennus Capitolinus Crispinus
Preceded by Marcus Fabius Ambustus III and Titus Quinctius Pennus Capitolinus Crispinus	Consul of the Roman Republic with Marcus Valerius Poplicola II; 353 BC	Succeeded by Publius Valerius Poplicola and Gaius Marcius Rutilus II
Preceded by Publius Valerius Poplicola and Gaius Marcius Rutilus II	Consul of the Roman Republic with Titus Quinctius Pennus Capitolinus Crispinus II; 351 BC	Succeeded by Marcus Popillius Laenas III and Lucius Cornelius Scipio
