= Gaius Marcius Rutilus =

4th-century BC Roman plebeian dictator and consul

Gaius Marcius Rutilus (also seen as "Rutulus") was the first plebeian dictator and censor of ancient Rome, and was consul four times.

He was first elected consul in 357 BC, then appointed as dictator the following year in order to deal with an invasion by the Etruscans which had reached as far as the ancient salt-works on the coast. He surprised the enemy's camp, captured 8,000 of the enemy and drove the rest out of Roman territory, for which he was granted a triumph by the people, against the Senate's wishes.

Rutilus was again elected consul in 352 BC. At the end of his term, he ran for censor and won, despite patrician opposition. He was also consul in 344 BC and 342 BC, when he led the army in the Samnite Wars.

His namesake son was tribune of the plebs in 311 BC and consul in 310 BC. According to Fergus Millar, this son was one of the first plebeian augurs under the lex Ogulnia and also held the position of censor twice, the first time in 294 BC and the second time in 265 BC.

== Sources ==
- Livy. History of Rome, Book VII

Political offices
Preceded by Gaius Fabius Ambustus and Gaius Plautius Proculus	Consul of the Roman Republic with Gnaeus Manlius Capitolinus Imperiosus; 357 BC	Succeeded by Marcus Fabius Ambustus and Marcus Popillius Laenas
Preceded by Gaius Sulpicius Peticus and Marcus Valerius Poplicola	Consul of the Roman Republic with Publius Valerius Poplicola; 352 BC	Succeeded by Gaius Sulpicius Peticus and Titus Quinctius Poenus Capitolinus Crispinus
Preceded by Marcus Fabius Dorsuo and Servius Sulpicius Camerinus Rufus	Consul of the Roman Republic with Titus Manlius Imperiosus Torquatus; 344 BC	Succeeded by Marcus Valerius Corvus and Aulus Cornelius Cossus Arvina
Preceded by Marcus Valerius Corvus and Aulus Cornelius Cossus Arvina	Consul of the Roman Republic with Quintus Servilius Ahala; 342 BC	Succeeded by Gaius Plautius Venox and Lucius Aemilius Mamercinus Privernas
