= Marcus Valerius Poplicola =

4th-century BC Roman politician and consul

Marcus Valerius Poplicola was a politician of the Roman Republic who served as magister equitum under the dictator Gaius Sulpicius Peticus in 358 and as consul in 355 and 353 BC.

He was chosen as the magister equitum of Gaius Sulpicius Peticus in 358 BC in order to confront a group of Gauls who had entered Latium. The Romans engaged the Gauls at Pedum after a prolonged standoff. Poplicola was then elected as consul in 355 BC alongside the former dictator Peticus. The two took the town of Empulum from Tibur without any major battle being fought. His next consulship was in 353 BC, and he served alongside Peticus once again. With the threat of attack from both the Etruscans and the Volsci, Valerius was called back to Rome in order to nominate Titus Manlius Imperiosus Torquatus as dictator.

Political offices
| Preceded by Marcus Fabius Ambustus II and Marcus Popillius Laenas II | Consul of the Roman Republic with Gaius Sulpicius Peticus III; 355 BC | Succeeded by Marcus Fabius Ambustus III and Titus Quinctius Pennus Capitolinus Crispinus |
| Preceded by Marcus Fabius Ambustus III and Titus Quinctius Pennus Capitolinus Crispinus | Consul of the Roman Republic with Gaius Sulpicius Peticus IV; 353 BC | Succeeded by Publius Valerius Poplicola and Gaius Marcius Rutilus II |
