= Carl Nordenfalk =

Swedish art historian (1907–1992)

Carl Nordenfalk (13 December 1907 – 13 June 1992) was a Swedish art historian, academic and director of the Swedish Nationalmuseum from 1958 to 1968.

He is best known for his work on Late Antique illuminations, especially those linked to the Gospel Canon Tables. In addition, he contributed to the study of modern painters, including Vincent van Gogh and Rembrandt. He was elected to the American Philosophical Society in 1970 and the American Academy of Arts and Sciences in 1974.

== Partial List of Publications ==
- Die spätantiken Kanontafeln: kunstgeschichtliche Studien über die eusebianische Evangelien-konkordanz in den vier ersten Jahrhunderten ihrer Geschichte (1938) Carl Nordenfalk. O. Isacsons boktryckeri a.-b., Göteborg, 320 pp.
- Early Medieval Painting, from the Fourth to the Eleventh Century (1957) André Grabar and Carl Nordenfalk. Editions D'Art Albert Skira, Geneva - New York, 243 pp.
- Romanesque Painting, from the Eleventh to the Thirteenth Century (1958) André Grabar and Carl Nordenfalk. Editions D'Art Albert Skira, Geneva - New York, 231 pp.
