= Fasti Potentini =

Fragmentary list of Roman consuls from AD 86 to 118

The Fasti Potentini are a fragmentary list of Roman consuls from AD 86 to 118, originally erected at Potentia in Lucania, a region of southern Italy. Together with similar inscriptions, such as the Fasti Capitolini and Fasti Triumphales, as well as the names of magistrates mentioned by ancient writers, the Potentini form part of a chronology referred to as the Fasti Consulares, or Consular Fasti, sometimes abbreviated to just "the fasti".

== Background ==
Roman calendars originally contained lists of the days fasti, days on which public business could be transacted, and days nefasti, when business was prohibited for religious reasons. Over time, the word fasti came to refer to the calendars themselves, which frequently contained lists of the annual magistrates. In Roman culture, as in many other ancient civilizations, historical events were usually dated by the names of the presiding magistrates, in this case the annually elected consuls. As a result, calendars listing the consuls over a span of years also came to be referred to as fasti.

Under the Republic, if a consul died or resigned during his year of office, a new consul was elected to replace him, and designated consul suffectus, to distinguish him from the consules ordinarii who lent their names to the year, although in all other respects his authority was equal to that of his colleague. In imperial times, it was common for the emperors to divide the year into periods of six, four, or two months, sometimes referred to as nundinia, and appoint a different pair of consuls for each nundinium; although sometimes one consul continued in office, while a new colleague was appointed. The emperor himself frequently served as consul ordinarius, resigning in favour of a new consul on the Ides of January or the Kalends of February, while his colleague remained in office.

== Contents ==
The Fasti Potentini consists of two sections, the first covering AD 86 to 93, and the second 112 to 116. The consuls are given in two columns, in keeping with the principle that there should always be two consuls. The right-hand column is more heavily damaged, so that all of the consuls on this side beginning with AD 93 are inferred from other sources. The list is partial, omitting some of the suffecti from extant years, and frequently giving consuls who may not have been colleagues on the same line. In the first section, the ordinarii are always given in the ablative case, i.e. T. Aurelio Fulvo M. Asinio Atratino cos., but in the second part all of the consuls are given in the nominative. In the transcription below, all of the names are given in the nominative.

The following transcription is based on one originally published in L'Année épigraphique in 1949, as amended in 2003, 2005, and 2020, together with the emendations of Eck, Paci, and Serenelli published in Picus in 2003. This table uses modern conventions for distinguishing between I and J, and between U and V. Otherwise, the names and notes are given as spelled in the fasti, including spelling variations, substituted letters, omitted and duplicated letters. Interpolated text for missing fragments of the original is given in square brackets, [ ].

=== Abbreviations ===
- Coss. = consules, consuls
- Suf. = consules suffecti
- Imp. = imperator, emperor

=== Praenomina ===
The following praenomina appear in the Fasti Potentini. All were regularly abbreviated.

- A. = Aulus
- C. = Gaius
- Cn. = Gnaeus
- D. = Decimus
- L. = Lucius
- M. = Marcus
- M'. = Manius
- P. = Publius
- Q. = Quintus
- Ser. = Servius
- Sex. = Sextus
- T. = Titus
- Ti. = Tiberius

=== Transcription ===
Year AD	Year AUC	Magistracy	Left column	Right column
86	840	Suf.	Q. Vibius Secund. Marrius Celsus; C. Jaevlenus Priscus	Octavius Fronio; A. Lappius Maximus
87	841	Coss. Suf.	Imp. Domit. Caes. Aug. XIII; Calpurnius Piso Licinian. C. Ducenius Proculus; L. Neratius Priscus	L. Volusius Saturn. C. Bellicius Natal. C. Cilnius Proculus
88	842	Coss. Suf.	Imp. Domit. Caes. XIIII; D. Plotius Grypus; M'. Otacilius Catulus	L. Menicius Rufus; Q. Ninnius Hasta
89	843	Coss. Suf.	T. Aurelius Fulvus; M. Peducaeus Saenianus; A. Vicirus Proculus	M. Asinius Atratinus; P. Sallustius Blaes. M'. Laberius Maximus
90	844	Coss. Suf.	Imp. Domit. Aug. Ger. XV; L. Cornelius Pusio; Ser. Julius Servianus; C. Caristanius Fronto; C. Aquilius Proculus; L. Pullaienus Pollio; Cn. Pompeius Catullinus	M. Cocceius Nerva; L. Antistius Rusticus; Q. Accaeus Rufus; P. Baebius Italicus; Cn. Pompeius Longin. M. Tullius Cerialis
91	845	Coss. Suf.	M'. Acilius Glabrio; D. Minicius Faustinus; Q. Valerius Vegetus	M. Ulpius Trajanus; P. Valerius M[a]rin. P. Metilius Nepos
92	846	Coss. Suf.	Imp. Domitianus XVI; L. Vinullius Apronianus; L. Stertinius Avitus; Q. Arulenus Rusticus	Q. Volusius Satu[rn.] Ti. J[ulius Polemaeanus] C. Ju[lius Silanus]
93	847	Coss. Suf.	Sex. Pompeius Colle[ga] [T.] Avidius Q[uietus] [L. Dasumius Hadrianus]	[M. Peducaeus Priscinus] [Sex. Lusianus Proculus] [C.] Corn[elius Naso?]
			Years 94–111 missing	
112	866	Coss. Suf.	[Imp. Trajanus Aug. VI] [Licinius Ruso] [Cn. Cornelius Severus] P. [Stertinius Quartus] C. [Claudius Severus]	[T. Sextius Africanus] [Q. Valerius Vegetus] [T. Julius Maximus] [T. Settidius Firmus]
113	867	Coss. Suf.	L. Publili[us Celsus II] Ser. Corn[elius Dolabella] L. Stertinius [Noricus] Cn. Cornelius U[rbicus]	[C. Clodius Crispinus] [L. Fadius Rufinus] [T. Sempronius Rufus]
114	868	Coss. Suf.	P. Manilius Vop[iscus] C. Clodius Nummu[s] L. Lollianus Av[itus]	[Q. Ninnius Hasta] [L. Caesennius Sospes] [L. Messius Rusticus]
115	869	Coss. Suf.	M. Vergilianus [Pedo] L. Julius [Frugi] M. Pomp[eius Macrinus]	[L. Vipstanus Messala] [P. Juventius Celsus] [T. Vibius Varus]
116	870	Coss. Suf.	L. Fund[anius Aelianus] Ti. [Julius Secundus]	[Sex. Carminius Vetus]

== See also ==
- List of Roman consuls
- List of ancient Roman fasti
- Roman calendar

== Bibliography ==
- A Dictionary of Greek and Roman Antiquities, William Smith, ed., Little, Brown, and Company, Boston (1859).
- René Cagnat et alii, L'Année épigraphique (The Year in Epigraphy, abbreviated AE), Presses Universitaires de France (1888–present).
- Harper's Dictionary of Classical Literature and Antiquities, Harry Thurston Peck, ed. (Second Edition, 1897).
- Oxford Classical Dictionary, N. G. L. Hammond and H. H. Scullard, eds., Clarendon Press, Oxford (Second Edition, 1970).
- Werner Eck, Gianfranco Paci, and E. Percossi Serenelli, "Per una nuova edizione dei Fasti Potentini", in Picus, vol. 23, pp. 51–108 (2003).
