= Marcus Popillius Laenas (consul 359 BC) =

4th-century BC Roman statesman and general

Marcus Popillius Laenas was a four-time consul of the Roman Republic. In the year (according to Varro) 359 BC, he defeated a Gallic army.

Near the end of his consulship with Gnaeus Manlius Capitolinus Imperiosus, the Tarquinians invaded the Roman territories on the Etruscan border, if this Gallic war took place 30 years after the occupation of Rome by the Gauls (in 386/5 BC). Dio Cassius apparently identifies this war with the one in Camillus's fifth dictatorship when the election of the consuls was resumed. Those events took place in 364 BC, about a decade earlier, according to Livy.

He is named by Cicero as flamen Carmentalis, the flamen of Carmenta, in 359 BC.

Political offices
Preceded by Marcus Fabius Ambustus; Gaius Poetelius Libo Visolus	Roman consul 359 BC with Gnaeus Manlius Capitolinus Imperiosus	Succeeded by Gaius Fabius Ambustus; Gaius Plautius Proculus
Preceded by Gaius Marcius Rutilus; Gnaeus Manlius Capitolinus Imperiosus	Roman consul II; 356 BC with Marcus Fabius Ambustus	Succeeded by Gaius Sulpicius Peticus; Marcus Valerius Poplicola
Preceded by Gaius Sulpicius Peticus; Titus Quinctius Poenus	Roman consul III; 350 BC with Lucius Cornelius Scipio	Succeeded by Lucius Furius Camillus; Appius Claudius Crassus Inregillensis
Preceded by Lucius Furius Camillus; Appius Claudius Crassus Inregillensis	Roman consul IV; 348 BC with Marcus Valerius Corvus	Succeeded by Gaius Plautius Venox; Titus Manlius Imperiosus Torquatus
