= Titus Quinctius Pennus Capitolinus Crispinus =

Roman dictator in 361 BC

Titus Quinctius Pennus Capitolinus Crispinus was a politician of the Roman Republic. In 361 BC he was a dictator of Rome and obtained a triumph following a successful battle against the Gauls. In 360 BC he was magister equitum, and he continued campaigning against the Gauls, who had allied themselves with the Tiburtes. In 354 and 351 BC he was consul. During the latter of these consulships, he set out for war with the Falisci, but, upon meeting no resistance, burned and pillaged their land instead.

After his consulships, he may have gone into retirement to a villa near Tusculum, and henceforth may have been the Titus Quinctius who was recorded to have been coerced in 342 BC by a group of mutinying Roman soldiers to lead their rebellion. The identity of this Titus Quinctius however remains unclear, and may have instead been a similarly named contemporary.
