= Magister equitum =

Roman magistrate

The magister equitum, in English master of the horse or master of the cavalry, was a Roman magistrate appointed as lieutenant to a dictator. His nominal function was to serve as commander of the Roman cavalry in time of war, but just as a dictator could be nominated to respond to other crises, so the magister equitum could operate independently of the cavalry; like the dictator, the appointment of a magister equitum served both military and political purposes.

== Origin ==
In the time of the Roman Kingdom, the king himself would lead the cavalry into battle, or else delegate this authority to his chief advisor, the Tribune of the Celeres, the cavalry unit that also served as the king's personal bodyguard. The last person to hold this position was Lucius Junius Brutus, nephew of Lucius Tarquinius Superbus, the seventh and final King of Rome. After the rape of Lucretia, it was Brutus who, in his capacity as Tribune of the Celeres, convened the comitia, and brought about the abrogation of the king's imperium. Following the expulsion of Tarquin, Brutus, whom the comitia elected one of the first consuls, (Note: Although it is traditional to refer to Brutus and all of his successors as consuls, their formal title was probably praetor until the institution of a third, subordinate praetorship in 366 BC.) commanded the cavalry in the Battle of Silva Arsia, where he fell, BC 509.

In the early years of the Republic, no attempt was made to reconstitute the office of Tribune of the Celeres; the supreme military authority was vested in the consuls. In keeping with the principle that no one man should hold the full power of the Roman state, it was possible to appeal the decisions of one consul to the other. However, in the ninth year of the Republic, war appeared imminent with both the Latin League, led by the exiled king's son-in-law, Octavius Mamilius, and the Sabines, with whom the Romans had fought in 505 and 503 BC. At the same time, there was suspicion that the consuls harbored royalist sympathies. In the face of this panic, the Romans resolved to appoint a praetor maximus, or dictator, as the office came to be called, from whom there should be no right of appeal, for the duration of the emergency.

The consul Titus Lartius Flavus was nominated the first dictator, and Spurius Cassius Vecellinus the first magister equitum. (Note: Livy reports an alternate tradition, according to which Manius Valerius Maximus was the first dictator; he calls Manius the son of Marcus and grandson of Volesus Valerius, although Livy was probably referring to the brother of Marcus, who in fact was appointed dictator in 494 BC. Livy rejects the tradition that Manius was the first dictator in 501, in part because the law establishing the position specified that it should be filled only by men of consular rank (although this does not seem to have been an impediment to his nomination in 494), and in part because Marcus Valerius, who had defeated the Sabines in his consulship, four years earlier, and been awarded a triumph, would have been preferred over the as-yet undistinguished Manius.) Alarmed by this development, the Sabines sent envoys to Rome to negotiate peace. The Latins were not yet ready for war, and thus the dictator and magister equitum were able to lay down their office without taking the field.

== Nature of the office ==
The powers of the ancient Tribune of the Celeres were thus divided and limited from the institution of the dictatorship. Although the dictator commanded the entire army, his technical title was magister populi, or "master of the infantry", while the cavalry was entrusted to his lieutenant. Unlike the relationship between consuls, who shared equal authority, the magister equitum was always subordinate to the dictator. Although history does not record whether the first magister equitum was nominated by the dictator, in subsequent practice a magister equitum was nearly always chosen by the dictator under whom he served. The dictator retained the power to dismiss the magister equitum, and to appoint a replacement. Once the emergency for which the dictator was nominated had passed, or the expiration of six months, the dictator was compelled to lay down his office, and when he did so, the imperium of the magister equitum likewise expired.

Although the original function of the dictator was to lead the Roman army in time of war, a dictator was sometimes nominated for the purpose of holding elections, restoring order, or performing vital religious functions when it was impossible for the consuls or other magistrates to do so. In these cases, it was still customary for the dictator to appoint a magister equitum to serve as his lieutenant. Even when the Roman army was in the field, the dictator might choose to divide his command, taking the field while relying on the magister equitum as his deputy in Rome, or sending the magister equitum into the field, allowing the dictator to remain at Rome. (Note: This did not mean that the Roman cavalry went wherever the magister equitum was stationed; if the magister equitum did not take the field, the cavalry would be with the dictator; if the dictator remained behind, then the magister equitum would have commanded the infantry as well as the cavalry.)

Like other magistrates, the magister equitum was entitled to wear the toga praetexta, sit in the sella curulis, and he was escorted by six lictors, a ceremonial bodyguard awarded to magistrates with imperium, and certain other persons. This was half the number of lictors to which the consuls were entitled, and the same number accorded to the praetors after the institution of that magistracy in 366 BC. As with other magistrates, the lictors of the magister equitum were expected to remove the axes from their fasces when entering the Pomerium, an area of the city of Rome that was considered sacred. Only the lictors of the dictator, who was entitled to an escort of twenty-four lictors, representing the full authority of the Roman state, retained their axes within the Pomerium, symbolizing that the dictator retained the power of life and death, even within Rome's sacred precinct.

== History ==
Before the institution of the praetorship, it was common for the magister equitum to be someone who had already served as consul or consular tribune. In this way, the magistracy was held by someone who had prior experience with military command. For those who had yet to achieve the highest offices of the Roman state, this appointment was a valuable stepping stone toward those offices. In the later republic, it was common for the magister equitum to be chosen from men of praetorian rank; that is, from those who had held the praetorship, but who had not yet been elected consul.

Through the course of the fourth century BC, which saw the institution of the praetorship and the admission of the plebeians to the higher offices of state, the need to resort to extraordinary magistrates such as the dictator and magister equitum for military emergencies declined, and they were increasingly employed for ceremonial purposes. By 300, even the power of the dictator was subject to provocatio, the right of appeal by a Roman citizen. Few of the dictators appointed during the third century were sent into the field, and thus the office of magister equitum was increasingly redundant. The last dictator to take the field was Marcus Junius Pera in 216 BC, during the Second Punic War, with Tiberius Sempronius Gracchus as his master of the horse.

During the remainder of the war, dictators were regularly appointed to hold the elections for annual magistrates. Although each nominated a magister equitum, none of them held an independent command, or led the army in the field. No dictator was appointed in the traditional manner after 202 BC, and with it the office of magister equitum fell dormant.

In 82 BC, the victorious general Sulla entered Rome after defeating the Marian forces, and at his urging the interrex, Lucius Valerius Flaccus convinced the comitia to appoint Sulla dictator for the purpose of restoring order. Sulla had thus revived the office of dictator, and with it the position of magister equitum. In gratitude, Sulla appointed Flaccus master of the horse, although he seems to have conducted no military activity. Sulla and Flaccus continued in office until laying down their authority in 79.

On the outbreak of civil war between Caesar and Pompeius in 49 BC, Caesar was appointed dictator for purposes of holding the elections; no magister equitum was nominated. Dictator for the second time in 47, Caesar made Marcus Antonius his master of the horse, followed by Marcus Aemilius Lepidus, whom Caesar reappointed in February 44. Caesar designated Gnaeus Domitius Calvinus to be the next magister equitum and possibly Caesar's nephew Gaius Octavius to follow him in 42, but in March 44 the dictator was assassinated before either designate could take office.

With the consolidation of power first under the triumvirate of Octavian, Antonius, and Lepidus, and then in the person of Octavian alone, no further dictators were appointed. Following Caesar's death, Antonius promulgated a law abolishing the office. Octavian was careful to clothe his assumption of power in a constitutional form, and although his power as Augustus in many ways exceeded that of a Roman dictator, he never assumed that title or the symbols of the office. His successors followed his example; even when they assumed the powers of a dictator, they never assumed the title or appointed a master of the horse. Thus, the ancient title of magister equitum fell once more into abeyance.

In the fourth century AD, the emperor Constantine revived the title as one of his senior military ranks in an effort to reduce the power of the praetorian prefects, creating the military office of the magister peditum, "master of the foot" or "master of the infantry". These positions were eventually amalgamated under the title of magister militum, or "master of the soldiers." Both roles continued to be used as military administrators of Byzantine praetorian prefectures.

== See also ==
- Aspbed
- Master of the Horse

== Bibliography ==
- Titus Livius (Livy), History of Rome.
- Dictionary of Greek and Roman Biography and Mythology, William Smith, ed., Little, Brown and Company, Boston (1849).
- Dictionary of Greek and Roman Antiquities, William Smith, ed., Little, Brown, and Company, Boston (1859).
- Harper's Dictionary of Classical Literature and Antiquities, Harry Thurston Peck, ed. (Second Edition, 1897).
- Oxford Classical Dictionary, N. G. L. Hammond and H. H. Scullard, eds., Clarendon Press, Oxford (Second Edition, 1970).
- Michael Grant, The Roman Emperors, Scribner’s (1985).
- Bradley Jordan, The Magister Equitum in the Roman Republic: The Evolution of an Extraordinary Magistracy, De Gruyter, Berlin, Boston (2024), ISBN 9783111338583.
