= Timeline of the Samnite Wars =

The military campaigns of the Samnite Wars were an important stage in Roman expansion in the Italian Peninsula.

== Background ==
The Samnites were a group of hill-tribes occupying the central Apennines. In the mid-4th century B.C. they began to expand into the territories of their neighbours, especially in Campania and the Liris valley. In the 4th century (B.C.), the cities of northern Campania had rallied around the leadership of the largest city, Capua. These Campani fought against the Samnites to the east. During the 4th-century, the Samnites grew to become the strongest group in the central highlands. At first, they had enemies in common with Rome in the Celts and Volsci, and this commonality of purpose led to the formation of a peace treaty with Rome in 354. Once these threats were removed, Samnium expansion brought them into conflict with Rome's growing influence in central Italy. Samnites were the only ones who possessed nearly equivalent power in Italy as to that of Romans; so that the Roman-Samnite wars determined which would be the leading power in Italy.

== First Samnite War (343-341 BC) ==
In the late 340s and early 330s, Roman armies fought Latins, Volsci, Campanians, and possibly Samnites, while Campanians and Samnites also conducted wars of their own. These conflicts were marked with shifting alliances that would greatly confuse later Roman writers. At some point, Capua and its allies appealed to Rome for help against the Samnites, who were pressing against communities in the lower Volturnus River Valley, one of the chief routes from the Samnite highlands to the coastal plains of Southern Latium and Campania. The results is what would later be called the First Samnites War, although it is unclear how much fighting between the Romans and Samnites actually occurred.

Event	Details	Ancient sources
343 BC - Battle of Mount Gaurus	The Roman consul M. Valerius Corvus routed the Samnites near Mount Gaurus in Campania	Livy 7.32-33, 37-38; Dionys. Hal. 15.3; Appian, Samn. 1; Auct. Vir. Ill. 26
343 BC - Battle of Mount Gaurus	Historical literature: E.T. Salmon (1967). Samnium and the Samnites. Cambridge U.P. pp. 196, 198–201.	
343 BC - Battle of Saticula	The Roman consul A. Cornelius Cossus Arvina was ambushed by the Samnites near the Samnite stronghold of Saticula, but was extricated from a dangerous situation by P. Decius Mus	Livy 7.33, 34-37, 38; Frontinus, Strategemata 1.5.14; 4.5.9; Auct. Vir. Ill. 26
343 BC - Battle of Saticula	Historical literature: E.T. Salmon (1967). Samnium and the Samnites. Cambridge U.P. p. 196.	
343 BC - Battle of Suessula	The Roman consul M. Valerius Corvus defeated the Samnites near Suessula	Livy 7.32-33, 37-38; Dionys. Hal. 15.3; Appian, Samn. 1; Auct. Vir. Ill. 26
343 BC - Battle of Suessula	Historical literature: E.T. Salmon (1967). Samnium and the Samnites. Cambridge U.P. p. 196.	
342 BC	The Romans were occupied with other matters, and there are no reports of fighting in this year	Livy 7.38-39; Dion. Hal. 15.3; App. Samn. 1
342 BC	Historical literature: E.T. Salmon (1967). Samnium and the Samnites. Cambridge U.P. p. 000.	
341 BC - peace treaty	The Romans renewed their attack, and the consul L. Aemilius Mamercinus invaded Samnium. The Samnites sent envoys to Rome to negotiate, and the peace treaty of 354 was renewed.	Livy 8.1-2
341 BC - peace treaty	Historical literature: E.T. Salmon (1967). Samnium and the Samnites. Cambridge U.P. p. 000.	

== Second Samnite War (326-304 BC) ==
The Second Samnite War broke out in 326 BC over Rome's attempts at colonizing Fregellae, which the Samnites considered their own. This quickly ended at the Battle of the Caudine Forks. The Romans gave up their colonies at Fregellae and Cales. The fighting resumed in 316 BC. For the next few years, Roman historians record Samnite invasions of Latium and Campania, but Rome's armies did recover and would then invade Samnium yearly until peace was made in 304 BC.

In addition to the gain of territory, some ancient sources suggest that the Romans adopted the manipular military formation of the Samnites as a result of their early successes. This formation later evolved into a military tactic that would allow the conquering of much of Europe.

Event	Details	Ancient sources
Foundation of Fregellae (328 BC)	The Romans founded a colony at Fregellae	refs
Foundation of Fregellae (328 BC)	Historical literature: E.T. Salmon (1967). Samnium and the Samnites. Cambridge U.P. pp. 217–8.	
Battle of the Caudine Forks (321 BC)	A Roman army under the command of Titus Veturius Calvinus was trapped by the Samnite general Gaius Pontius at the Caudine Forks, a pass in the Apennines between Calatia and Caudium, and forced to sue for peace. In the resulting peace, the Romans gave up their colonies at Fregellae and Cales.	Livy 9.1-7; Cic. Off. 3. 109; Cic. Sen. 41; Dion. Hal. 16.1.1-7; Valerius Maximus 5.1 ext. 5, 7.2. ext. 17; Gell. 17.21.36; Flor. 1.11.10; App. Samn. 2-7; Dio fr. 36.10; Oros. 3.15.1-6; Claud. Quad. fr. 18 (Peter)
Battle of the Caudine Forks (321 BC)	Historical literature: E.T. Salmon (1967). Samnium and the Samnites. Cambridge U.P. pp. 223–33.	
Battle of Lautulae (315 BC)	Q. Aulius Cerretanus, the Roman Master of Horse, was defeated and killed by the Samnites at Lautulae, a narrow pass near Tarracina	Liv. 9.22-25; Diod. 19.72.6-7; Fasti Capitolini (Degrassi) 36f., 109f., 418f.
Battle of Lautulae (315 BC)	Historical literature: E.T. Salmon (1967). Samnium and the Samnites. Cambridge U.P. p. 000.	

== Third Samnite War (298 to 290 BC) ==
According to Livy and Dionysius of Halicarnassus the war originated with a Samnite attack on the Lucanians. Romans began activities in Lucania which ignited hostilities. Unable to resist, the Lucanians sent ambassadors and hostages to Rome to plead for an alliance. The Romans decided to accept the alliance offer and sent fetials to insist the Samnites evacuate Lucania, but they refused and the war began. In 295 BC, the Romans defeated Samnites, Umbrians, and Gauls in the Battle of Sentinum in Umbria. In 291, a Roman consul defeated the Samnites at Aquilonia and established the colony of Venusia. The Samnites made peace again. This war secured Rome's leadership in Italy.

== See also ==
- List of Roman wars and battles

== Sources ==
- T.R.S. Broughton (1951), Magistrates of the Roman Republic, Case Western Reserve U.P.
- T.J. Cornell (1995), The Beginnings of Rome: Italy and Rome from the Bronze Age to thee Punic Wars, Routledge
- E.T. Salmon (1967), Samnium and the Samnites, Cambridge U.P.
- Boatwright, Mary T., Daniel J. Gargola, Noel Lenski, and Richard J. A. Talbert. The Romans: From Village to Empire: A History of Rome from Earliest Times to the End of the Western Empire, 2nd edition. Oxford University Press, 2012.
