= Roman army mutiny in 342 BC =

Notable mutiny by a Roman army (342 BC)

Several ancient authors have written descriptions of a Roman army mutiny in 342 BC. (Note: The Romans customarily dated events by noting which consuls held office that year, the mutiny took place in the year in which Quintus Servilius Ahala, for the third time, and Gaius Marcius Rutilus, for the fourth time, were consuls. When converted to the western calendar using the traditional Varronian chronology this year becomes 342 BC. However modern historians have shown that the Varronian chronology dates the mutiny four years too early due to inclusion of unhistorical "dictator years". Despite this known inaccuracy, the Varronian chronology remains in use by convention also in current academic literature. Forsythe(2005), pp. 369-370) According to the most well-known version, the mutiny originated in a group of Roman garrison soldiers wintering in Campania to protect the cities there against the Samnites. Subverted by the luxurious living of the Campanians, these soldiers conspired to take over their host cities. When the conspiracy was discovered, the conspirators formed a rebel army and marched against Rome. They were met by an army commanded by Marcus Valerius Corvus who had been nominated dictator to solve the crisis. Rather than do battle, Corvus managed to end the mutiny by peaceful means. All the mutineers received amnesty for their part in the rebellion and a series of laws were passed to address their political grievances.

All preserved accounts of the mutiny were however written several hundred years after the events they describe. Modern historians have found many elements in the classical accounts resembling the civil strife of the Late Republic which they consider anachronistic to the Roman Republic of the late 4th century BC. Some even believe the mutiny to be entirely invented by writers wishing to provide a context for the important political reforms they knew had been introduced in 342 BC.

== Classical accounts ==
The most extensive description of the mutiny, that has been preserved, is provided by Livy (59 BC - 17 AD), who makes it the closing episode of the Seventh Book of his history of Rome, Ab Urbe Condita. Livy knew of two conflicting accounts of the mutiny, descriptions of the first has been preserved in fragments of two other authors. A fragment of Dionysius of Halicarnassus's (c. 60 BC – after 7 BC) Roman Antiquities provides an elaborate description of the first half of the mutiny, but then breaks off. Another complete, but more summarily, account is preserved in a fragment from Appian's (c. 95 AD – c. 165 AD) Roman History. Similarities in wording makes it probable that Appian used Dionysius as his source.

=== First version, conspiracy at Capua ===
The backdrop of the first version is the First Samnite War which had broken out in 343 when Rome came to the aid of Capua and the Campanians against the Samnites. According to the ancient writers the Roman consul Marcus Valerius Corvus during that year campaigned in Campania and won two battles against the Samnites, at the Battle of Mount Gaurus and the Battle of Suessula. At the end of the campaign season the people of Suessula and Capua requested garrisons from Rome to defend them against the Samnites during the winter. According to Dionysius, the Roman Senate authorised Marcus Valerius to organise the garrisons, as large as the host cities wished to support. Valerius filled the garrisons with men who wished to stay and receive army rations and pay, mostly these were poor and homeless debt-ridden men. However the opulent decadence of Capua soon started to undermine the morale and patriotism of the Roman troops sent there and they started planning how to make themselves masters of Capua

The Romans elected Gaius Marcius Rutilus and Quintus Servilius Ahala as their consuls for 342. Campania was allotted Marcius, an experienced general and statesman who was now consul for the fourth time, and he discovered the conspiracy. Marcius caused a rumour to be spread that the troops would have the same winter quarters next year as well. Deprived of any sense of urgency the agitation died down. With the army settled into summer quarters, Marcius begun quietly to cleanse the army for mutinous elements. Some were discharged from service for having served their time or for disabilities, others were sent on furlough or transferred to serve elsewhere, all these were detained in Rome by the other consul and the praetor on various pretexts. At first glad to visit their homes, those sent away grew suspicious when they realised they were not to rejoin the army and that the leading agitators appeared to have been singled out. Concluding that their conspiracy had been discovered, they started to fear they would soon suffer court martial and secret execution. A cohort stationed at Anxur took up position at Lautulae where to intercept those men the consul was sending home. According to Dionysius and Appian the mutineers also recruited prisoners to their cause. At this point the fragment of Dionysius breaks off.

The army of the mutineers soon grew considerably in size, to about 20 000 men according to Appian. According to Livy they shifted their camp to below the hill of Alba Longa where they debated whom to offer leadership of their army. They decided upon Titus Quinctius (Note: It is possible this Titus Quinctius is identical to one of the many other T. Quinctii known from the 4th century, but he could also be a separate and otherwise unknown character. Oakley(1998), p. 374) who they learned was living in a villa nearby. This man came from a prominent patrician family, the Quinctii, and had had a distinguished military career, but a wound had made him lame in one foot and he had taken up a rural life far from Rome. Not expecting that he would accept leadership over them voluntarily, a party of the mutineers broke into Quinctius' house at night and carried him away to their camp where he was saluted as commander. On their own initiative the mutineers then broke camp and marched against Rome, only halting eight miles from the city when they learned that an army was marching against them, commanded by Marcus Valerius Corvus, who had been appointed dictator with Lucius Aemilius Mamercus as Master of the Horse

Livy writes that as soon as the enemy army came into view, the mutineers, who had never experienced civil war, started having second thoughts and negotiations were started. In a speech to the mutineers Marcus Valerius recalled their past services together while Titus Quinctius urged them to entrust themselves to Valerius and his reputation for integrity and sympathy for the common soldiers. The mutineers gave a shout of approval, whereupon Titus Quinctius urged Marcus Valerius to intervene on behalf of the mutineers and secure them from punishment.

Appian never mentions Titus Quinctius, possibly due to the briefness of his account. According to him, the mutineers were met at the Alban mount about one day's march from Rome by the army of the Dictator, Marcus Valerius Corvus. Corvus was reluctant to engage the mutineers in battle and instead set up camp while he investigated the matter further. The men of the two armies started to mingle, the mutineers complaining that their rebellion had been caused by the heavy debts they were suffering under at Rome. Unwilling to start a civil war, Corvus convinced the Senate to decree a cancellation of debts to all Romans, and immunity to the rebels. The mutineers then laid down their arms and returned to Rome.

=== Second version, mutiny in Rome ===
Livy also summarises a second version found in some annalists he had consulted. According to these there was no dictator, the affair was entirely handled by the consuls and the mutiny broke out in Rome itself. At night the conspirators seized one Gaius Manlius (Note: A Gaius Manlius was Military Tribune with Consular power in 379, otherwise this name is unknown in this time period. Oakley(1998), p. 388) from his bed to be their leader and marched out to establish a fortified position four miles from the city. The consuls moved against them with another army, but when the battle lines drew close, rather than fight, the soldiers of both sides exchanged greetings, clasped hands and embraced each other. Seeing that the soldiers were not interested in fighting, the consuls put proposals of reconciliation to the senate.

== Historicity of the mutiny ==
Much of the detail provided in the first version is of questionable historical accuracy. The first version with its focus on Campania follows smoothly from preceding events in the Samnite War, but it was not beyond ancient writers to invent such connections. Moral corruption from luxurious living in Campania is a common theme in Roman historical writing. The plot to seize Capua is similar to the actions of the Mamertines at Messina. The abduction of Titus Quinctius from his villa resembles the famous legend of Lucius Quinctius Cincinnatus being summoned from the plough to command Rome's army. It is more likely that some authors, perhaps Valerius Antias, have invented a dictatorship for Valerius Corvus than that others have chosen to omit it.

The second version also has several problems. It was recorded in fewer sources and shares similarities with the sedition of Marcus Manlius Capitolinus. There are other possible parallels as well. The centurion sent by Catiline to organise his conspiracy in Etruria in 63 BC was named Gaius Manlius. The story of how the consuls' and the mutineers' armies spontaneously made peace could be based on events in 83 BC when the army of consul Lucius Cornelius Scipio went over to Lucius Cornelius Sulla. If these two are true parallels, the second version of the mutiny must be a very late invention. It is possible then that both surviving versions of the mutiny have been invented by later annalists.

While most of the surviving narratives of the mutiny must probably be discarded as fiction, Oakley (1998) believes some kind of sedition actually took place in 342 which has later been embellished. All of Livy's sources recorded that a revolt took place, moreover some of the measures which according to Livy were passed in aftermath of the mutiny seems too obscure to have been invented out of nothing. Forsythe (2005) considers the mutiny a fiction invented by later Roman writers to provide context for the important laws that were passed this year.

== Political aftermath, the Leges Genuciae ==
=== Livy's account ===
According to Livy, Valerius brought forward a proposal granting immunity to all who had taken part in the secession during an assembly of the people at the Peteline Grove. A Lex Sacrata ("sacred law") that no one should be struck from the military list against his will was also passed, and furthermore a law that no one who had been military tribune could afterwards be centurion, this law was made due to one Publius Salonius, (Note: Otherwise unknown, Oakley(1998), p. 385) who had every year been either military tribune or first centurion, and that the cavalry should have their pay reduced for having acted against the mutineers. Some of Livy's sources also stated that a tribune of the plebs, Lucius Genucius, (Note: Otherwise unknown, possibly a relation of the consul for 365 and 362, Lucius Genucius Aventinensis Oakley(1998), p. 385) secured the passage of laws declaring usury illegal, that no one could be re-elected to the same office within less than ten years or hold more than one office at the same time, and that both consuls could be elected from the plebs. In Livy's opinion, the mutiny must have been of considerable strength if they managed to extract all these concessions.

=== Modern views ===
The Peteline Grove was also the location where Marcus Manlius was condemned, and is likely a fictional addition. It is unclear why the Romans needed a law protecting soldiers from involuntary delistment. Possibly the law was intended as a restriction on consular powers, especially if the consuls had used their powers arbitrarily to quell the mutiny. It has been suggested that debtors were protected from legal actions by creditors during terms of enlistment, and so maintaining a debtor's name on the list of service provided him some measure of protection. It is unlikely that purpose of the law barring military tribunes from becoming centurions were intended to protect military tribunes from demotion since the military tribunate had been made elective in 362. A possibility is that this law clearly defined the military tribune as outranking the centurion and ensured these two offices were held in ascending order. Another possibility is to accept the story of Publius Salonius as genuine. Perhaps already existing regulations had banned individuals from being military tribunes in consecutive years, but Salonius had broken these in spirit by repeated switches between first centurion and military tribune. In later years military tribunes were usually young men of prominent families while centurion was the highest rank a commoner could aspire to after years of military service. This important social distinction might have been caused either accidentally or deliberately by this law.

== Bibliography ==
- Forsythe, Gary (2005). A Critical History of Early Rome. Berkeley: University of California Press. ISBN 0-520-24991-7.
- Oakley, S. P. (1998). A Commentary on Livy Books VI-X, Volume II: Books VII-VII. Oxford: Oxford University Press. ISBN 978-0-19-815226-2.
