= Battle of Saticula =

Second of three battles described by the Roman historian Livy

- Part of The Samnite Wars
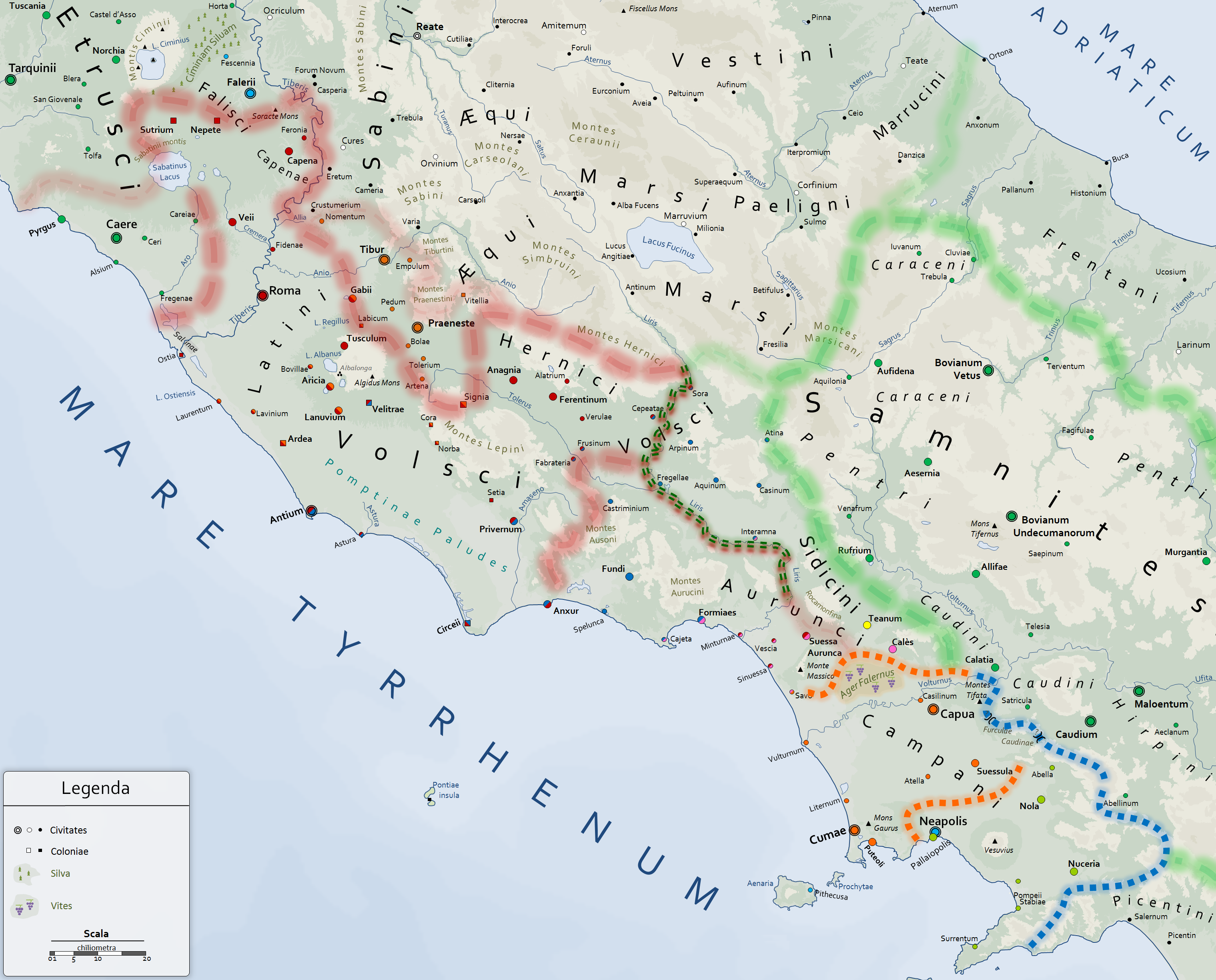
- Battle of Saticula
Date	343/339 BC (Note: Livy, as was customary in Rome, dated the battle by noting which consuls held office that year, it was the year in which M. Valerius Corvus, for the third time, and A. Cornelius Cossus were consuls. When converted to the western calendar using the traditional Varronian chronology, which Livy did not use, this becomes 343 BC. However modern historians have shown that the Varronian chronology dates the First Samnite War four years too early due to inclusion of unhistorical "dictator years". Despite this known inaccuracy, the Varronian chronology remains in use by convention also in current academic literature. Forsythe(2005), pp. 369-370)
Location	In the mountains near Saticula, Italy 41°05′00″N 14°30′00″E
Result	Roman victory

Belligerents
Roman Republic	Samnium

Commanders and leaders
Aulus Cornelius Cossus Arvina	Unknown

Strength
Unknown	Unknown

Casualties and losses
Unknown	Unknown
- Location within Italy

The Battle of Saticula, 343 BC, was the second of three battles described by the Roman historian Livy (59 BC – AD 17), in Book Seven of his history of Rome, Ab Urbe Condita, as taking place in the first year of the First Samnite War. According to Livy's extensive description, the Roman commander, the consul Aulus Cornelius Cossus was marching from Saticula (in southern Italy) when he was almost trapped by a Samnite army in a mountain pass. His army was only saved because one of his military tribunes, Publius Decius Mus, led a small group of men to seize a hilltop, distracting the Samnites and allowing the consul to escape. During the night Decius and his men were themselves able to escape. The next day the reunited Romans attacked the Samnites and completely routed them. Several other ancient authors also mention Decius' heroic acts. Modern historians are however sceptical of the historical accuracy of Livy's account, and have in particular noted the similarities with how a military tribune is said to have saved Roman army in 258 BC during the First Punic War.

== Background ==
According to Livy the First Samnite War started because the Samnites attacked the Sidicini, a tribe living north of Campania. The Campani, led by the city-state of Capua, sent an army to help the Sidicini, but were beaten in battle by the Samnites. The Samnites then invaded Campania and won a second battle on the plain near Capua. Facing defeat, the Campani appealed to Rome for aid. The Romans, despite having a treaty with the Samnites, agreed to help and declared war against the Samnites.

The two Roman consuls for 343 BC, Marcus Valerius Corvus and Aulus Cornelius Cossus, marched each of their armies against the Samnites. Valerius led his forces into Campania and Cornelius led his into Samnium where he camped at Saticula.

== The battle ==
Livy writes that Cornelius then advanced from Saticula and led his army through a mountain pass which descended into a narrow valley. Unnoticed by the consul the Samnites had occupied the surrounding heights and were waiting for the Roman army to descend into the valley. When the Romans finally discovered the enemy it was too late to retreat. P. Decius Mus, a Roman military tribune, observed that the Samnites had failed to occupy a hilltop overlooking the Samnite camp. With the consul's approval he led a detachment made up of the hastati and principes of one legion to seize the hill. The Samnites did not discover Decius until he was nearly at the summit and were then so distracted that they allowed the consul to withdraw the Roman army to more favourable ground.

With the escape of the consul the Samnites focused their attention on Decius and his men. They surrounded the hilltop, but had not yet decided whether to risk an assault when night set in. Surprised that he had not been attacked, Decius sneaked down with his centurions to scout out the Samnite positions. Once back in his camp, Decius silently assembled his men and informed them that he intended to break out at night, silently if they could, by force if they were discovered. Moving in the spaces between the Samnite pickets, the Romans were halfway through when they were discovered. But when Decius and his men let out a battle cry the awakening Samnites were flung into chaos and the Romans cut their way through. Next morning the Roman army celebrated the safe return of Decius and his men. At the urgings of Decius, the consul ordered his army to attack the Samnites. The Samnites were taken wholly unprepared for battle and were scattered and their camp taken. The 30,000 Samnites who had fled into the camp were all killed.

After the battle the consul summoned an army assembly where he presented Decius with a golden chaplet, a hundred oxen and one white ox with gilded horns. His men each received double rations, one ox and two tunics. The soldiers then gave Decius two grass crowns, the first for saving the whole army and the second for then saving his own men. While thus decorated, Decius sacrificed the white ox to Mars, and gave the one hundred oxen away to the men who had followed him. The army also contributed a pound of meal and a pint of wine to each of them.

This battle is also known from several other ancient authors, though not in the same detail as Livy's account. The battle is mentioned in fragments preserved from Dionysius and Appian's histories. Frontinus in his Stratagems lists twice how P. Decius' saved the army of Cornelius Cossus The anonymous author of the 4th century AD De viris illustribus attributes the acts of P. Decius to the Battle of Mount Gaurus. Cicero writes in his De Divinatione, that according to the annals, when Decius rushed boldly into battle and was warned to be more cautious, he replied that he had dreamt he would win great fame by dying in the midst of the enemy, foreshadowing his famous later death at the Battle of Vesuvius in 340 BC. This detail shows that some material on this battle existed which Livy did not include in his account.

== Aftermath ==
In addition to this battle, Livy records two more Roman victories in 343, won by the other consul, Valerius Corvus, at the battles of Mount Gaurus and Suessula. At the end of the campaign season both consuls were rewarded at Rome with a triumph. The Carthaginians, with whom the Romans had concluded a treaty of friendship in 348, congratulated Rome with her victories by sending a golden crown weighing twenty-five pounds for the Temple of Jupiter Optimus Maximus. According to the Fasti Triumphales, Valerius and Cornelius celebrated their triumphs over the Samnites on 21 September and 22 September respectively. For the next two years little fighting is recorded and First Samnite War ended in 341 with Rome and the Samnites renewing their treaty and the Samnites accepting the Roman alliance with the Campani.

== Modern views ==
Modern historians have doubted the historical accuracy of Livy's description of this battle. Livy's battle-scenes for this time period are mostly free reconstructions by him and his sources, and there is no compelling reason why this battle should be an exception. Samnite losses have clearly been exaggerated.

The exploits of Publius Decius takes up most of Livy's account, but as Livy himself noted, this story shares many similarities with an event said to have taken place on Sicily in 258 during the First Punic War. According to the ancient sources, in that year a Roman army was in danger of being trapped in a defile when a military tribune (the sources do not agree on his name) led a detachment of 300 men to seize a hilltop in the middle of the enemy. The Roman army escaped, but of the 300 only the tribune survived. It is unlikely that this latter, more famous, episode has not influenced the descriptions of the former.

E. T. Salmon's 1967 book also found several other similarities between this battle and later events which he considered suspicious. Both First and Second Samnite Wars start with an invasion of Samnium by a Cornelius, the way in which a Roman army was led into a trap resembles the famous disaster at the Caudine Forks in 321, and there are similarities to the campaigns of Publius Cornelius Arvina in 306 and Publius Decius Mus (the son of this battle's Decius) in 297. Salmon also thinks Valerius Corvus' Campanian victories in 343 could be doublets of Roman operations against Hannibal in the same area in 215. On the other hand, entries in the Fasti Triumphales support some measure of Roman success. In Salmon's reconstruction, there was only one battle in 343: perhaps fought on the outskirts of Capua near the shrine of Juno Gaura, and ending with a narrow Roman victory.

S. P. Oakley's 1998 book dismisses these claims of doublets and inclines towards believing there were three battles. Though Samnite ambushes are somewhat of a stock motif in Livy's narrative of the Samnite wars, this might simply reflect the mountainous terrain in which these wars were fought. While the story of Decius as preserved has been patterned after that of the military tribune of 258, Decius could still have performed some heroic act in 343, the memory of which became the origin of the later embellished tale.

Gary Forsythe's 2005 book considers the episode to have been invented, in part to foreshadow Decius' sacrifice in 340. P. Decius might have performed some heroic act which then enabled him to become the first of his family to reach the consulship, but if so no such detail survives. Instead, later annalists have combined the Caudine Forks disaster with the tale of the heroic tribune of 258 to produce the entirely fictitious story recorded by Livy (the difference being that while in the originals the Romans suffered defeat and death, here none of Decius' men are killed and the Romans win a great victory.)

== Bibliography ==
- Forsythe, Gary (2005). A Critical History of Early Rome. Berkeley: University of California Press. ISBN 0-520-24991-7.
- Oakley, S. P. (1998). A Commentary on Livy Books VI-X, Volume II: Books VII-VII. Oxford: Oxford University Press. ISBN 978-0-19-815226-2.
- Salmon, E. T. (1967). Samnium and the Samnites. Cambridge University Press. ISBN 978-0-521-13572-6.
