= Saticula =

Caudini city near the frontier of Campania in ancient Italy

Coordinates: 41°5′N 14°30′E

Saticula was a Caudini city near the frontier of Campania in southern Italy. In 343 BC, during the First Samnite War, the Roman consul Cornelius attacked it during the campaign against the Samnites in the Battle of Saticula.

Its archaeological remains are in the territory of the modern town of Sant'Agata de' Goti. Ceramic evidence from Saticula and nearby Caudium suggest that the two cities were part of a trade network along the Volturno River, linking the area with the rest of eastern Campagnia and the coast of the Tyrrhenian Sea, as well as to the northern areas, including the Pentri settlements of Bovianum and Saepinum.

== Fossil record ==
In 1995, the construction of the Trans-Mediterranean Pipeline excavated a fluvio-lacustrine succession that had been buried under volcanic deposits. Fossil bones and pollen samples were collected and further exploration continued in 2005, with a new trench dug to better access faunal and floral materials. The obtained pollen showed there had been a diverse vegetation cover of herbaceous and arboreal plants from different vegetation belts. There was a deciduous forest with a mixture of oak and hickory trees, along with hornbeam, elm, zelkova, and linden. The more mountainous forest was likely formed by species of cedars and hemlocks, with more evidence of fir and spruce close to the timberline. Herbs found at the site came mainly from the Poaceae and Asteraceae families, while the steppe plants from genera such as Artemisia and Ephedra were less common. A single grain of Quercus ilex, a Mediterranean oak, was discovered at the site in the second trench section.

The animal fossils identified at the site are: an unidentified species of rodent; an unidentified species hyena; an unidentified species of Elephantidae, believed to belong to the genus Mammuthus rather than to Elephas; Stephanorhinus hundsheimensis, an extinct species of rhino; Equus sussenbornensis, a species of equine; Hippopotamus antiquus, an extinct species of hippopotamus found in Europe; an unidentified species of Megacerini, an extinct genus of deer; and Axis eurygonos, an extinct species of cervid. Based on the combination of animal and plant remains, the time period of the fossils are considered part of the late Early Pleistocene to early Middle Pleistocene.
