= Mount Barbaro =

Mountain in Italy

- Mount Gauro
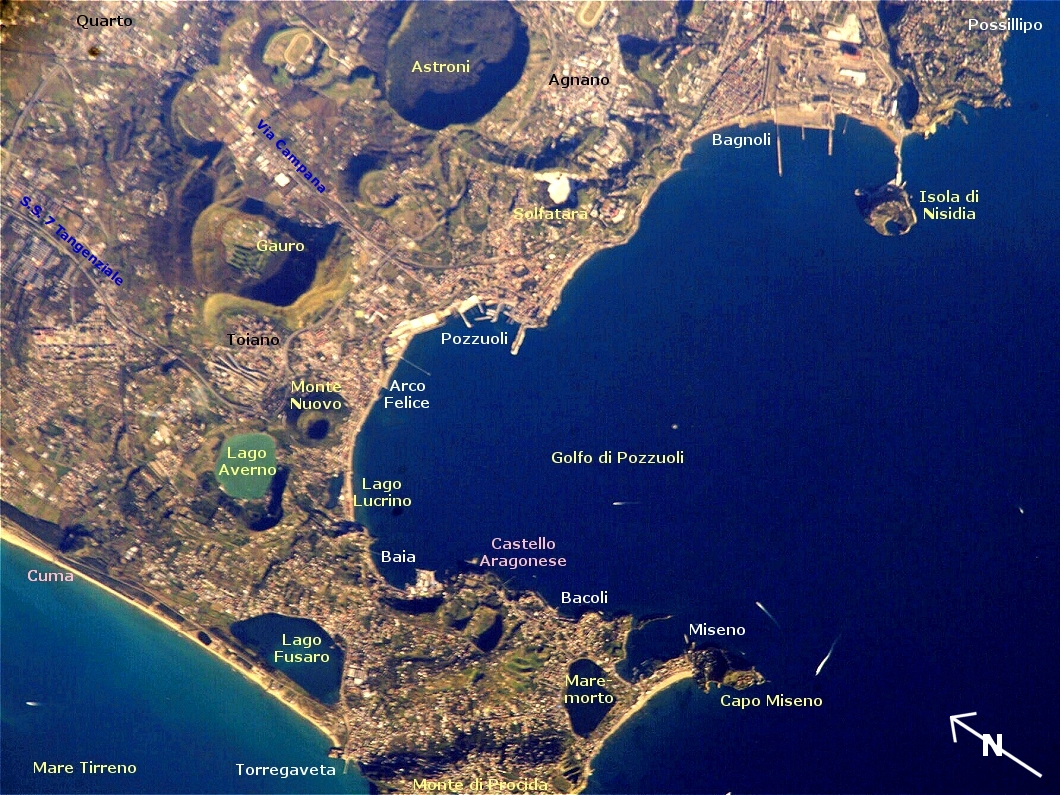
- NASA Space Shuttle photo of Campi Flegrei, showing Mount Gauro/Barbaro

Highest point
- Elevation: 331 m (1,086 ft)
- Coordinates: 40°49′37″N 14°08′20″E

Geography
- Location within Italy
- Location: Province of Naples, Italy

Geology
- Mountain type: Tuff cone
- Volcanic arc: Campanian volcanic arc
- Volcanic field: Phlegraean Fields

Mount Barbaro or Mount Gauro in Italy Monte Barbaro or Monte Gauro, is one of the eruptive vents of the Phlegraean Fields, a volcanic field of Italy located in Campania.

== Geography ==
Mount Barbaro is a tuff cone containing zeolite. Its structure consists of layers of ash either parallel or overlapping them, including lenticular masses of pumice agglomerated. The tuff cone was built on unknown and covered by a paleosol represented mainly by deposits of the Archiaverno, another tuff cone located to the west.

The crater, oval, is fused to another unnamed crater west. Its rim is the highest in the south and rises to 331 metres (1,086 ft).

== History ==
The date of the volcanic eruption that formed the Mount Barbaro is unknown but it was manifested by phreatomagmatic eruption.

The Battle of Mount Gaurus was fought in 342 BC at the foot of the mountain during First Samnite War. The ancient Romans, led by Marcus Valerius Corvus, defeated the Samnites.
