= Battle of Suessula =

Battle in 343 BC

Coordinates: 40°59′N 14°24′E

- Part of The Samnite Wars
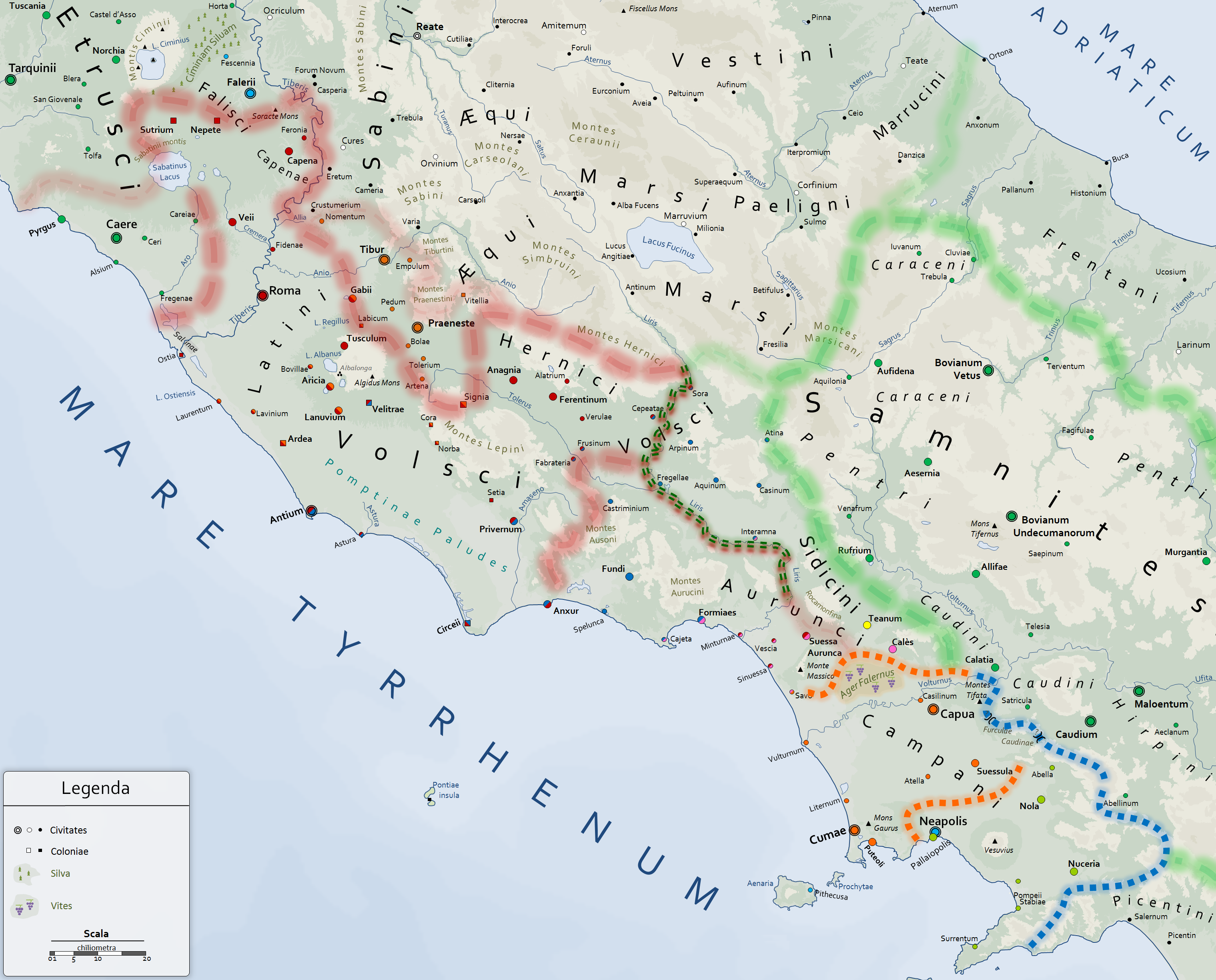
Date	343/339 BC (Note: Livy, as was customary in Rome, dated the battle by noting which consuls held office that year, it was the year in which M. Valerius Corvus, for the third time, and A. Cornelius Cossus were consuls. When converted to the western calendar using the traditional Varronian chronology, which Livy did not use, this becomes 343 BC. Modern historians have shown that the Varronian chronology dates the First Samnite War four years too early, due to inclusion of unhistorical "dictator years". Despite this known inaccuracy, the Varronian chronology remains in use by convention also in current academic literature. Forsythe(2005), pp. 369-370)
Location	Near Suessula, Italy
Result	Roman victory

Belligerents
Roman Republic	Samnium

Commanders and leaders
Marcus Valerius Corvus	Unknown

Strength
Unknown	Unknown

Casualties and losses
Unknown	Unknown

The Battle of Suessula was the third and last battle between the Samnites and the Roman Republic in 343 BC, the first year of the First Samnite War. According to the Augustan historian Livy, the Samnites gathered their army at Suessula, at the eastern edge of Campania. The Roman consul Marcus Valerius Corvus took his army by forced marches to Suessula. When the Samnites had to scatter their army to forage for food, Valerius seized the opportunity to capture the Samnite camp and then rout the Samnite foragers. Modern historians believe that details of the battle were entirely invented by Livy and his annalistic sources, and the battle's historicity has also been questioned.

== Background ==
According to Livy the First Samnite War started because the Samnites attacked the Sidicini, a tribe living north of Campania. The Campani, led by the city-state of Capua, sent an army to help the Sidicini, but were beaten in battle by the Samnites. The Samnites then invaded Campania and won a second battle on the plain near Capua. Facing defeat, the Campani appealed to Rome for aid. The Romans, despite having a treaty with the Samnites, agreed to help and declared war against the Samnites.

The two Roman consuls for 343, Marcus Valerius Corvus and Aulus Cornelius Cossus, marched each their armies against the Samnites. Valerius led his into Campania and Cornelius his into Samnium. In Campania, Valerius won the first Roman victory against the Samnites in the Battle of Mount Gaurus near Cumae, while Cornelius in the Battle of Saticula turned a near disaster into a second Roman victory thanks to the heroism of Publius Decius Mus.

== Battle ==
Livy, who is the only source for this battle, writes that the Samnites, even after two defeats determined to achieve victory, brought their whole army to Suessula. When news of this reached Valerius from Capua, he detached a strong force to protect his camp and baggage, and proceeded by forced marches to Suessula. There he established camp close to the enemy, since he had not brought any baggage or camp followers, his camp was much smaller than normal. The Samnites formed battle lines and marched towards the Roman camp, believing there would soon be a battle. When the Samnites learnt from their scouts of the small size of the Roman camp, they believed only a small Roman force were opposing them. The Samnite soldiers wanted to assault the Roman camp at once, but were restrained from by their generals. Owing to their large numbers and long stay outside Suessula, the Samnites were now running out of supplies. Believing the Romans to be too weak to venture outside their camp and short on food as well, the Samnites decided to send foragers into the fields. Seeing the Samnites scattered and their camp weakly held, Valerius led his men in an attack on the Samnite camp, which was captured in the first assault. Leaving two legions to hold the Samnite camp, Valerius ordered his men forward to round up the Samnite foragers. The scattered Samnites were slaughtered or fled in fear. The Roman spoils included 40 000 shields, due to the Samnite flight a far larger number than the enemy slain, and 170 standards.

== Aftermath ==
Livy records that with the campaign season now at an end, both consuls were rewarded at Rome with a triumph. The Carthaginians, with whom the Romans had concluded a treaty of friendship in 348, congratulated Rome with her victories by sending a golden crown weighing twenty-five pounds for the Temple of Jupiter Optimus Maximus. The Fasti Triumphales record that Valerius and Cornelius celebrated their triumphs over the Samnites on 21 September and 22 September respectively. Little fighting occurred over the two next years. The First Samnite War ended in 341 with Rome and the Samnites renewing their treaty and the Samnites accepting the Roman alliance with the Campani.

== Modern views ==
Modern historians have doubted the historical accuracy of Livy's description of this battle. Livy's battle scenes for this time period are mostly free reconstructions by him and his sources, and there is no reason that this battle should be an exception. The amount of spoils taken and the Samnite losses imply a clear exaggeration. Edward Togo Salmon suspected Valerius' victories in 343 could be doublets of Roman operations against Hannibal in the same area in 215. Since the testimony of the Fasti Triumphales require some degree of Roman success in 343, Salmon therefore proposed that there was only one battle in 343, fought on the outskirts of Capua near the shrine of Juno Gaura, which Livy or his source has then confused with Mount Gaurus. These proposed doublets are rejected by S.P. Oakley, who inclines towards believing the Romans and Samnites fought three battles in 343. The location of two of the battles at Mount Gaurus and Suessula could reflect a twin Samnite attack on Cumae and Capua.

== Bibliography ==
- Forsythe, Gary (2005). A Critical History of Early Rome. Berkeley: University of California Press. ISBN 0-520-24991-7.
- Oakley, S. P. (1998). A Commentary on Livy Books VI-X, Volume II: Books VII-VII. Oxford: Oxford University Press. ISBN 978-0-19-815226-2.
- Salmon, E. T. (1967). Samnium and the Samnites. Cambridge University Press. ISBN 978-0-521-13572-6.
