= Battle of Mount Gaurus =

First battle of the First Samnite War

- Part of The Samnite Wars
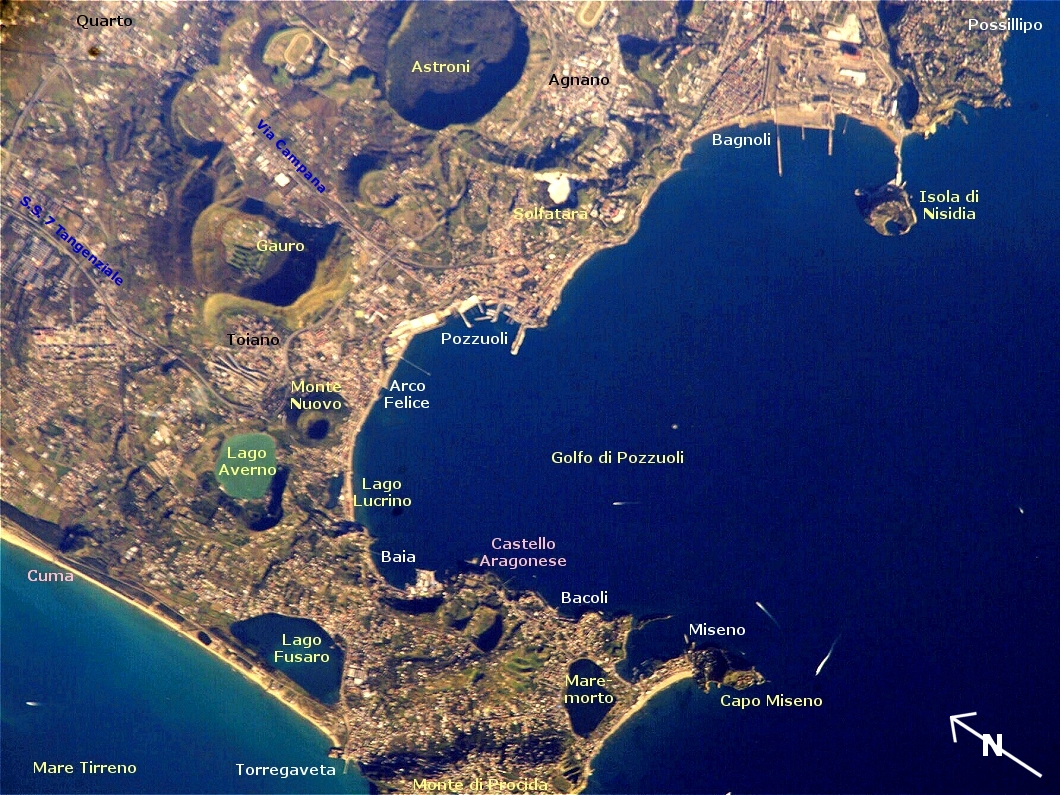
- Map showing the location of Mount Gaurus, labelled Gauro on the map
Date	343/339 BC (Note: Livy, as was customary in Rome, dated the battle by noting which consuls held office that year. It was the year in which M. Valerius Corvus and A. Cornelius Cossus were consuls, Corvus for the third time. When converted to the western calendar using the traditional Varronian chronology, which Livy did not use, this becomes 343 BC. However, modern historians have shown that the Varronian chronology dates the First Samnite War four years too early due to inclusion of unhistorical "dictator years". Despite this known inaccuracy, the Varronian chronology remains in use by convention also in academic literature. Forsythe(2005), pp. 369–370)
Location	Mount Gaurus, near Cumae, Italy 40°50′55″N 14°03′13″E
Result	Roman victory

Belligerents
Roman Republic	Samnium

Commanders and leaders
Marcus Valerius Corvus	Unknown

Strength
Unknown	Unknown

Casualties and losses
Unknown	Unknown
- Location within Italy

The Battle of Mount Gaurus, 343 BC, was the first battle of the First Samnite War and also the first battle fought between the Roman Republic and the Samnites. The battle is described by the Roman historian Livy (59 BC – AD 17) as part of Book Seven of his history of Rome, Ab Urbe Condita Libri, where he narrates how the Roman consul Marcus Valerius Corvus won a hard-fought battle against the Samnites at Mount Gaurus, near Cumae, in Campania. Modern historians however believe that most, if not all, of the detail in Livy's description has been invented by him or his sources.

== Background ==
According to Livy, the First Samnite War started because the Samnites attacked the Sidicini, a tribe living north of Campania. The Campani, led by the city-state of Capua, sent an army to help the Sidicini, but were beaten in battle by the Samnites. The Samnites then invaded Campania and won a second battle on the plain near Capua. Facing defeat, the Campani appealed to Rome for aid. The Romans, despite having a treaty with the Samnites, agreed to help and declared war against the Samnites.

The two Roman consuls for 343, Marcus Valerius Corvus and Aulus Cornelius Cossus, both marched their armies against the Samnites - Valerius into Campania and Cornelius into Samnium.

== Battle ==
Valerius camped his army at Mount Gaurus. The Samnites had moved into Campania in force, believing this would be the main theatre of war, and were eager to fight. After testing his enemy's strength for a few days with skirmishers, Valerius prepared the Roman army for battle. The Romans marched out of camp and a battle ensued. The battle went on for some time, as with the two sides evenly matched neither could gain the upper hand. Valerius therefore ordered a cavalry charge in an attempt to break the Samnite lines. The charge failed and the Roman cavalry had to pull back. With the Roman cavalry retreated, a dismounted Valerius decided to lead an infantry assault in person, but once again the Samnite lines did not break despite taking dreadful losses. The battle had now lasted a long time and daylight was fading. The Romans, weary but fuelled by rage and disappointment, made one last attack. At last the Samnites fled, and not many would have survived if nightfall had not put an end to the pursuit. When asked why in the end they had fled, the Samnites answered it was "the eyes of the Romans, which seemed to them to blaze, along with their furious expression and frenzied glare". During the night the Samnites departed and left the Romans to take possession of their camp on the next day. All the Campani came out to congratulate the Romans on their victory.

== Aftermath ==
Livy records two more Roman victories against the Samnites in 343, a victory by the other consul, Cornelius Cossus, at the Battle of Saticula, and a second victory by Valerius Corvus at the Battle of Suessula. At the end of the campaign season both consuls were rewarded at Rome with a triumph. The Carthaginians, with whom the Romans had concluded a treaty of friendship in 348, congratulated Rome for her victories by sending a golden crown weighing twenty-five pounds for the Temple of Jupiter Optimus Maximus. According to the Fasti Triumphales, Valerius and Cornelius celebrated their triumphs over the Samnites on 21 September and 22 September respectively. For the two next years little fighting is recorded and the First Samnite War ended in 341 with Rome and the Samnites renewing their treaty and the Samnites accepting the Roman alliance with the Campani.

== Modern views ==
Modern historians believe little, if any, of the detail provided by Livy for this battle derives from authentic records. Livy's battle scenes for this time period are mostly free reconstructions by him and his sources, and the Battle of Mount Gaurus would be particularly susceptible to such inventions, as it was the historic first battle between Romans and Samnites. Samnite losses have clearly been exaggerated. The role of Valerius Corvus in the events of the First Samnite War might also have been exaggerated, especially, if as Salmon (1967) held, Valerius Antias was Livy's chief source for this part of his work, but other historians than Antias were capable of exaggerating the Valerii as well. Salmon (1967) suspected Valerius' victories in 343 could be doublets of Roman operations against Hannibal in the same area in 215, he also doubted the location of the battle at Mount Gaurus, close to Cumae, but far from Capua. Since the testimony of the Fasti Triumphales require some degree of Roman success in 343 and arguing that in this time period the Romans were more likely to defeat the Samnites on level than mountainous ground, Salmon (1967) therefore proposed that there was only one battle in 343 which was fought on the outskirts of Capua near the shrine of Juno Gaura, which Livy or his source had confused with Mount Gaurus. This would explain Livy's description of the Capuans coming out to congratulate the Romans. The battle might not have been such a total rout of the Samnites as Livy describes. Fighting interrupted by nightfall was often used by Roman historians to hide Roman failures. This reconstruction is rejected by Oakley (1998) who does not believe there are any doublets in Livy's account for 343. The Samnites would have gained significant ground in Campania by the time the Romans arrived and Valerius' two victories could be the outcome of twin Samnite attacks on Capua and Cumae.

== See also ==
- List of Roman battles

== Bibliography ==
- Forsythe, Gary (2005). A Critical History of Early Rome. Berkeley: University of California Press. ISBN 0-520-24991-7.
- Oakley, S. P. (1998). A Commentary on Livy Books VI–X, Volume II: Books VII–VII. Oxford: Oxford University Press. ISBN 978-0-19-815226-2.
- Salmon, E. T. (1967). Samnium and the Samnites. Cambridge University Press. ISBN 978-0-521-13572-6.
