= Suessula =

Ancient city of Campania

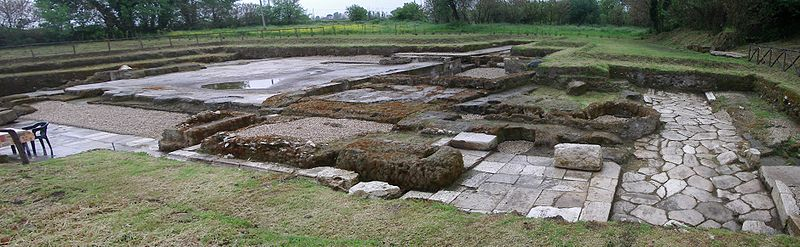
- Interactive map of Suessula
- 40°59′23.47″N 14°23′53.41″E
- Type: Settlement
- Location: Province of Naples, Italy
- Region: Campania

Suessula was an ancient city of Campania, southern Italy, situated in the interior of the peninsula, near the frontier with Samnium, between Capua and Nola, and about 7 km northeast of Acerrae, Suessula is now a vanished city and the archeological site belongs to the city of Acerra, and not to San Felice a Cancello as reported in some sources.

== History ==
=== Ancient ===
Suessula is repeatedly mentioned during the wars between Romans and Samnites, as well as in the Second Punic War against Hannibal. Thus in the First Samnite War (343 BC) it was the scene of a decisive victory by Marcus Valerius Corvus over the Samnites, who had gathered together the remains of their army which had been previously defeated at Mount Gaurus (Livy vii. 37). In the following Campanian War the Suessulani followed the fortunes of the citizens of Capua, and shared the same fate, so that at the close of the contest, in 338 BC, they must have obtained the status of civitas, but without the right of suffrage (Id. viii. 14).

In the Second Punic War the city played a considerable part, though apparently more from its position than its own importance. Suessula was on the line of the Via Popillia, which was here intersected by a road which ran from Neapolis through Acerrae, and on to the Via Appia, which it reached just west of the Caudine pass. The line of hills which rises from the level plain of Campania immediately above Suessula, and forms a kind of prolongation of the ridge of Mount Tifata, was a station almost as convenient as that mountain itself, and in 216 BCE, it was occupied by M. Claudius Marcellus with the view of protecting Nola, and watching the operations of Hannibal against that city (Liv. xxiii. 14, 17). From this time the Romans seem to have kept up a permanent camp there for some years, which was known as the Castra Claudiana, from the name of Marcellus who had first established it, and which is continually alluded to during the operations of the subsequent campaigns (Liv. xxiil. 31, xxiv. 46, 47, xxv. 7, 22, xxvi. 9).

After this period, Suessula fades into obscurity. It continued to be a municipal town of Campania, though apparently one of a secondary class; and inscriptions attest its municipal rank under the Roman Empire. It had received a body of veterans as colonists under Sulla, but did not attain the colonial rank (Strabo v. p. 249; Plin. iii. 5. s. 9; Orell. Inscr. 129, 130, 2333; Lib. Col. p. 237). The Tabula Peutingeriana places it on a line of road from Capua to Nola, at the distance of 9 miles from each of those cities (Tab. Peut).

=== Middle Ages and modern ===
Suessula was an episcopal see in the first ages of Christianity, until at least the 10th century. It was for a time the chief town of a small Longobards gastaldate. It was several times plundered by the Saracens, and at last abandoned by the inhabitants in consequence of malaria. The ruins of the town lie within the Bosco d'Acerra, a picturesque forest, about 7 km south of Maddaloni, and an adjacent castle is still called Torre di Sessola. They were more conspicuous in the 19th century than they now are, but traces of the theater may still be seen, and debris of other buildings. Oscan tombs were excavated there between 1878 and 1886, and important finds of vases and bronzes have been made. The dead were generally buried within slabs of tuff arranged to form a kind of sarcophagus. Inscriptions, as well as capitals of columns and other architectural fragments, have been found there (Francesco Maria Pratilli, Via Appia, iii. 3. p. 347; Romanelli, vol. iii. p. 590).
