= Varronian chronology =

Commonly-accepted chronology of early Roman history

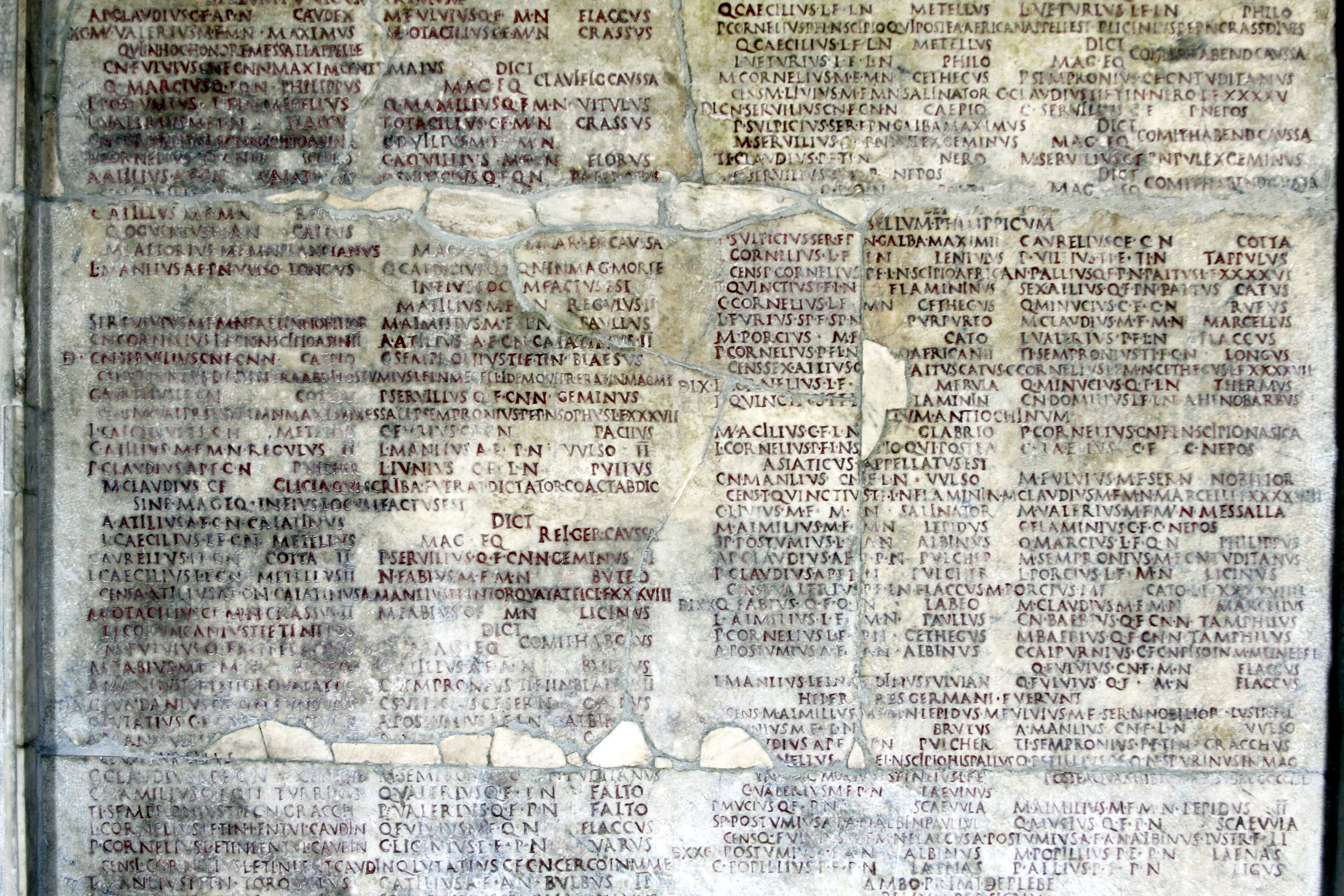
Detail from the fasti Capitolini, which (with a few deviations) employed the Varronian chronological scheme

The Varronian chronology is the commonly accepted chronology of early Roman history named after the Roman antiquarian Marcus Terentius Varro. It is from this chronology that the commonly used dates for the foundation of the city (753 BC), the overthrow of the monarchy (509 BC), the Decimvirates (451–450 BC), the Gallic sack of Rome (390 BC), and the first plebeian consul (366 BC) are derived. The chronology consists of an ordered list of magisterial colleges (eg pairs of consuls) which, in modern times, are regularly assigned to years BC.

The years given by the Varronian chronology prior to 300 BC should not be accepted as absolute dates. Years in the chronology are also demonstrably incorrect and it flows four years prior to actual events by 340 BC. Moreover, Roman historians and antiquarians (most especially Livy and Dionysius of Halicarnassus) also did not all use Varro's scheme. Because both the ordering and absolute position of Varronian years is not well established for this early period, the numeric years derived from it should be taken as "no more than numerical symbols for specific consular years".

Because the Varronian chronology places the foundation of Rome on 21 April 753 BC, it is also the basis for the Varronian years ab urbe condita (AUC; lit. 'from the founding of the city'). Other chronologies place Rome's foundation in different years BC, meaning that they would place the same event in different years AUC. Romans of the historical period did not use the Varronian chronology or ab urbe condita for everyday timekeeping. Dates were instead kept in reference to a certain year's consuls: eg that an event occurred during the consulship of Marcus Tullius Cicero and Gaius Antonius Hybrida (63 BC).

== Construction ==
The ancient Romans customarily reckoned years by consular dating. For example, the year AD 1 was not assigned a number in a sequence, as modern years are reckoned, but rather a name: in this instance the year of the consulship of Gaius Caesar and Lucius Aemilius Paullus. Determining when a recorded event occurred therefore requires knowing the names of the consuls as a reference, for which there are accurate records back to 300 BC. Prior to that point, however, records are fragmentary and many Romans reconstructed those records into differing consular sequences. Livy and Dionysius of Halicarnassus in their respective works – Ab urbe condita and Roman Antiquities – used separate schemes which place the same consuls in different years.

The specific years BC assigned by the various chronologies to consular colleges should be taken as an unordered numeric identifier for those colleges rather than absolute years. The chronologies differ largely in how they order the consular colleges and how many such colleges they have between any two specific consular years.

=== Problems ===
Roman records prior to around 300 BC were fragmentary or incomplete. The ancient Roman historians, writing centuries after the events they purport to describe, were themselves unclear about the order or identities of some magisterial years. The most well known problems are with the fictitious "dictator" and "anarchy years".

The Varronian years 333, 324, 309, and 301 BC, the "dictator years", are supposed to have had a dictator and magister equitum hold office in place of the normal consuls. They are, however, largely rejected by modern scholars as a fabrication. They appear nowhere in other late republican sources. Moreover, removal of these four fictitious years is further supported by modern astronomy. Livy records an eclipse during the consulship of Gaius Marcius Rutilus and Titus Manlius Torquatus which corresponds to the Varronian year 344 BC. Modern astronomy, however, dates the same event to 15 September 340 BC, indicating that Varro placed those consuls four years prior to their absolute dates.

A separate five year period, called the "anarchy years", occurred in the Varronian years 375–371 BC. No magistrates were allegedly elected. No trace of these "anarchy years" is present in the earlier works of Fabius Pictor. These were likely added to synchronise Roman and Greek histories by lengthening the Roman fourth century BC. The years are likely not historical – and are regardless not recorded by Diodorus, who reports only one year of anarchy, but are recorded in ancient historiography as far back as Polybius. The "anarchy years" are also widely rejected by scholars.

=== Sources and method ===
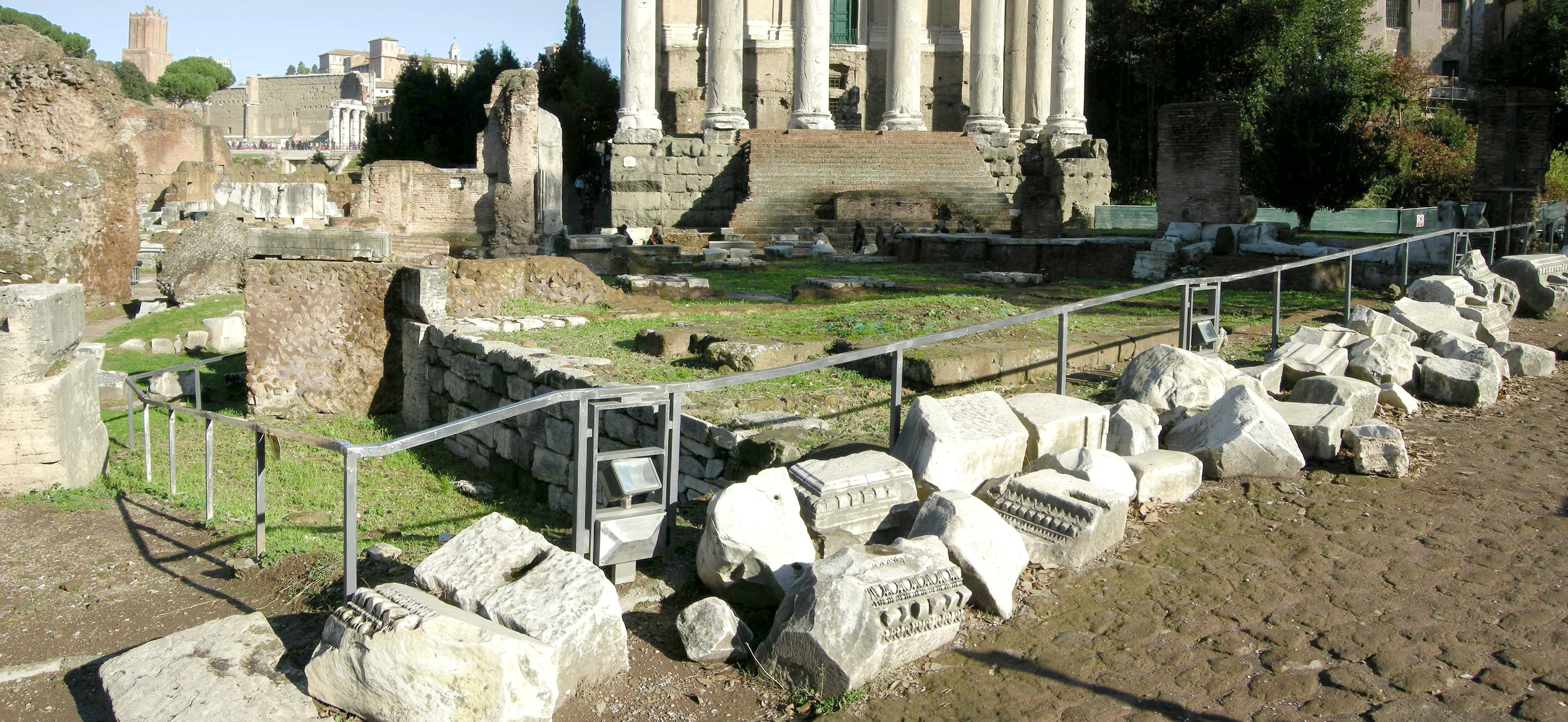
The pontifex maximus' official house was the Regia (ruins thereof pictured). The primary source for the Roman histories and their chronologies, the annales maximi, were kept within.

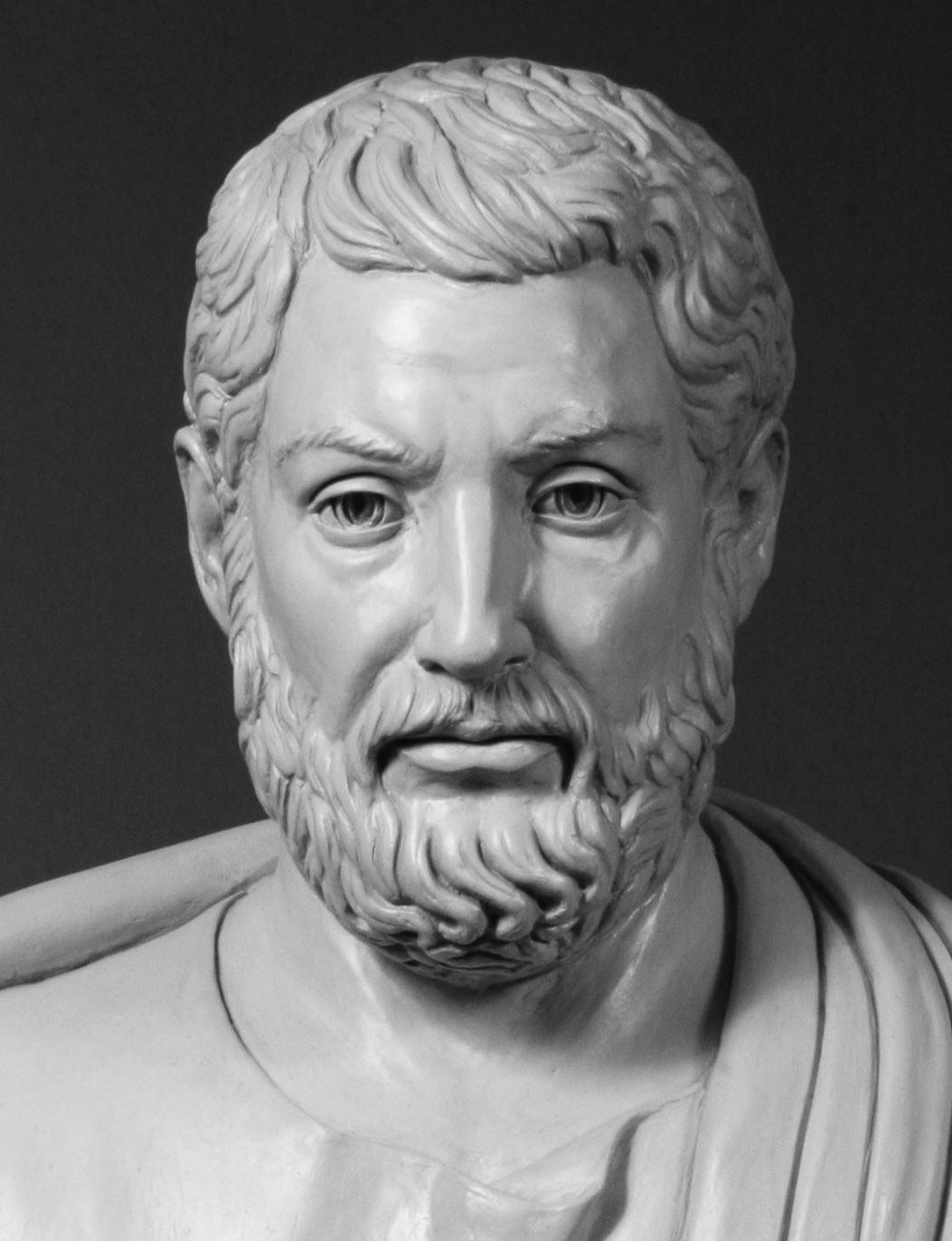
Modern bust of Cleisthenes. He is credited with the establishment of Athenian democracy in 509 BC. Roman historians synchronised this year with the foundation of their republic.

The Varronian chronology, somewhat confusingly given its name, was first published by the Roman antiquarian Titus Pomponius Atticus in his Liber Annalis in 47 BC. The two men, Atticus and Varro, may however have worked together on their shared antiquarian interests. Many of its features likely stem from attempts to harmonise Roman and Greek evidence.

The Roman evidence starts c. 200 BC when the first histories of Rome started to be written. It is not known what those earlier Romans, such as Fabius Pictor, knew for certain and to what extent they made up material for their narratives. The traditional view among scholars is that these early sources relied on the annales maximi, an annual chronicle kept by the pontifex maximus, which listed all the republican magistrates as well as various events. It is from these annales which the Varronian chronology was derived by secondary and artificial reconstruction. The annales were displayed at the Regia, the pontifex maximus' official house; the neighbourhood was burnt repeatedly, however, through the third and second centuries. Some more critical scholars such as T P Wiseman and G S Bucher believe it unlikely that the original records could have escaped repeated fires over the three hundred years between the start of the republic and when the first Roman historians started writing c. 200 BC. They instead suggest that the original sources themselves were fragmentary and incomplete, casting substantial doubt on the historicity of the various chronologies (whether Varronian or not) that survive to modern times. Others, such as B W Frier, suggest that the annales maximi were likely created in latter half of the last century BC and were themselves embellished with unreliable details.

The Greek evidence starts before the Roman histories. Greek histories had started with Herodotus, who lived centuries before Fabius Pictor. The two most important Greek historians for early Rome and its chronology were Hieronymus of Cardia and Timaeus of Tauromenium. These historians produced accounts of early Roman archaeologia (origins) which were then employed by later antique historians. Timaeus provided useful benchmarks for events described in Roman history: he places the Battle of Aricia in 504 BC; he was also the probable source of the synchronism – a claim that certain events occurred around the same time – of the Gallic sack of Rome with the Peace of Antalcidas and the siege of Rhegium by Dionysius of Syracuse in 386.

Since Roman records had only preserved enough consular colleges to place the Gallic sack in 381 BC, the early compilers of the fasti seemingly invented five years of anarchy to align that event with the Greek-derived date of 386. The four dictator years – 333, 324, 309, and 301 BC – may have been an alternative device to harmonize the same discrepancy, but the Varronian chronology included both them and the five-year anarchy, pushing the date of the Gallic sack further back to 390 BC. It has also been suggested that the Varronian dates of 754/3 and 390 were invented in order to organize Roman history as a series of 365-year cycles, the first corresponding to the period between Romulus and Camillus, and the second to the period between Camillus and the Augustan principate. Removing both the dictator and anarchy years would yield a chronology similar to that of Livy, which reports the foundation of the republic c. 501 BC, although doubts have been expressed about the reliability of the earlier reaches of the consular fasti.

Beyond mere synchronism, Varro's chronology is thought to have been constructed by arbitrary calculation. Varro's year for the foundation of Rome, for example, derives first from a synchronous assumption that the monarchy was overthrown in the same year as that of the expulsion of the Athenian tyrant Hippias (509 BC) and the establishment of Athenian democracy. The second portion is merely a calculation assuming that the city was founded seven generations – corresponding to the seven canonical kings of Rome – of 35 years earlier.

== Adoption and legacy ==
The Varronian chronology was adopted by the Roman state during the first century BC and gave rise to the traditional years ab urbe condita ("from the founding of the city"); most especially, those dates were used in monumental Augustan-era inscriptions, the fasti Capitolini and the fasti Triumphales.

T R S Broughton, in the Magistrates of the Roman republic, on examination of the "dictator years" instead put forward the Livian chronology as an alternative. Tim Cornell, in Beginnings of Rome, instead prefers the Dionysian chronology. However, use of the "official" chronology passed from the Roman state is well-entrenched in modern historiography.

== See also ==
- Fasti Consulares
- History of Rome (Livy)

== Bibliography ==
- Broughton, Thomas Robert Shannon (1951). The magistrates of the Roman republic. Vol. 1. New York: American Philological Association.
- Cornell, Tim (1995). The beginnings of Rome. London: Routledge. ISBN 0-415-01596-0. OCLC 31515793.
- Drummond, A (1978). "The dictator years". Historia: Zeitschrift für Alte Geschichte. 27 (4): 550–572. ISSN 0018-2311. JSTOR 4435634.
- Drummond, A (1989). "Rome in the fifth century II: the citizen community". In Walbank, F W; et al. (eds.). The rise of Rome to 220 BC. Cambridge Ancient History. Vol. 7 Pt. 2 (2nd ed.). Cambridge University Press. ISBN 0-521-23446-8.
- Forsythe, Gary (2005). A critical history of early Rome. Berkeley: University of California Press. ISBN 978-0-520-94029-1. OCLC 70728478.
- Grafton, A T; Swerdlow, N M (1985). "Technical chronology and astrological history in Varro, Censorinus and others". Classical Quarterly. 35 (2): 454–465. doi:10.1017/S0009838800040295. ISSN 0009-8388. JSTOR 639075.
- Lomas, Kathryn (2018). The rise of Rome. History of the Ancient World. Cambridge: Harvard University Press. doi:10.4159/9780674919938. ISBN 978-0-674-65965-0. S2CID 239349186.
- Mineo, Bernard, ed. (2015). A companion to Livy. Malden: Wiley Blackwell. ISBN 978-1-118-33893-3. OCLC 885548069.
  - Humm, Michel. "From 390 BC to Sentinum: political and ideological aspects". In Mineo (2015), pp. 342–66.
- Wilson, Mark (2021). Dictator: the evolution of the Roman dictatorship. Ann Arbor: University of Michigan Press. ISBN 978-0-472-12920-1. OCLC 1243162549.
- Wiseman, T P (1996). "What do we know about early Rome?". Journal of Roman Archaeology. 9: 310–15. doi:10.1017/S1047759400016664. ISSN 1047-7594.
