= Gaius Maenius =

Roman consul 338 BC

Gaius Maenius (possibly Gaius Maenius Antiaticus) was a Roman statesman and general who was elected consul in 338 BC and appointed dictator twice, in 320 BC and 314 BC.

== Consulship and the Latin War ==
Hailing from a plebeian family, Maenius was elected consul in 338 BC alongside Lucius Furius Camillus during the final stages of the Second Latin War. He commanded the Roman naval forces which defeated the combined Latin armies of Antium, Lanuvium, Aricia and Velitrae at the Battle of Antium on the river Astura, thereby completing the conquest of Latium. After this victory, he took the six rostra (rams from the prows of the enemy warships) and placed them in what became known as the Rostra, decorating the stage in the Roman Forum from which the orators would address the people. After this victory, both Maenius and his colleague were awarded triumphs, and in a rare show of appreciation, both had equestrian statues erected to them in the Roman Forum. His statue was placed upon a column, called the Columna Maenia, which stood near the end of the Forum, on the Capitoline. In addition, it is also possible that he took the cognomen Antiaticus in remembrance of this victory.

== Dictatorships and Censor ==
In 320 BC, Maenius was appointed dictator, for the purpose of investigating a number of plots and conspiracies involving some of the most prominent of Roman noble families, together with the leading citizens of Capua. Maenius appointed Marcus Foslius Flaccinator as his magister equitum, and both men proceeded to investigate the matter thoroughly, to the point that many of the Roman nobility began to resent his uncovering their plots, while Capua proceeded to revolt against Rome in 319 BC. The situation soon reached crisis point, as the Roman nobility demanded that charges be laid against both Maenius and Foslius. Both men resigned their office and demanded that the consuls, Lucius Papirius Cursor and Quintus Publilius Philo give them a trial. The consuls agreed, and both men were acquitted.

With his reputation intact, Maenius was appointed censor in 318 BC, alongside Lucius Papirius Crassus. During his period in office he provided buildings in the Forum's neighborhood with balconies, which were called after him maeniana, in order that the spectators might have more room to view games within temporary wooden arenas set up in the forum. Then in 314 BC, during another phase of the Second Samnite War, rumors began to filter to Rome about another conspiracy in Capua, led by Ovius and Novius Calavius, this time with the intent of detaching Campania from the Roman alliance and joining the Samnites. Alarmed, Rome again appointed Maenius as dictator, and he again turned to his trusted subordinate, Foslius, as his magister equitum. Before the dictator's investigation could begin, and evidence could be given against them, the brothers took their own lives, thereby escaping trial.

== Notes ==
Political offices
Preceded by Tiberius Aemilius Mamercinus and Quintus Publilius Philo	Consul of the Roman Republic with Lucius Furius Camillus; 338 BC	Succeeded by Gaius Sulpicius Longus and Publius Aelius Paetus
Preceded by Aulus Cornelius Cossus Arvina	Dictator of the Roman Republic; 320 BC	Succeeded by Lucius Cornelius Lentulus
Preceded by Quintus Fabius Maximus Rullianus	Dictator of the Roman Republic; 314 BC	Succeeded by Gaius Poetelius Libo Visolus
