= Pedum =

Ancient town in Italy

Coordinates: 41°52′52″N 12°47′43″E

Pedum (Ancient Greek: Πέδα) was an ancient town of Latium in central Italy, located between Tibur and Praeneste, near modern Gallicano nel Lazio. The town was a member of the Latin League.

== History ==
Around 488 BC, Pedum was captured by an invading army of the Volsci, led by Gaius Marcius Coriolanus and Attius Tullus Aufidius. In 358 BC, the area around Pedum was occupied by Gauls, who were subsequently defeated by Gaius Sulpicius Peticus. In 339 BC, a combined force from the Latin cities of Tibur, Praeneste, Velitrae, Antium, Aricia, and Lanuvium assembled at Pedum. Tiberius Aemilius Mamercus, who was consul at the time, was dispatched to confront this force, but eventually abandoned the effort. During the following year, 338 BC, the consuls Gaius Maenius and Lucius Furius Camillus were sent to finish off the forces at Pedum. While Maenius intercepted the Aricini, Lanuvini, Veliterni, and the Antiate Volsci near the Astura River, Camillus engaged the Tiburtes and Praenestini. Maenius and Camillus regrouped at Pedum and defeated the Latin forces, bringing an end to the Latin War.
