= Spurius Postumius Albinus Caudinus =

Roman senator and general

Spurius Postumius Albinus Caudinus was a politician of Ancient Rome, of patrician rank, of the 4th century BC. He was consul in 334 BC, and invaded, with his colleague Titus Veturius Calvinus, the country of the Sidicini. But on account of the great forces which the enemy had collected, and the report that the Samnites were coming to their assistance, a dictator was appointed, Publius Cornelius Rufinus.

He was censor in 332 BC and magister equitum in 327 BC, when Marcus Claudius Marcellus was appointed to hold the comitia. In 321 BC, he was consul a second time with Titus Veturius Calvinus, and with him marched against the Samnites and their commander Gaius Pontius in the Second Samnite War. Postumius was defeated at the Battle of the Caudine Forks, near Caudium, and obliged to surrender with his whole army, who were sent "under the yoke", a symbolic gesture of submission to the enemy.

As the price of his deliverance and that of the army, he and his colleague and the other commanders swore, in the name of the Republic, to a humiliating peace. Upon returning to Rome, the consuls, because of their disgrace, laid down their office and their senatorship, and proposed that all persons who had sworn to the peace (that is, themselves) should be stripped and bound and handed over to the Samnites by the Fetiales. The historian Livy quotes extensively from Postumius' speech in the Roman Senate on this matter. The proposal was accepted, and Postumius and the other prisoners were brought to the Samnites by the fetialis Aulus Cornelius Arvina, but Gaius Pontius refused to accept their surrender, on the grounds that it was being used as an excuse to annul the treaty (unfavorable to Rome) that had concluded the Battle of the Caudine Forks.

== See also ==
- Postumia gens

Preceded by M. Valerius Corvus; M. Atilius Regulus Calenus	Roman consul 334 BC; With: Titus Veturius Calvinus	Succeeded by A. Cornelius Cossus Arvina; Cn. Domitius Calvinus
Preceded by Q. Fabius Maximus Rullianus; L. Fulvius Curvus	Roman consul 321 BC; With: Titus Veturius Calvinus	Succeeded by Q. Publilius Philo; L. Papirius Cursor
