= Decimus Junius Brutus Scaeva (consul 325 BC) =

Decimus Junius Brutus Scaeva was a Roman politician and consul in 325 BC.

== Biography ==
Decimus Junius Brutus Scaeva came from the Roman plebeian Junia gens. His second cognomen Scaeva is only preserved in the work of Titus Livius, but his praenomen Decimus is found in the same place and is not mentioned elsewhere in Livius's work but only by Diodorus as well as in Cassiodorus's chronicle.

Brutus is first mentioned in 339 BC when he held the office of Magister equitum for the dictator Quintus Publilus Philo. Like Brutus, Publilus also belonged to the plebeian class, of whom very few representatives, such as Gaius Marcius Rutilus, had held the dictatorship or the position of Magister equitum up to that point. According to the ancient historian Frederick Münzer, Brutus was one of the most important plebeians of his time.

In 325 BC, Brutus was the first plebeian Junii to assume the office of consul, with Lucius Furius Camillus as his colleague. The previous year, the Second Samnite War had broken out, and the Vestini joined forces with the Samnites. Camillus was supposed to fight the Samnites, but, because of a supposed serious illness, he transferred command to Lucius Papirius Cursor, who had been appointed dictators. Brutus took charge of the war against the Vestini. Brutus was able to capture some otherwise unknown and probably insignificant places such as Cutina and Cingilia. Livius appears to portray the campaign of Brutus as exaggeratedly successful.

In 313 BC, Brutus was probably one of the triumvirs that founded a Roman colony at Saticula in Samnium. His son of the same name was consul in 292 BC together with Quintus Fabius Maximus Gurges.
