= Battle of Pedum (338 BC) =

Battle of the Roman-Latin Wars

- Part of Roman–Latin wars
Date	338 BC
Location	Pedum, Italy
Result	Roman Victory

Belligerents
Roman Republic	Tibur; Praeneste; Antium; Velitrae; Aricia; Lanuvium

Commanders and leaders
Gaius Maenius; Lucius Furius Camillus	

The Battle of Pedum was fought in 338 BC, near Pedum between the Roman Republic and multiple cities in Latium: Tibur, Praeneste, Antium, Aricia, Lanuvium, and Velitrae. The Roman army was led by the consuls Gaius Maenius and Lucius Furius Camillus. The battle resulted in a Roman victory.

== Background ==
The Romans had campaigned against the combined force at Pedum during the previous year, 339 BC, but the attempt was abandoned by Tiberius Aemilius Mamercus after hearing of the victory of his colleague, Quintus Publilius Philo, elsewhere in Latium. This move angered the senate, and the unfinished battle became the highest priority for the next year. Therefore, when Maenius and Camillus were elected as consuls, they were ordered to leave at once for Pedum.

== Battle ==
The forces from Tibur and Praeneste, being the two cities closest to Pedum, had already arrived there, but the forces from Aricia, Lanuvium, and Velitrae had made for the Astura River with the intent of joining the Volscian force from Antium. They were intercepted and routed by Maenius. Meanwhile, Camillus set off for Pedum itself, where he engaged the larger armies of Tibur and Praeneste. Maenius, after having dealt with the armies at the Astura River, came to Pedum in order to assist Camillus, and the two quickly defeated the two remaining armies.

== Aftermath ==
After the victory at Pedum, the consuls spent the rest of their terms campaigning throughout Latium, effectively bringing an end to the Latin War. Upon returning to Rome, they were both rewarded with a triumph, and Equestrian statues in the Roman Forum, a rare honor for that time.

== Sources ==
Livy, Ab Urbe Condita, Book VIII

Smith, William (1857). Dictionary of Greek and Roman Geography, Volume 2. Little, Brown and Company. p. 560.

Venning, Timothy (2011). A Chronology of the Roman Empire. A & C Black. p. 67. ISBN 1441154787.
