= Battle of Imbrinium =

Battle in 325 BC

- Part of the Samnite Wars
Date	325 BC
Location	near Imbrinium, in Samnium
Result	Roman victory

Belligerents
Roman Republic	Samnites

Commanders and leaders
Lucius Papirius Cursor; Quintus Fabius Maximus Rullianus	Unknown

Casualties and losses
Unknown	nearly 20,000 killed

The Battle of Imbrinium was fought in 325 BC during the Second Samnite War between the Roman Republic, led by the magister equitum, Quintus Fabius Maximus Rullianus (acting without the permission of the dictator Lucius Papirius Cursor) and the Samnites near Imbrinium, a city in Samnium.

== Background ==
In 325 BC, Lucius Papirius Cursor, a distinguished soldier, was appointed dictator for the purpose of continuing the war against the Samnites after the consul Lucius Furius Camillus fell ill that same year. Quintus Fabius Maximus Rullianus was appointed as his magister equitum. The other consul for that year, Decimus Junius Brutus Scaeva, was preoccupied with a campaign against the Vestini.
After consulting with keeper of the sacred chickens, Cursor decided to leave for Rome in order take the auspices before battle, ordering Rullianus to maintain the army's position while he was gone. After reports from his scouts claiming that the Samnites were unprepared for battle, Rullianus decided to go against his orders to not attack while Cursor was away, and he engaged the enemy anyway.

== Battle ==
Rullianus engaged the Samnites near the town of Imbrinium. After many unsuccessful attempts by the cavalry to break the enemy lines, Lucius Cominius, a military tribune, suggested that the cavalrymen remove the bridles from their horses and charge quickly towards the enemy lines. This strategy worked, and the Samnites were thrown into disorder. The Roman infantry advanced on the enemy and routed the entire force, slaying nearly 20,000 men that day alone.

== Aftermath ==
Rullianus's army took many spoils from the battle, but the magister equitum ordered that all of the enemy's arms be burned, likely out of spite for Cursor, who he feared would attempt to take credit for the victory. Rullianus sent a dispatch to the senate, and Cursor was infuriated by the news, claiming that Rullianus had disrespected the traditional office of dictator.

== References and notes ==
=== Bibliography ===
- Montagu, John Drogo (2015). Battles of The Greek and Roman Worlds. Frontline Books. ISBN 9781473896871.
- Livy. Ab Urbe Condita.
- Taylor, Don (2017). Roman Republic at War : a Compendium of Roman Battles from 502 to 31 BC. Pen and Sword. ISBN 978-1-4738-9444-0. OCLC 986030771.
