= Lucius Fulvius Curvus =

Roman senator

Lucius Fulvius Curvus was an aristocrat of the middle Roman Republic and consul prior in 322 BC with Quintus Fabius Maximus Rullianus. He is the first of the gens Fulvia documented in the history of Rome.

According to his filiation, his father and grandfather's names were also Lucius.

Fulvius Curius is said to have been consul the year Tusculum, according to Cicero the home town of the Fulvii, revolted against Rome; on going over to the Romans he was made consul and triumphed over his own countrymen. Some records state that Fulvius and Fabius also warred against the Samnites and triumphed over them. Livy, however, gives the credit to the dictator Aulus Cornelius Cossus Arvina. In 313 BC he was magister equitum to the dictator Lucius Aemilius Mamercinus, who led the siege of Saticula that succeeded after the army drove off an attempt of the Samnites to relieve the city.

Political offices
Preceded by Gaius Sulpicius Longus II; Quintus Aulius Cerretanus	Roman consul 322 BC with Quintus Fabius Maximus Rullianus	Succeeded by Titus Veturius Calvinus II; Spurius Postumius Albinus Caudinus II
