= Gaius Sulpicius Longus =

4th century BC Roman consul and general

Consul
- In office 337 B.C. 323 B.C. 314 B.C.

Dictator
- In office 312 B.C.

Military service
- Conflicts: Second Samnite War (326-304 B.C.), Siege of Sora (314 B.C.)

Gaius Sulpicius Longus was an accomplished general and statesman of the Roman Republic who served as Consul thrice and dictator once during his career, triumphing once over the Samnites and achieving great political success.

== Family ==
Sulpicius was a member of the Patrician gens Sulpicia, a family which had achieved the consular dignity within the first ten years of the Republic's founding, acquiring the office of consul nine times and consular tribune thirteen times since. Sulpicius was a member of the Sulpicii Longii branch of the family, and was the son of Servius Sulpicius Longus and the grandson of Quintus Sulpicius Longus, consular tribune in 390 BC, the year the Gauls sacked Rome.

== First two consulships ==
In 337 BC, Sulpicius was elected to his first consulship with Publius Aelius Paetus as his plebeian colleague. In this year, it came to the attention of the Senate that the Sidicini were attacking a Roman-aligned group, the Aurunci. Upon the Senate's orders, the consuls prepared for war against the Sidicini. However, once news arrived that the Aurunci were forced by the Sidicini to abandon their towns for Suessa, the Senate grew angry at the consuls for their delay in combating this enemy and ordered them to appoint a dictator.

The consuls nominated Gaius Claudius Crassus as dictator. However, soon after his appointment, it was reported by the augurs that the auspices taken for his appointment were flawed, and he was forced to resign. In the remainder of the year two notable events occurred. Firstly, a Vestal virgin was put to death for her immorality, and secondly, a plebeian was elected to the position of Praetor. As he was a patrician, Sulpicius opposed the election of a plebeian into a position previously solely held by patricians. The senate, however, were unwilling to try to prevent a plebeian from entering the more minor position of a Praetor when they had already tried and failed to restrict the plebeians from achieving the higher honor of the consulate, and thus affirmed the election.

In 323 BC, Sulpicius served a second term as consul alongside Quintus Aulius Cerretanus. In this year, the Second Samnite War continued and Rome was also attacked by the Apulians, with the senate assigning Sulpicius to the former campaign and Aulius to the latter. Sulpicius marched his army into Samnite territory and ravaged it, but did not encounter the Samnite army. Aulius met the same situation in Apulia, and thus there was no great victory that year.

== Third consulship ==
In 314 BC, Sulpicius was elected consul for a third and final time, serving alongside Marcus Poetelius Libo. In this year, the consuls continued the siege of the Samnite aligned city of Sora from the previous year. At first the siege seemed like it would be an extended affair. This changed when a deserter from Sora proposed a plan to the consuls to take the city by trickery. Upon having his strategy approved by the consuls, the deserter sprung his plan into action, taking several cohorts of men at night to take cover in the woods, and stationing ten men on the Soran citadel to hold a narrow and rough pass against enemy attack. He then entered the city and made a ruckus, claiming that the citadel had been taken by the enemy and urgent help was needed. This caused a great panic upon the people of Sora, many of whom began to flee the city thinking all was lost, at which point the hidden Roman soldiers swooped in through an open gate, butchering the fleeing townsfolk and taking the city. By early dawn, Sulpicius and Poetelius entered the now taken city, received the surrender of those in it who survived, and set up a Roman garrison in it.

Next, the consuls turned to combat the Auruncian cities of Ausona, Minturnae, and Vescia, who had recently betrayed Rome to ally with the Samnites. Upon hearing of this impending attack, a dozen young noblemen from the three Auruncian cities defected to the Romans, and upon their arrival advised the consuls to move the Roman encampment closer to the enemy settlements, and to station two groups of soldiers outside each city, one group wearing armor and another group wearing civilian clothing. From there, the men wearing civilian clothing would kill the sentinels of the city with hidden knives, and the troops in armor would charge in and take the city by storm. In all three cities this plan played out perfectly, and within an hour the Auruncian rebellion was put down, with all three rebellious cities being brutally sacked in retribution.

Later that year, a conspiracy was formulated in the previously Roman-aligned city of Capua to revolt against Roman domination, news of which piqued the interest of the Samnites, who intended to attack Capua while they were distracted and no longer under Roman protection. The Samnites set camp at the town of Caudium in order to strike if the situation presented itself. However, the conspiracy was discovered by Rome and the leaders of it were dealt with by a specially appointed dictator, after which the consuls moved to defeat the Samnite force that was posturing to attack a now reconciled ally of Rome.

Upon meeting the Samnites, the Roman and Samnite armies were separated by the Caudine forks, meaning that neither were willing to commit to an assault, instead preferring to skirmish against the other side until that side broke. After many days of skirmishing, it was the Samnites decided to commit to an all out attack against the Romans, as they feared that if they did not, their strength would be steadily sapped away by Roman skirmishing before they could get a chance to fight a decisive battle. Upon seeing the Samnites getting into formation, the consuls prepared their own men for battle, with Sulpicius taking command of the right flank and Poetelius presiding over the left.

The first action of the battle was undertaken by Poetelius. He commanded his infantry to advance on the Samnite infantry, who were easily repelled, but were aided by the Samnite cavalry, which provoked the Roman cavalry to charge into the fray. Combat had not yet started on the right wing, so Sulpicius instead rode to the left wing to encourage the soldiers fighting there to maintain their vigor. Soon enough, the Samnites on the left flank were put to flight and Sulpicius returned to his own side of the army. When he arrived, he found that the right had not fared well in his absence, as the Samnites had just charged and the Romans were beginning to rout. However, when the men on the right flank saw their commander return, their morale was rejuvenated and they turned the tide against the Samnites, routing them instead. Overall, this battle was a great Roman success, with around thirty thousand Samnites killed or captured. After this victory, Sulpicius and Poetelius lay siege to the Samnite city of Bovianum before their terms expired and their command was transferred to a dictator appointed by the next year's consuls. Upon returning to Rome, Sulpicius celebrated a Triumph for his victory over the Samnites, which he celebrated on the Kalends of Quintillus (first of July).

== Dictatorship ==
In 312 BC, as the war in Samnium seemed to come to an end, rumors started spreading of a potential invasion of Roman territory by the Etruscans, in collaboration with the Samnites. As one of the consuls was campaigning in Samnium at the time and the other was too ill to lead a campaign, so the senate ordered the ill consul to appoint a dictator. The man that the consul appointed was Sulpicius. Sulpicius then himself appointed Gaius Junius Bubulcus Brutus as his magister equitum and conducted the levy with great vigor, as the Etruscans were a greatly feared enemy. Because the purpose of his appointment was to defend Roman territory, Sulpicius resolved not to start a campaign unless the Etruscans made the first move. However, since the Etruscans were of the same mindset, no action was undertaken before Sulpicius' resignation from the position of dictator. This is the final known mention of Sulpicius in recorded history.

Political offices
Preceded by Lucius Furius Camillus; Gaius Maenius	Roman consul 337 BC; With: Publius Aelius Paetus	Succeeded by Lucius Papirius Crassus; Caeso Duilius
Preceded by Lucius Furius Camillus II; D. Junius Brutus Scaeva	Roman consul II; 323 BC; With: Quintus Aulius Cerretanus	Succeeded by Q. Fabius Maximus Rullianus; Lucius Fulvius Curvus
Preceded by Lucius Papirius Cursor IV; Quintus Publilius Philo IV	Roman consul III; 313 BC; With: Marcus Poetelius Libo	Succeeded by M. Valerius Maximus Corvinus; Publius Decius Mus
