= Ofilius Calavius =

4th-century BC Campanian nobleman

Ofilius Calavius Ovi f. was a Campanian nobleman during the Second Samnite War. Following the disaster of the Caudine Forks, where both Roman consuls were obliged to surrender their army and pass under the yoke, opinions in Campania were divided as to whether the defeat would forever halt the progress of Roman arms down the Italian Peninsula.

The Samnites were of the opinion that their victory would ensure a permanent peace with the Romans; and indeed, peace did hold from the time of the surrender in 321 until 316 BC. Calavius, one of the most distinguished men of Capua, the greatest city of Campania, witnessed the grim procession of the defeated Romans, who were escorted to the borders of the country and allowed to return home with their lives. Calavius' attitude was less sanguine; he realized that the humiliation of their defeat foreshadowed the eventual return of Roman arms, and grim days ahead for the people of Campania.

Calavius' suspicions proved to be correct; hostilities resumed in 316 BC, and despite some early setbacks, and the intervention of the Etruscans in 311, the Romans persevered, and the Samnites sued for peace in 304, bringing the war to an end. The city of Capua retained its independence, but became a Roman ally.

== Family ==
The Calavii were a leading family in Campania for generations. Calavius (whom some manuscripts call by the Latin praenomen Aulus, instead of the Oscan praenomen Ofilius), was the son of Ovius Calavius, and apparently father of the brothers Ovius and Novius Calavius, who in 314 BC headed a conspiracy to mount an insurgency against the Romans.

A century later, during the Second Punic War, Pacuvius Calavius held the chief magistracy at Capua, and by a clever stratagem, prevented the Capuan senate from surrendering the city to Hannibal. Although the city eventually capitulated to the Carthaginian general, Calavius became his honored guest. When his son disclosed a plan to assassinate Hannibal, Calavius was able to dissuade him from this rash deed.

Some of the Calavii were subsequently held responsible for a series of fires set at Rome in 211 BC, supposedly set in revenge for the treatment of Campania by the Romans.

== See also ==
- Calavia (gens)
