= Ninnia gens =

The gens Ninnia was a plebeian family at Rome. Members of this gens are first mentioned at Capua during the Second Punic War, and are found at Rome towards the end of the Republic. Several Ninnii held the consulship under the Flavian and Antonine emperors.

== Origin ==
The Ninnii appear to have been of Campanian origin. Two brothers of this family hosted Hannibal when he entered the city of Capua in 216 BC, in the aftermath of the Battle of Cannae. Livy identifies them as members of the noble Capuan house of the Ninnii Celeres.

== Praenomina ==
The Ninnii Celeres used the Oscan praenomina Sthenius and Pacuvius. A branch of the family at Rome in the first century BC used the Latin praenomen Lucius. In imperial times we find Gaius and Quintus.

== Branches and cognomina ==
Two cognomina of the gens are known from Republican times: Celer, which means "swift", belonged to a family of the Ninnii at Capua during the Second Punic War. The surname Quadratus is found amongst the Ninnii at Rome in the time of Cicero. The consular family of imperial times bore the cognomen Hasta, or the derived Hastianus.

== Members ==
- Sthenius Ninnius Celer, a Capuan nobleman, who hosted Hannibal after he entered the city in 216 BC.
- Pacuvius Ninnius Celer, brother of Sthenius, and also Hannibal's host; he is sometimes confused with Pacuvius Calavius.
- Lucius Ninnius Quadratus, tribune of the plebs in 58 BC, a warm friend of Cicero.
- Ninnius Crassus, said to have translated the Iliad into Latin verse; his name appears in Priscianus, but there is a possibility that it is corrupt.
- Gaius Ninnius Hasta, (Note: Gaius in the Fasti Ostienses, but Quintus in the Fasti Potentini.) consul suffectus ex kal. Mai. in AD 88.
- Quintus Ninnius Hasta, consul in AD 114.
- Quintus Ninnius Hastianus, consul suffectus in the final months of AD 160.

== See also ==
- List of Roman gentes

== Bibliography ==
- Titus Livius (Livy), History of Rome.
- Priscianus Caesariensis (Priscian), Institutiones Grammaticae (Institutes of Grammar).
- Johann Christian Wernsdorf, Poëtae Latini Minores (Minor Latin Poets), Altenburg, Helmstedt (1780–1799).
- Dictionary of Greek and Roman Biography and Mythology, William Smith, ed., Little, Brown and Company, Boston (1849).
- Theodor Mommsen et alii, Corpus Inscriptionum Latinarum (The Body of Latin Inscriptions, abbreviated CIL), Berlin-Brandenburgische Akademie der Wissenschaften (1853–present).
- René Cagnat et alii, L'Année épigraphique (The Year in Epigraphy, abbreviated AE), Presses Universitaires de France (1888–present).
