= Calavia gens =

Ancient Roman family

The gens Calavia was a distinguished Campanian family of Roman times. Several members of this gens were involved in the events of the Samnite Wars and during the Second Punic War. The most famous of its members was undoubtedly Pacuvius Calavius, the chief magistrate of Capua during Hannibal's invasion of Italy, and son-in-law of Publius Claudius Pulcher.

When Calavius feared that the Capuans would massacre their own senators and surrender the city to Hannibal, he shut them in the senate-house until he convinced the citizens to place their trust in their leaders once more. When Hannibal nevertheless entered Capua following the Battle of Cannae in 216 BC, Calavius restrained his son from a rash attempt on the general's life. In revenge for the subsequent ill treatment of Campania by Rome, a family of this name joined with other Campanians in setting fire to various parts of Rome in 211 BC.

== Origin ==
The Calavii were Campanians, and their native language was Oscan. The early members of the gens all bore Oscan praenomina, and were prominent in the events of southern Italy during the third and fourth centuries BC.

== Praenomina ==
The Calavii are known to have used the Oscan praenomina Ovius, Ofilius, Novius, and Pacuvius. It is not certain whether Perolla, a name assigned to the son of Pacuvius Calavius, was also an Oscan praenomen.

== Branches and cognomina ==
None of the Calavii during the Republic bore any surname. In imperial times we find the cognomen Sabinus, referring to one of the Sabines, or their culture. The Samnites, in whose history the Calavii occur, claimed to be descendants of the Sabines, and the use of Sabinus by the later Calavii probably alluded to this tradition.

== Members of the gens ==
This list includes abbreviated praenomina. For an explanation of this practice, see filiation.

- Ovius Calavius, father of Ofilius Calavius.
- Ofilius Calavius Ovi. f., a man of great distinction at Capua, urged his countrymen not to exult too greatly over the Samnite victory over the Romans at the Caudine Forks, in 321 BC.
- Ovius Calavius Ofili f. Ovi n., with his brother, Novius, was one of the leaders of a conspiracy to launch an insurgency against Rome from Capua in 314 BC.
- Novius Calavius Ofili f. Ovi n., with his brother, one of the leaders of the conspiracy at Capua in 314 BC.
- Pacuvius Calavius, the chief magistrate of Capua during Hannibal's invasion, prevented the massacre of the Capuan senate.
- Perolla Calavius Pacuvi f., the son of Pacuvius Calavius, intended to assassinate Hannibal, but abandoned the design at his father's urging.
- Sthenius Calavius, according to some sources, the brother of Pacuvius Calavius, but his name was probably Sthenius Ninnius Celer.
- Calavius Sabinus, commanded the twelfth legion under Gaius Caesennius Paetus during his campaign in Armenia, in AD 62.

== See also ==
- List of Roman gentes

== Bibliography ==
- Titus Livius (Livy), History of Rome.
- Publius Cornelius Tacitus, Annales.
- Dictionary of Greek and Roman Biography and Mythology, William Smith, ed., Little, Brown and Company, Boston (1849).
- George Davis Chase, "The Origin of Roman Praenomina", in Harvard Studies in Classical Philology, vol. VIII (1897).
