= Marcus Foslius Flaccinator (consul 318 BC) =

Marcus Foslius Flaccinator was a Roman politician who served as Magister Equitum two or perhaps three times, and as Roman consul once in the late 4th century BC. Foslius was a member of the gens Foslia, which despite being of Patrician stock was fairly irrelevant. Indeed, previous to this Foslius, no member of the Foslii ever held the consulship and the family only had one recorded magistracy, that being of Consular Tribune, which was held by another Marcus Foslius Flaccinator in 433 BC. The consul Marcus Foslius Flaccinator was the son of a Gaius Foslius and grandson of Marcus Foslius; however nothing is known about these two individuals and their names are only known through fillation.

== Career ==
Foslius first appears in history in 320 BC as the Magister Equitum of Gaius Maenius. The purpose for the appointment of Maenius in this year is unclear and disputed, it may have been in reaction to a conspiracy by the leading men of Capua, and later to investigate the abuses of prominent Roman noblemen, however some sources state that these events took place in 314 BC, and that year seems like the more likely year for these events to have occurred.

Two years later, in 318 BC, Foslius was elected consul with Lucius Plautius Venox as his colleague. The year was relatively quiet and no military campaign was held. In this year, envoys from several Samnite tribes arrived in Rome, requesting the senate to agree to peace. The senate were initially sympathetic to their entreaties, but the people were not enthralled with peace with the Samnites. Instead of a full peace, a compromise was reached in the form of a truce for two years.

In 314 BC he served as Magister Equitum for a second time, again under Gaius Maenius as Dictator. Maenius was appointed in reaction to the discovery of a conspiracy amongst the nobles of Capua against Rome, led by the two brothers Ovius and Novius Calavius. However as Maenius and Foslius were about to commence the investigation into the conspiracy, Ovius and Novius Calavius both took their own lives, likely due to the consequences of inevitably being found guilty by the Romans. After the death of the Calavii, Maenius retained his position of dictator alongside Foslius, and using the pretense of uprooting conspiracies against the state, the two began to investigate corruption among the Roman elites. Having their secrets exposed caused great anger among the elites who were impeached for corruption, and caused much panic among the ones who were not as they were fearful that their own criminal acts would be exposed next. As a result, they pressed charges against Maenius and Foslius of the very crime that many among them had been accused. In reaction to this accusation, both Maenius and Foslius resigned from their positions so that they might be tried and found innocent as private citizens, thus clearing their names, rather than hide from trial behind their offices. Almost as soon as the two resigned did the trial occur, and despite the testimony of the nobles accused by them, both were acquitted.

In 313 BC, Foslius may have served as Magister Equitum for an unprecedented third time, this time serving under Gaius Poetelius Libo Visolus. In the dictatorship of Poetelius, he recaptured the city of Fregellae and took Nola, however Foslius is not mentioned as taking part in these events, meaning that he either served as an entirely subordinate officer on campaign or he remained in Rome to handle civil affairs. This third term as Magister Equitum however is disputed, because while he is recorded as being Magister Equitum by Livy, the Fasti Capitolini instead refers to Marcus Poetelius Libo as holding the office in this year. Since Quintus Fabius Maximus Rullianus was also recorded as being dictator this year by Diodorus Siculus, the classicist Broughton attempts to reconcile the two traditions by conjecturing that there were two dictators appointed that year simultaneously, one for religious purposes and the other for military activity, which would mean that both sets of dictators and Magistri Equitum were correct.

== Bibliography ==
- Livy (Titus Livius), Ab Urbe Condita Libri
- Smith, William, Dictionary of Greek and Roman Biography and Mythology

Political offices
Preceded by Gaius Junius Bubulcus Brutus and Quintus Aemilius Barbula	Consul of the Roman Republic with Lucius Plautius Venox; 318 BC	Succeeded by Lucius Papirius Cursor and Quintus Aulius Cerretanus
