= 311 BC =

311 BC in various calendars
Gregorian calendar	311 BC; CCCXI BC
Ab urbe condita	443
Ancient Egypt era	XXXIII dynasty, 13
Pharaoh	Ptolemy I Soter, 13
Ancient Greek Olympiad (summer)	117th Olympiad, year 2
Assyrian calendar	4440
Balinese saka calendar	N/A
Bengali calendar	−904 – −903
Berber calendar	640
Buddhist calendar	234
Burmese calendar	−948
Byzantine calendar	5198–5199
Chinese calendar	己酉年 (Earth Rooster); 2387 or 2180 — to — 庚戌年 (Metal Dog); 2388 or 2181
Coptic calendar	−594 – −593
Discordian calendar	856
Ethiopian calendar	−318 – −317
Hebrew calendar	3450–3451
- Hindu calendars
Vikram Samvat	−254 – −253
Shaka Samvat	N/A
Kali Yuga	2790–2791
Holocene calendar	9690
Iranian calendar	932 BP – 931 BP
Islamic calendar	961 BH – 960 BH
Javanese calendar	N/A
Julian calendar	N/A
Korean calendar	2023
Minguo calendar	2222 before ROC 民前2222年
Nanakshahi calendar	−1778
Seleucid era	1/2 AG
Thai solar calendar	232–233
Tibetan calendar	阴土鸡年 (female Earth-Rooster) −184 or −565 or −1337 — to — 阳金狗年 (male Iron-Dog) −183 or −564 or −1336

Year 311 BC was a year of the pre-Julian Roman calendar. At the time, it was known as the Year of the Consulship of Brutus and Barbula (or, less frequently, year 443 Ab urbe condita). The denomination 311 BC for this year has been used since the early medieval period, when the Anno Domini calendar era became the prevalent method in Europe for naming years.

== Events ==
=== By place ===
==== Babylonia/Media/Susiana ====
- Upon entering Mesopotamia Seleucus manages to persuade some of the Macedonian veterans settled at Carrhae to join his cause. He then marches on to his old satrapy (province) of Babylonia gathering additional force along the way.
- Seleucus manages to persuade Polyarchus, the Antigonid commander of one of the local districts, to join his cause. Polyarchus joins Seleucus with 1,000 soldiers.
- The remaining Antigonid loyalists in Babylonia retreat to the citadel of Babylon. They also put Seleucus' remaining friends in Babylon there (under a strong guard). Seleucus besieges the citadel and manages to take it by storm.
- Nicanor, Antigonus' commander of the Upper Satrapies, marches against Seleucus from Media (where he was stationed) with 10,000 infantry and 7,000 cavalry. Seleucus hides his much smaller army (3,000 infantry and 400 cavalry) along Nicanor's line of march and launches a night attack on his camp, catching his opponent by surprise; Nicanor flees the ensuing battle while his army quickly surrenders.
- Seleucus marches to eastern Susiana and negotiates a treaty with the Cossaei (a warlike tribe) in the mountains between Susiana and Media.
- Seleucus reestablishes himself as satrap of Babylonia and asserts control over Media and Susiana (Elam).

==== Asia Minor/Syria/Palestina ====
- Ptolemy tries to occupy Syria; he himself campaigns in Coele Syria (southern Syria) while he sends Killes, one of his generals, into northern Syria to finish off the remnants of Demetrius Poliorcetes' army. Demetrius defeats Killes at Myus and Antigonus enters Syria in force. So, after only a few months, Ptolemy evacuates his forces from Syria.
- In view of the threat by Seleucus to his control of the East, Antigonus decides to make peace with all of his adversaries, except Seleucus, who now holds Babylon. All of the diadochi confirm the existing boundaries and the freedom of the Greek cities. Ptolemy and Lysimachus are confirmed as satraps of Egypt and Thrace, respectively, and Antigonus and Cassander are confirmed as commanders of the army in Asia and Europe. Antigonus, no longer regent but now titled the strategos (officer in charge) of the whole of Asia, rules in Syria from the Hellespont to the Euphrates, including Asia Minor.
- It is agreed by all parties that the young king Alexander IV of Macedon, son of Alexander the Great, will become king of the whole empire when he comes of age in six years' time.
- The peace agreement between the diadochi is soon violated. On the pretext that garrisons have been placed in some of the free Greek cities by Antigonus. Ptolemy and Cassander renew hostilities against him.
- Antigonus sends one of his generals, Athenaeus, with 4,000 light infantry and 600 cavalry to make a raid on Petra, the capital city of the Nabateans, to carry off hostages and possessions. The raid is initially successful, but a surprise attack by the Nabateans destroys Athenaeus' raiding force, only 50 horsemen escaping.
- Through clever diplomacy Antigonus is able to lull the Nabateans into a false sense of security. Demetrius, with a force of 4,000 light infantry and 4,000 cavalry, is sent to make another raid on Petra. The Nabateans, reacting quickly, are able to foil the attack. Demetrius negotiates terms with the Nabateans and returns to his father with hostages and gifts (including 700 camels)

==== Greece ====
- During the winter of 312/11 Antigonus' nephew Telesphorus, who had been subordinated to Antigonus' other nephew Ptolemy in 312, decides to rebel, considering his subordination to be insulting. Ptolemy is able to keep the situation under control and persuades Telesphorus to return to the fold.
- Cassander opens up negotiations with Ptolemy.

==== Italy ====
- The Second Samnite War continues, the Roman consuls Gaius Junius Bubulcus Brutus and Quintus Aemilius Barbula divide their command.

- Barbula campaigns against the Etruscans.
- Brutus campaigns against the Samnites.

- The Samnites take the Roman garrison of Cluviae and scourge their prisoners. Junius liberates the city and then moves on Bovianum and sacks it. The Samnites try to ambush the Romans, but the Romans are able to overcome their assailants.
- The Etruscans are besieging Sutrium, an ally which the Romans see as their key to Etruria. Barbula marches to their aid, and a battle is fought; the Romans start to gain the upper hand, but darkness stops the battle. Barbula's campaign ends indecisive.

==== Sicily ====
- The Carthaginian general Hamilcar crosses the Mediterranean with an army and wins the Battle of Himera against Agathocles, the tyrant of Syracuse.
- Hamilcar then proceeds with laying siege to Syracuse, where Agathocles had retreated.
