= Aulia gens =

Roman gens

The gens Aulia was a Roman family during the period of the Republic. The gens was probably plebeian, but only a few members are known to history. The most illustrious of the family was Quintus Aulius Cerretanus, who obtained the consulship twice, in 323 and 319 BC, during the Second Samnite War.

== Origin ==
The nomen Aulius is a patronymic surname, derived from the praenomen Aulus, just as Sextius was derived from Sextus, Marcius from Marcus, and Quinctius from Quintus. Although there were Aulii at Rome in the fourth century BC, the gens may have been spread throughout Latium, as one of them was prefect of the allies during the Second Punic War. The surname Cerretanus may point to an Etruscan origin, and at least some scholars believe that the praenomen Aulus is itself Etruscan, although in historical times the name was among the most common of Roman praenomina.

== Praenomina ==
The most famous member of the Aulii bore the praenomen Quintus, as did his father and grandfather. However, the 315 BC entry in the Fasti Capitolini for the consular Aulius preserves the enigmatic filiation "Ai. n.", which meaning has not been explained, as no known praenomen can be shortened as such. Attilio Degrassi, Robert Broughton and others have therefore considered that there were two homonymous men with a different grandfather active at the end of the fourth century BC. Stephen Oakley nevertheless writes that this unique occurrence is a proof of the praenomen's authenticity, and that there was only one Aulius at the time.

A later Aulius was named Manius.

== Branches and cognomina ==
The only cognomen associated with any of the Aulii is Cerretanus. This surname seems to belong to a class of names derived from various peoples, in this case a tribe known as the Cerretani; but the only Cerretani known from historical times were an Iberian tribe. In this instance, Cerretanus seems more likely to be an orthographic variant of Caeretanus, referring to an inhabitant of the Etruscan city of Caere, or perhaps someone who had lived along the river Caeretanus, the modern Vaccina, which flows into the Tyrrhenian Sea below Caere.

== Members ==
This list includes abbreviated praenomina. For an explanation of this practice, see filiation.

- Quintus Aulius, grandfather of the consul of 323 and 319 BC.
- Quintus Aulius Q. f., father of the consul of 323 and 319 BC.
- Quintus Aulius Q. f. Q. n. (or Ai. n) Cerretanus, consul in 323 and 319 BC, during the Second Samnite War. He triumphed over the Frentani in the latter year, and in 315 was magister equitum to the dictator Quintus Fabius Maximus Rullianus. Engaging the enemy without first obtaining the dictator's permission, he slew the Samnite general, before falling in battle.
- Manius Aulius, prefect of the allied soldiers under the command of Marcus Claudius Marcellus in 208 BC, during the Second Punic War, was slain in the battle against Hannibal.

== See also ==
- List of Roman gentes

== Bibliography ==
- Diodorus Siculus, Bibliotheca Historica (Library of History).
- Titus Livius (Livy), History of Rome.
- Dictionary of Greek and Roman Biography and Mythology, William Smith, ed., Little, Brown and Company, Boston (1849).
- George Davis Chase, "The Origin of Roman Praenomina", in Harvard Studies in Classical Philology, vol. VIII (1897).
- T. Robert S. Broughton, The Magistrates of the Roman Republic, American Philological Association (1952).
- Attilio Degrassi, Fasti Capitolini recensuit, praefatus est, indicibus instruxit, Turin, 1954.
- Stephen P. Oakley, A Commentary on Livy: Books VI–X, Volume II, Books VI-VIII, Oxford University Press, 1998.
