= Aulus Cornelius Arvina =

Ancient Roman priest

Aulus Cornelius Arvina was a fetialis (or priest) of ancient Rome who lived in the 4th century BCE.

He was sent to restore to the Samnites the prisoners who had been set free by them after the Battle of the Caudine Forks in 321 BCE, including the general Spurius Postumius Albinus Caudinus and his forces.
