= Titus Veturius Calvinus =

4th century BC Roman general and statesman

Titus Veturius Calvinus was a Roman statesman, who held the consulship in 334 and 321 BC, the latter year during the Second Samnite War.

As consul in 321, Calvinus and the other consul, Spurius Postumius Albinus, were defeated by the Samnites at the Battle of the Caudine Forks where they were cornered in a mountain pass and forced to surrender, after which their army was forced to "march under the yoke," a symbolic gesture of submission to an enemy. After returning to Rome, Postumius suggested that the consuls be handed over to the Samnites for having made a disgraceful peace with them, but the Samnites rejected this offer.

== See also ==
- Veturia gens

Preceded by Marcus Atilius Regulus Calenus and Marcus Valerius Corvus	Consul of the Roman Republic with Spurius Postumius Albinus; 334 BC	Succeeded by Dictator Publius Cornelius Rufinus
Preceded by Fabius Maximus Rullianus and Lucius Fulvius Curvus	Consul of the Roman Republic with Spurius Postumius Albinus II; 321 BC	Succeeded by Lucius Papirius Cursor and Quintus Publilius Philo
