= Ninnius Crassus =

Ninnius Crassus was a Roman writer who translated the Greek Iliad into Latin hexameters. Nothing about his life is known. He may have lived in the early 1st century BC. Only one and a half lines of Ninnius' translation are extant. They are:

- socii, nunc fite uiri, quoted by Nonius Marcellus
- man non<dum> coniui oculos ego deinde sopore, quoted by Priscian

According to Reinhold Glei, commenting on the quality of the poetry, "the loss of the poem is perhaps not a very painful one".

== See also ==
- Ninnia gens
