= Temple of Quirinus =

Ancient Roman temple

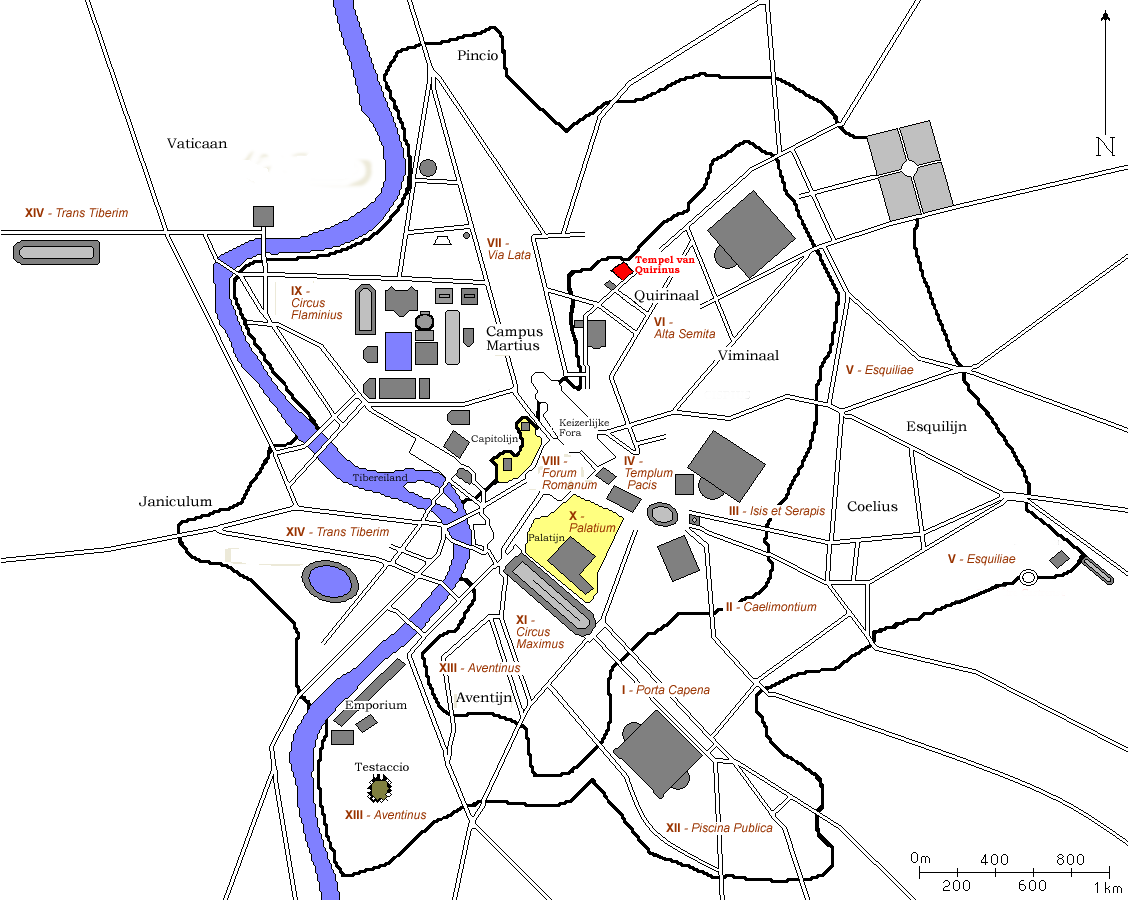
- Plan Rome - Aedes Quirini

- Shown in ancient Rome
- Interactive map of Temple of Quirinus
- 41°54′07″N 12°29′25″E

The Temple of Quirinus (Latin: Aedes Quirini or Templum Quirini) was an ancient Roman temple built on the western half of the Quirinal Hill near the Capitolium Vetus, on a site which now equates to the junction between Via del Quirinale and Via delle Quattro Fontane, beside Piazza Barberini. Domitian later built the Temple of the gens Flavia nearby.

According to ancient authors, the temple of Quirinus was built and dedicated to Quirinus (the deified form of Romulus) by the consul Lucius Papirius Cursor in 293 BC.

Work was done on the temple in the early imperial period, and literary references are found until the 4th century AD.

Fieldwork conducted by Andrea Carandini employed ground penetrating radar on the Quirinal Hill, revealing possible remains of the temple.

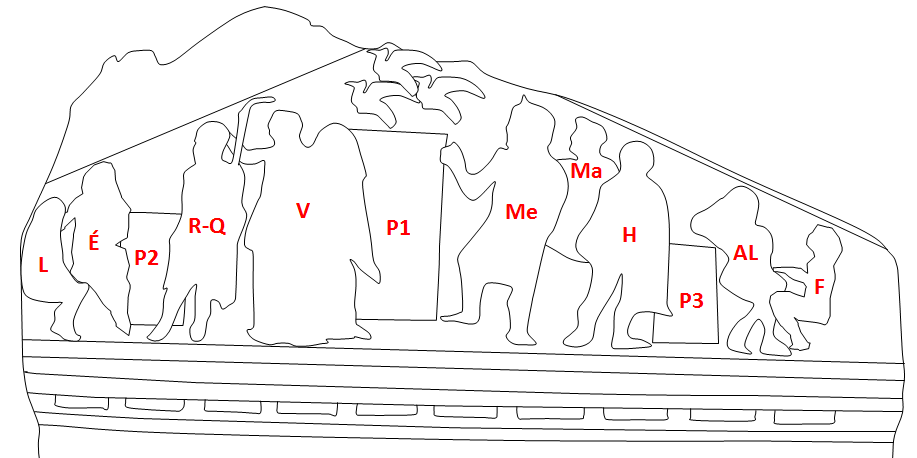
Diagram of the pediment of the temple of Quirinus shown on a fragment of Hartwig's Relief

== See also ==
- List of Ancient Roman temples
