= Quintus Aemilius Barbula =

4th-century BC Roman senator and general

Quintus Aemilius Barbula (fl. 317–311 BC) was consul in 317 BC, in which year a treaty was made with the Apulian Teates, Nerulum was taken by Barbula, and Apulia entirely subdued. (Liv. ix. 20, 21; Diod. xix. 17.) Barbula was consul again in 311, and had the conduct of the war against the Etruscans, with whom he fought an indecisive battle according to Livy. (ix. 30—32; Diod. xx. 3.) The Fasti, however, assign him a triumph over the Etruscans, but Niebuhr (Rom. Hist. iii. p. 278) thinks this to have been an invention of the family, more especially as the next campaign against the Etruscans was not opened as if the Romans had been previously conquerors.

Quintus was the first consul in the Barbula branch of the ancient patrician gens Aemilia, said to have come to Rome in the reign of Numa Pompilius. His son Lucius and grandson Marcus also became consuls.

== Genealogy ==
Lucius Aemilius [Barbula?], father of
1. Quintus Aemilius L.f. [Barbula?], father of
1.1. Quintus Aemilius Q.f. L.n. Barbula, consul 317 BC, 311 BC, father of
1.1.1. Lucius Aemilius Q.f. Q.n. [L.pr.] Barbula, consul 281 BC, triumphed Quinctilius 280 BC; son of the first consul in this stirps. He was apparently father of
1.1.1.1. Marcus Aemilius L.f. Q.n. [Q.pr.] Barbula, consul 230 BC apparently son of the above consul, became consul 50 years after his father's triumph

Political offices
| Preceded by L. Plautius Venno (or Venox); Marcus Foslius Flaccinator | Roman consul with C. Junius Bubulcus Brutus; 317 BC | Succeeded by Spurius Nautius Rutilus; M. Popillius Laenas |
| Preceded by Marcus Valerius Maximus Corvinus; Publius Decius Mus | Roman consul II with C. Junius Bubulcus Brutus II; 311 BC | Succeeded by Q. Fabius Maximus Rullianus; Gaius Marcius Rutilus Censorinus |
