= Publius Cornelius Rufinus (dictator 334 BC) =

Roman Republic dictator in 334 BC

Publius Cornelius Rufinus was a dictator during the Roman Republic.

Rufinus belonged to the famous patrician gens Cornelia, as well as being the earliest recorded member of the branch of the family, the gens Cornelii Rufinii et Sullae.

He was appointed dictator in 334 BC but renounced his position due to a defect in the religious procedures for his appointment. He is then mentioned again the following year in the Fasti Consulares as sole dictator, in the first Dictator Year (a year without consuls). However, the historicity of the Dictator Years is usually rejected by modern historians.

He was an alleged distant patriarchal ancestor of the dictator Lucius Cornelius Sulla.

== Bibliography ==
- Titus Livius (Livy), History of Rome.
- Jörg Rüpke, Anne Glock, David Richardson (translator), Fasti Sacerdotum: A Prosopography of Pagan, Jewish, and Christian Religious Officials in the City of Rome, 300 BC to AD 499, Oxford University Press, 2008.

Political offices
Preceded by Spurius Postumius Albinus and Titus Veturius Calvinus	Dictator of the Roman Republic; 334 BC	Succeeded by Gnaeus Domitius Calvinus and Aulus Cornelius Cossus Arvina
