= Manius Aulius =

Roman officer during the Second Punic War

Manius Aulius was prefect of the Roman allies, or socii, in 208 BC, during the Second Punic War.

While on a reconnaissance mission a small force of 220 horsemen, under the consuls Marcus Claudius Marcellus and Titus Quinctius Crispinus, the troop was ambushed by a much larger Carthaginian force consisting of Numidian cavalry, and nearly everyone—including Aulius and both consuls—was killed.

== See also ==
- Aulia gens

== Bibliography ==
- Titus Livius (Livy), History of Rome.
- Dictionary of Greek and Roman Biography and Mythology, William Smith, ed., Little, Brown and Company, Boston (1849).
- T. Robert S. Broughton, The Magistrates of the Roman Republic, American Philological Association (1952–1986).
