= Ovius and Novius Calavius =

Campanian anti-Roman conspirators

Ovius and Novius Calavius (both died in 314 BC), brothers, were the sons of Ofilius Calavius, a Campanian nobleman during the Second Samnite War (326–304 BC). They conspired to mount an insurrection against the Romans, but when their conspiracy was discovered, and steps taken to prevent their plan from coming to fruition, they killed themselves rather than face arrest.

== Background ==
In 321 BC the Romans had suffered a humiliating defeat at the Caudine Forks, where both consuls were obliged to surrender their army and pass under the yoke. The Romans were escorted to the borders of Campania and allowed to return home with their lives. Ofilius Calavius, father of the two brothers, warned that the sting of their defeat would likely be erased only with the return of Roman arms and the renewal of the war.

After five years' peace, the war was resumed. In 314 BC a number of plots against the Romans were suspected and investigated. These may have been encouraged by the harsh treatment of Luceria, whose inhabitants had given up the Roman garrison to the Samnites.

== The conspiracy ==
At Capua, Ovius and Novius Calavius conspired with other Capuan nobles to mount an insurgency against the Romans. When this plot was discovered and reported to the Roman Senate, the alarm wrought by the potential defection of a nominal ally prompted the appointment of a dictator. Gaius Maenius, who had been consul in 338 BC, was nominated, and as his magister equitum he chose Marcus Foslius Flaccinator. Before the dictator's investigation could begin, and evidence could be given against them, the brothers took their own lives, thereby escaping trial.

== See also ==
- Calavia (gens)
