= Gaius Valerius Potitus =

Roman senator

Gaius Valerius Potitus was consul with M. Claudius Marcellus in 331 BC and was aedile in 329 BC. His father was Gaius Valerius Potitus (Tribuni militum consulari potestate in 370 BC) and his brother was Lucius Valerius Potitus (magister equitum in 331 BC).

During his consulship, Valerius carried out the execution of some 170 women accused of murdering their husbands with poison. They were all convicted on the testimony of one slave girl.

During his term as aedile, Valerius brought Marcus Flavius to trial for adultery. During the trial, Valerius lost his temper and bluntly stated he didn't care whether or not he was ruining an innocent man as long as Flavius was being ruined. Because of this he failed to convict Flavius.

Preceded by Gn. Domitius Calvinus; A. Cornelius Cossus Arvina	Roman consul 331 BC; With: M. Claudius Marcellus	Succeeded by L. Papirius Crassus; L. Plautius Venno
