= Gallicano nel Lazio =

- Comune
- Comune di Gallicano nel Lazio
- Coat of arms

- Location within Italy Location within Lazio
- Coordinates: 41°52′N 12°49′E
- Country: Italy
- Region: Lazio
- Metropolitan city: Rome (RM)

Government
  - Mayor: Fabio Bertoldo

Area
  - Total: 26.0 km^{2} (10.0 sq mi)
- Elevation: 241 m (791 ft)

Population (30 June 2015)
  - Total: 6,341
  - Density: 244/km^{2} (632/sq mi)
- Demonym: Gallicanesi
- Time zone: UTC+1 (CET)
  - Summer (DST): UTC+2 (CEST)
- Postal code: 00010
- Dialing code: 06
- Website: Official website

Gallicano nel Lazio is a comune (municipality) in the Metropolitan City of Rome in the Italian region of Latium, located about 25 kilometres (16 mi) east of Rome at the feet of the Monti Prenestini.

== History ==
In Roman times, it was known as Pedum. A castle is mentioned here in 984 AD, called Castrum Gallicani. Here a Benedictine monastery grew in the following year, later owned by the abbey of San Paolo fuori le Mura. Gallicano from the 13th century it was a possession of the Colonna family, and pope Martin V (a Colonna) sojourned here in 1424.

In 1501 the Borgia conquered it, although it was returned to the Colonna after the death of pope Alexander VI. The castle was destroyed in 1526 and rebuilt four years later. In 1622 the Ludovisi family acquired Gallicano, followed by the Rospigliosi Pallavicini in 1633, who held it until 1839.
