= Marcus Claudius Marcellus (consul 331 BC) =

Marcus Claudius Marcellus was consul in 331 BC with Gaius Valerius Potitus. His son, also named Marcus Claudius Marcellus, was consul in 287 BC.

In 327 BC, consul Lucius Cornelius Lentulus named Claudius dictator for the purpose of holding elections. The augurs were consulted and disapproved, instigating an interregnum which lasted until the 14th interrex, Lucius Aemilius, installed consuls Gaius Poetelius and Lucius Papirius Cursor.

Political offices
Preceded by Gn. Domitius Calvinus; A. Cornelius Cossus Arvina	Consul of the Roman Republic with G. Valerius Potitus; 331 BC	Succeeded by L. Papirius Crassus; L. Plautius Venox
