= Aulus Cornelius Cossus Arvina =

Fourth-century BC Roman consul and dictator

Aulus Cornelius Cossus Arvina was a Roman statesman and general who served as both consul and Magister Equitum twice, and Dictator in 322 BC.

== Family ==
Cossus was a member of the patrician gens Cornelia. The Cornelii were one of the most important families of the Roman Republic, first attaining the consulship in 485 BC, and remaining prominent throughout the next four hundred years, producing figures such as Scipio Africanus and Sulla. Cossus was the son of Publius and grandson of Aulus, and was a descendant of the Aulus Cornelius Cossus who as consul in 428 BC slew Lars Tolumnius, the King of Veii, to obtain the spolia opima. Publius Cornelius Arvina, consul in 306 and 288 BC, was probably his son.

== Career ==
=== Magister equitum ===
Cossus first appears in history in 353 BC as magister equitum serving under the dictator Titus Manlius Torquatus. Manlius was appointed to make war on Caere, an Etruscan city that had recently made common cause with Tarquinii against Rome. The Caerites sued for peace, and were granted a hundred-year truce. Manlius then turned against the Falisci, who had also allied themselves with the Etruscans, but unable to locate the Faliscan army, he instead ravaged the territory of their chief city, Falerii. Apart from serving as Manlius' lieutenant, nothing is known of the role that Cossus played in these events.

Cossus was nominated magister equitum for a second time in 349 BC, again serving under Torquatus, appointed dictator to hold the consular elections. These elections were notable because the young Marcus Valerius Corvus, a military tribune in 349, was elected consul for the first time, owing in part to his heroics in battle against the Gauls. Cossus would later serve alongside Corvus during his first consulship.

=== Consulships ===
Cossus and Corvus were consuls together in 343, the year that the First Samnite War arose out of a dispute over the city of Capua. The senate directed Corvus to defend Capua, while Cossus was ordered to march against the Samnites. The campaign started badly, as Cossus unwisely marched his army into a ravine, where he was surrounded by Samnites, and unable to retreat. He was saved by the military tribune Publius Decius Mus, who attacked and distracted the Samnites, allowing Cossus to escape with the bulk of his army. Decius and his men overcame the Samnites, who retreated. Cossus and Decius then routed the remainder of the Samnite army with their combined forces. Cossus was granted a triumph by the senate, as was Corvus, who had defeated the Samnites in two other battles.

Cossus was elected consul a second time for the year 332 BC, serving with Gnaeus Domitius Calvinus. His election was secured with the aid of Marcus Valerius Corvus, his former consular partner, who was serving as interrex. In this year a treaty was made with Alexander of Epirus, who had come to the aid of the cities of Magna Graecia against the Samnites. There was also a rumor of a Gallic invasion, leading to the nomination of Marcus Papirius Crassus as dictator. However, when no invasion materialized, Crassus resigned his office.

=== Dictatorship ===
In 322 BC, in the midst of the Second Samnite War, Cossus was nominated dictator to fight the Samnites, who were rumored to have strengthened their armies with a large number of mercenaries. Cossus appointed Marcus Fabius Ambustus as his magister equitum, and they met the Samnite army soon after entering enemy territory. Cossus decided to withdraw to more favourable ground, but his retreat was cut off by the Samnite cavalry. Cossus attempted to fortify his position before the Samnite infantry could arrive, but his efforts were thwarted by the enemy, and he was forced into battle. After five hours of fighting, neither side had a clear advantage. But when some of the Samnites broke off to attack the Roman supply train, Cossus sent Fabius to drive off the looters. His success cheered the Romans, and demoralized the Samnites. The Roman infantry pressed their attack, joined by the cavalry, and soon routed the Samnites. For this victory, the Senate awarded Cossus a second triumph.

The Roman historian Livy reports an alternative tradition, in which Cossus was named dictator to oversee the Ludi Romani in place of the praetor, Lucius Plautius, who was unable to do so due to illness. In this account, the consuls Quintus Fabius Maximus Rullianus and Lucius Fulvius Curvus defeated the Samnites.

=== Emissary to the Samnites ===
The next year, the consuls Spurius Postumius Albinus and Titus Veturius Calvinus were caught in an ambush at the Battle of the Caudine Forks, and their armies were made to pass under the yoke, as well as agreeing to a treaty. The senate refused to ratify the treaty, and the consuls abdicated. The following year, Postumius and his colleague surrendered themselves to the Samnites as punishment for breaking the treaty they had negotiated. The senate appointed Cossus a fetial, a type of priest who ritually presided over foreign treaties and affairs, to escort the ex-consuls to their fate. However, Gaius Pontius, the Samnite commander who had defeated the consular army, refused to accept the men, judging that to take or put them to death would give the Romans cause to pursue the war with renewed vigor. This is the final occasion that Cossus is mentioned in history.

== Bibliography ==
- Marcus Tullius Cicero, Cato Maior de Senectute; De Officiis.
- Diodorus Siculus, Bibliotheca Historica (Library of History).
- Dionysius of Halicarnassus, Romaike Archaiologia (Roman Antiquities).
- Titus Livius (Livy), History of Rome.
- Appianus Alexandrinus (Appian), Bellum Samniticum (History of the Samnite War).
- Dictionary of Greek and Roman Biography and Mythology, William Smith, ed., Little, Brown and Company, Boston (1849).
- T. Robert S. Broughton, The Magistrates of the Roman Republic, American Philological Association (1952–1986).
- George J. Szemler, The Priests of the Roman Republic: A Study of Interactions Between Priesthoods and Magistracies, Latomus (1972).
- Stephen P. Oakley, A Commentary on Livy, Books VI–X, Oxford University Press (1997).

Political offices
Preceded by Gaius Marcius Rutilus and Titus Manlius Imperiosus Torquatus	Consul of the Roman Republic with Marcus Valerius Corvus; 343 BC	Succeeded by Quintus Servilius Ahala and Gaius Marcius Rutilus
Preceded by Publius Cornelius Rufinus as Roman Dictator	Consul of the Roman Republic with Gnaeus Domitius Calvinus; 332 BC	Succeeded by Marcus Claudius Marcellus and Gaius Valerius Potitus
