= Gaius Junius Bubulcus Brutus =

4th century BC Roman statesman and general

Gaius Junius Bubulcus Brutus (fl. late 4th century BC) was a Roman general and statesman, he was elected consul of the Roman Republic thrice, he was also appointed dictator or magister equitum thrice, and censor in 307 BC. In 311, he made a vow to the goddess Salus that he went on to fulfill, becoming the first plebeian to build a temple. The temple was one of the first dedicated to an abstract deity, and Junius was one of the first generals to vow a temple and then oversee its establishment through the construction and dedication process.

The desultory manner in which Junius Bubulcus survives in the historical record obscures the stature indicated by the number of high offices he held from 317 to 302 BC; it has been observed that he "cannot have been as colourless as he appears in Livy."

== Political and military career ==
Junius was consul in 317 BC with the patrician Quintus Aemilius Barbula. The two were joint consuls again in 311. From the mid-4th century to the early 3rd century BC, several plebeian-patrician "tickets" repeated joint terms, suggesting a deliberate political strategy of cooperation. The Second Samnite War was a formative time in the creation of a ruling elite (the nobiles) that comprised both patricians and plebeians who had risen to power. As consul, Junius exerted force in central Italy to restore Roman control over the Vestini.

In 313 BC, as consul with Lucius Papirius Cursor who was in his fifth term, Junius is credited with the capture of Nola, Atina, and Calatia by some sources. The following year, he was appointed either dictator or magister equitum, and was sent with troops to the Marrucini, with some success.

In 311, Junius held command in Samnium. The Augustan historian Livy says that allied Etruscans attacked the colony of Sutrium, an exposed outpost, and Junius fought a battle that ended with nightfall rather than resolution. The outcome of the campaign seems ambiguous: "The sum total of his achievement apparently was to sack some otherwise unknown hamlets, Talium, Cataracta, and Ceraunilia." According to Livy, Junius regained Cluviae and captured Bovianum, a town of the Pentri, but this may be the propaganda of his gens. Diodorus gives a more laudatory report of Roman actions, while Zonaras gives a less favorable ending. The varying assessments of Roman success may indicate a slim and costly victory. Whatever the scale of his victories, Junius celebrated a triumph which featured praeda pecorum, booty in the form of cattle.

During a Samnite ambush, Junius had prayed to Jupiter and Mars, but made a vow to the goddess Salus, presumably for a narrow escape in battle. Salus was the divine embodiment of health, welfare, safety, and salvation both personal and public. This was also a time of plague, and in 313 Poetelius Libo Visolus had been appointed dictator clavi figendi causa, that is, the dictator appointed to drive a nail, a much-debated ritual intended in this instance to stop the outbreak. Reverence toward Salus's power to grant or withhold her favor as a response to plague may also have occasioned the temple, as Junius put out public contracts for its construction five years after the battle that is supposed to have prompted the vow, when he was censor in 307. As dictator in 302 he oversaw its dedication. The temple housed paintings by Gaius Fabius, a relative of Fabius Rullianus; the cognomen Pictor, or "painter" (see Fabius Pictor) is likely to have been acquired by a branch of the Fabii at this time. Denarii minted by Decimus Junius Silanus in 91 BC picture Salus and may be intended to recall the founding of her temple by his ancestor.

In their second joint consulship, both Junius Bubulcus and Aemilius Barbula refused to recognize the revision of the Roman Senate roll made the previous year by the censors Appius Claudius Caecus and Gaius Plautius Venox.

Junius was magister equitum in 310 and possibly again in 309; his office in the latter year may have been dictator.

As censor in 307 with Marcus Valerius Maximus, he removed Lucius Annius from the senate on moral grounds. Annius had divorced his wife even though she had been a virgin when they married, and had done so without honoring his social obligations by consulting his friends.

Junius was appointed dictator again in 302 BC. Livy's account of this year is somewhat confused. He makes both Junius and Valerius Maximus dictatores, but military campaigns on at least four fronts may account for the multiplicity of appointments. Junius's war against the Aequi is one of a series from 304 to 300 BC. Junius swiftly put down an insurrection that broke out when Alba was colonized, and the Aequi ceased to exist as a separate people at this time. There is a consul in 292 of the same name, this may be him or an unknown son.

Political offices
Preceded by Marcus Folius Flaccinator; Lucius Plautius Venno	Roman consul 317 BC; With: Quintus Aemilius Barbula	Succeeded by Spurius Nautius Rutilus; Marcus Popillius Laenas
Preceded by Marcus Poetelius Libo; Gaius Sulpicius Longus III	Roman consul 313 BC; With: Lucius Papirius Cursor V	Succeeded by M. Valerius Maximus Corvinus; Publius Decius Mus
Preceded by M. Valerius Maximus Corvinus; Publius Decius Mus	Roman consul 311 BC; With: Quintus Aemilius Barbula II	Succeeded by Q. Fabius Maximus Rullianus; C. Marcius Rutilus Censorinus
