= Sthenius and Pacuvius Ninnius Celer =

Capuan Roman brothers in the Second Punic War

Sthenius and Pacuvius Ninnius Celer were brothers, and members of the noble Capuan house of the Ninnii Celeres, during the Second Punic War. Following the Battle of Cannae in 216 BC, Hannibal advanced upon the city of Capua, which opened its gates to him, as defeat otherwise seemed inevitable. There he made his winter quarters, and lodged in the house of the brothers Sthenius and Pacuvius.

Due to ambiguities in some manuscripts of Livius, Pacuvius Ninnius is sometimes confused with Pacuvius Calavius, the chief magistrate of Capua, and for this reason, Sthenius is described as Sthenius Calavius in some sources. As one of the leading men of Capua, Calavius, who had previously worked to prevent the city's capitulation in 217, was invited to a banquet given by Hannibal at the house of his hosts, in an attempt to reconcile his former opponents to his presence and gain their trust.

Also invited was Calavius' son, Perolla, a supporter of Decius Magius, who had opposed Capua's surrender, and been placed in chains by Hannibal. Perolla proposed to murder the Carthaginian general during the banquet, but his father managed to dissuade him from this rash plan.

== See also ==
- Ninnia (gens)
