= Lucius Papirius Cursor =

4th-century BC Roman politician and general

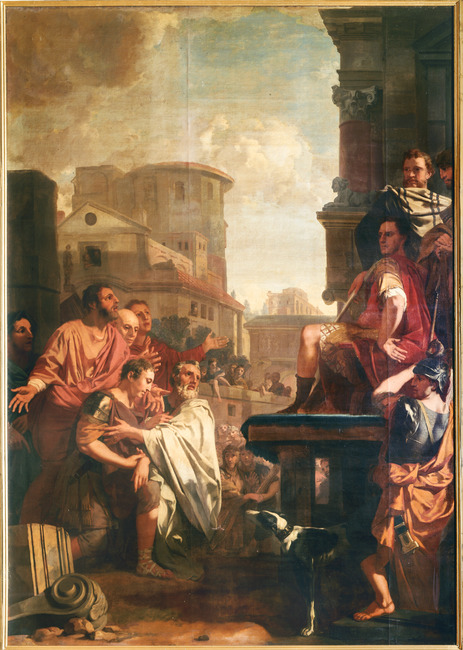
The Clemency of Lucius Papirius Cursor, by Gerard de Lairesse, 1688, depicting his quarrel with Fabius Rullianus.

Lucius Papirius Cursor (c.365–after 310 BC) (Note: This article uses the Varronian chronology, named after the Roman historian Marcus Terentius Varro. In order to solve an offset between several chronologies of the early period of the Roman Republic, Varro created four fictitious "dictator-years" in 333, 324, 309 and 301 BC, during which a dictator was the sole magistrate in charge. Dates before 300 BC are therefore wrong, but still used by convention in academic research. "Correct dates" can be found by removing up to four years from the Varronian date, eg. 340 (Varro) is 336 BC, 304 (Varro) is 303 BC.) was a celebrated politician and general of the Roman Republic, who was five times consul, three times magister equitum, and twice dictator. He was the most important Roman commander during the Second Samnite War (327–304 BC), during which he received three triumphs.

He was a member of the patrician gens Papiria of ancient Rome. Cursor's strictness was proverbial; he was a man of immense bodily strength, while his bravery was beyond dispute. He was given the cognomen Cursor from his swiftness of foot.

Most of what is known of Cursor's life comes from the monumental History of Rome written by Livy during the reign of Augustus. Livy portrayed Cursor as an invincible hero, who avenged the humiliation of the Caudine Forks in 321 BC, when the Roman army had to pass under the yoke. In a famous digression, he even wrote that had Alexander the Great turned his army against Rome, he would have met his match with Cursor. With this narrative, Livy participated in the Roman propaganda sponsored by Augustus, which idealised several figures of the first part of the Republic. As a result, it is difficult to separate his life from the fiction elaborated by later Roman authors.

== Family background ==
Cursor belonged to the patrician gens Papiria. The first Papirii of importance were Gaius and Manius Papirius, respectively the first Pontifex Maximus and Rex Sacrorum of the Republic in 509. However, there is some doubt of the authenticity of these offices, as they could have been invented by a later Papirius to enhance the prestige of his family. The Papirii were one of the last patrician gentes to reach the consulship, with Lucius Papirius Mugillanus, only elected in 444. Cursor's grandfather was censor in 393, then consular tribune in 387 and 385. Livy gives this man the cognomen Cursor, the first time it appears in history, but in a later statement says that the cognomen Cursor was first bestowed to his grandson because of his running speed. It is therefore more likely that the cognomen of Cursor's grandfather was Mugillanus, the most important branch of the Papirii in the 5th and 4th centuries, because Cursor himself is sometimes called Mugillanus in ancient sources. The structure of Roman names was fluid at the time, and several contemporary changes of cognomen are recorded, such as Appius Claudius Caecus, initially named Crassus. Likewise, Cursor's initial name was probably Mugillanus.

Cursor's father was named Spurius, but nothing is known on his life. Robert Develin suggests that Cursor was born circa 365.

== Career ==
=== Magister equitum (340 BC) ===
The first mention of Cursor in history took place in 340 with his appointment as Magister equitum by his cousin, the dictator Lucius Papirius Crassus. The reason for the appointment of a dictator was the death of the consul Publius Decius Mus while fighting the Latins, and the illness of the other, the famous Titus Manlius Torquatus. Since 341 Rome had been waging the Latin War against its former Latin allies. Livy says that the dictator Crassus was supposed to repel an army from the city of Antium which was operating in southern Latium, but did not engage them. However, modern historians reject most of the details told by Livy on this war, as he made several anachronisms derived from the Social War of 91–87 BC.

=== Praetor (332 BC) ===
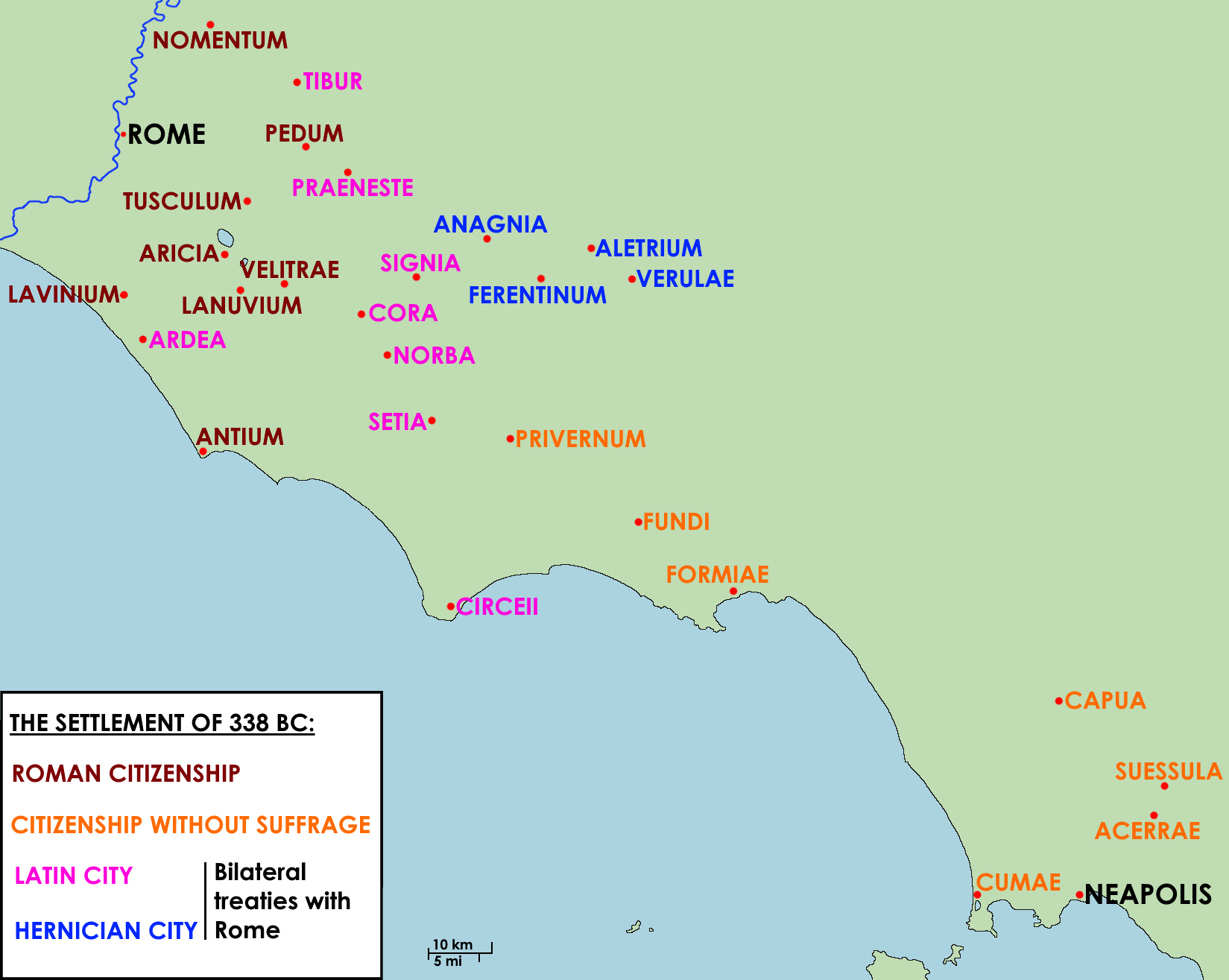
Map of the Settlement made by Rome with Latin and Italian communities after the Latin War, including Acerrae.

In 332, Cursor might have been the praetor who passed the law granting half-citizenship to the city of Acerrae in Campania, 16 km northeast of Naples. Called lex Papiria de civitate Acerranorum, it is the oldest known law passed by a praetor. However, it is also possible that this man, only named "Lucius Papirius" by Livy, was the dictator of 340, or the future censor of 318, both named Lucius Papirius Crassus. After its victory at the end of the Latin War, Rome overhauled its relationships with the cities under its domination, by using a range of different statuses. Campanian cities were given half-citizenship, called civitas sine suffragio ("citizenship without suffrage"). This policy was likely inspired by Quintus Publilius Philo, who was the leading proponent of the Roman expansion towards Campania, and also seating censor in 332.

=== Consul I (326 BC) ===
The elections for 326 were subject to an intense political battle related to the Struggle of the Orders—the plebeians' campaign to obtain equal rights with the patricians, which took place during the fourth century. The consul elected first in the previous year, the plebeian Publilius Philo, was normally in charge of holding the elections, but as he was besieging Naples and could not come back to Rome, he appointed the plebeian Marcus Claudius Marcellus dictator for this purpose. However, the all-patrician College of Augurs found that Marcellus had been faultily appointed and led to his resignation. This move was doubtless a political manoeuvre from the patricians, as by doing so the augurs forced the appointment of an interrex, who was always a patrician. Interreges typically occurred when a plebeian were in position to conduct the elections. However, Livy records 15 interreges in the elections for 326, the highest number ever in a single election, which means that the political struggle lasted for at least 70 days—as an interrex served for up to five days, and was replaced by another one if he could not succeed in holding the elections.

The 15th interrex was Lucius Aemilius Mamercinus Privernas, who presided over the elections of Cursor and the plebeian Gaius Poetelius Libo Visolus. Poetelius was the consul prior, which means the Centuriate Assembly elected him before Cursor; it was the first time that a plebeian (Poetelius) was elected consul prior through an election held by a patrician. Some sources make Poetelius the same as the man who was already consul in 360 and 346, but such a gap is improbable and Cursor's colleague was more likely his son. Aemilius Privernas and Cursor possibly belonged to a group of patricians headed by the Aemilii that supported the demands of the plebeian elite, at the time championed by Publilius Philo.

Both consuls held command during the Second Samnite war, which had started the previous year after the Samnites took control of Naples. Livy does not distinguish the consuls' activity; he says that they captured Allifae (modern Alife), Callifae (perhaps near Pratella), and Rufrium (likely Presenzano). All three cities are located in the valley of the Volturno in northern Campania. However, the story can be doubted as Livy tells later that Allifae was still under Samnite control.

The main feature of their consulship was the Lex Poetelia Papiria de nexis, which abolished nexum, a form of debt-bondage.

=== First dictatorship and the quarrel with Rullianus (325 BC) ===
The next year, Cursor was appointed dictator by the consul Lucius Furius Camillus, who was too ill to lead the army against the Samnites. Cursor in turn chose Quintus Fabius Maximus Rullianus as his magister equitum.

Livy tells that while they were already campaigning in Samnium, Cursor learnt that the auspices had not been properly taken and he had to redo the process in Rome. He left Rullianus on the field, but forbade him to engage the enemy. Rullianus disobeyed when he heard of the presence of a reckless Samnite army, which he crushed at Imbrinium. He then burnt the spoils to prevent Cursor from using them in a triumph, and sent a letter to the senate about his victory. Once aware of his subordinate's disobedience, Cursor rushed to the camp and sentenced him to death. Despite supplications from the army, the senate, and the tribunes of the plebs, Cursor only withdrew his death order when Rullianus and his father Marcus Fabius Ambustus knelt and apologised before him.

The story is very elaborate and most details are invented. Several modern historians have suggested it is an anticipation of the rivalry between the dictator Fabius Maximus (Rullianus' grandson) and his magister equitum Marcus Minucius Rufus in 217 BC. However, it is possible that the bare event—that Cursor and Rullianus quarrelled—is historical. Livy mentions that the story was told by Fabius Pictor, the first Roman historian and a relative of Rullianus. Perhaps some details—such as the episode of the burnt spoils—come from family tradition, or private archives kept by the Fabii.

At the end of his dictatorship, Cursor vowed the construction of the Temple of Quirinus, which was finally dedicated by his son during his first consulship on 17 February 293. The temple was built on the top of the Quirinal Hill, east of the current Palazzo Barberini. The reason for the long delay (32 years) was possibly that the construction had to be funded by Cursor and also because his son waited until he became consul to make the dedication. This ceremony could only be summoned by a magistrate with imperium. The vowing of a temple to Quirinus by Cursor was the first time in Roman history that an individual pledged to build a temple on private money alone. The few temples built before were funded by the state, but Cursor's example was rapidly followed by many others in the third century, thanks to the rapid conquest of Italy by the Republic, which brought considerable booty.

=== Consul II (320 BC) ===
Like in 326, the elections for 320 were subject to trouble. In 321, the two consuls were trapped in a Samnite ambush and forced to pass under the yoke, a famous event known as the disaster of the Caudine Forks. They shut themselves in their home once they returned to Rome, and only appointed a dictator for holding the elections. However, the dictator Quintus Fabius Ambustus (perhaps the uncle of Fabius Rullianus) was forced to resign after a fault was found during his appointment; his successor Marcus Aemilius Papus likewise resigned. This led the consuls to in turn abdicate; possibly followed by all the other magistrates. The elections were then held immediately, without waiting until the end of the consular year. Two interreges are mentioned, Fabius Rullianus, then Marcus Valerius Corvus, who successfully presided over the elections. Following the early abdication of the consuls, the consular year started for some years in late autumn or early winter.

Cursor was thus elected consul a second time, together with the plebeian Quintus Publilius Philo, consul for the third time. Livy states explicitly that Philo was the consul prior and Cursor posterior, but the Fasti Capitolini reverse the consuls' order and give Cursor the first place. The Fasti were made under Augustus by the College of Pontiffs, whose members often moved their ancestors to first place in order to enhance the prestige of their family—a policy supported by Augustus who tried to revive several prominent patrician gentes—since being elected prior was the subject of great pride. Conversely, they moved to second place some men that had repeated consulships, such as Philo, to avoid the comparison with Augustus, who continuously held the consulship between 31 and 23 BC.

The election of both consuls broke the Lex Genucia, passed in 342, which theoretically forbade iteration of a magistracy within ten years. Cursor had been consul in 326, and Philo in 327. However, Corey Brennan suggests that the ban was not on iteration within any ten-year period, but within the first ten years after the law was passed; this interval had lapsed by 332. Philo is the only securely attested political ally of Cursor, as they are found together in office several times, and they likely ran in the elections together in a political ticket. This pattern of a patrician and a plebeian repeatedly sharing the consulship or other magistracies is a feature of Roman politics in the middle Republic, and multiple instances are known, including that of Cursor's son, who shared the consulship twice with Spurius Carvilius Maximus. Cursor and Philo were at the time the most competent generals, and Livy writes it was the main reason behind their election because of the military situation after the Caudine Forks. Stephen Oakley nevertheless doubts that their election was as unanimous as Livy tells.

Philo received command of the army in Samnium, near Caudium, where he won a battle. Meanwhile, Cursor could advance unhindered to Arpi in Apulia, from where he besieged Luceria in order to recover the Roman hostages given to the Samnites after the Caudine Forks. Then Philo moved to Luceria and took over the siege, while Cursor destroyed the supply lines of the Samnites to force an engagement. At this point, a delegation of Taras attempted to mediate between the Romans and the Samnites, probably trying to favour the latter. While pretending to consider the Tarentine offer, Cursor prepared for battle. The next day, the consuls rejected the peace offer and attacked the surprised Samnites, who were defeated. Cursor then resumed the siege of Luceria, which later surrendered. The Roman hostages were returned, the standards recovered, and Cursor forced the garrison to in turn pass under the yoke, so he could wash the humiliation of the Caudine Forks.

This story told by Livy has nevertheless been strongly challenged by modern historians as early as 1870. E. T. Salmon considers that Livy's story is "utterly incredible", because a peace treaty was concluded after the Caudine Forks and that five years of peace followed. He assigns the events told by Livy in 320 to 315, when Cursor was also in charge of the military operations. Other historians have moved to later years the events told by Livy, notably the Tarentine mediation.

=== Consul III (319 BC) ===
Cursor was reelected consul in 319, this time as consul prior, with the plebeian Quintus Aulius Cerretanus, who had already been consul in 323.

=== Consul IV (315 BC) ===
In 315, Cursor was elected to a fourth consulship, alongside his former colleague Publilius Philo, again as consul prior. The Second Samnite War entered in its second phase that year, following the five year peace signed after the Caudine Forks, which is probably the main reason for the election of Philo and Cursor, as they were the two most experienced commanders at Rome.

As explained above, Livy's description of the campaign for 320 mostly refer to events that took place in 315, so Cursor likely besieged and took Luceria that year. However, his account of the events for 315 are very confused: he says that Fabius Rullianus was appointed dictator and commanded the army for the whole year, while the consuls stayed in Rome, which is constitutionally impossible. A more credible explanation is that Fabius became dictator only when the Samnite threat arose.

=== Consul V (313 BC) ===
In 313, Cursor was elected consul prior alongside the plebeian Gaius Junius Bubulcus Brutus, who had already been consul in 317.

=== Dictator (310 BC) ===
The final mention of Cursor in the sources took place in 310, when he was appointed dictator for the second time. He in turn appointed as magister equitum his former colleague Bubulcus Brutus.

In 310 BC, when the Samnites again rose, Cursor was appointed dictator for the second time, and gained a decisive victory at Longula, in honour of which he celebrated a magnificent triumph. Captured Samnite weapons were displayed in the triumphal procession. According to Livy, the Samnite gold-plated shields made a strong impression, so Cursor gave them to the silversmiths of the Forum to hang outside their tabernae as decorations. This practice of publicly displaying enemy spoils was new at the time in Rome, and was inspired by the Greeks. Livy adds that from this point on aediles regularly decorated the Forum for the Ludi Romani after the precedent set by Cursor.

Several modern historians have nevertheless cast some doubts on the whole event, as many features of both the battle and its subsequent triumph closely resemble the later triumph of Cursor's son in 293, likewise against the Samnites.

His cognomen, Cursor, means "The Runner", as he was able to walk over 50 Roman miles a day in full marching order and demanded the same from his soldiers. Legend says that when cavalry veterans came to him asking for some privileges, he gave them but one privilege:

That you may not say I never excuse you anything, I excuse you from rubbing your horses' backs when you dismount.

Such harshness to his soldiers allowed them to be defeated initially. But later he had regained their good-will by more lenient treatment and lavish promises of booty; they fought with enthusiasm and gained a complete victory.

His son of the same name, also a distinguished general, completed the subjection of Samnium (272 BC). He set up a sundial, the first of its kind in Rome, in the temple of Quirinus.

== Legacy ==
=== Comparison with Alexander the Great ===
In the 9th book of his Ab Urbe Condita, Livy made a much-discussed disgression on Alexander the Great, who had died a few years before the events he describes. He says that Rome would have withstood an attack from Alexander if he had attempted to conquer it. This passage comes just after he drew a panegyric of Cursor, and both men are implicitly compared. The disgression may originate from the real fear at the time in Rome of a Greek invasion of Italy. During the Pyrrhic War, Appius Caecus made a famous speech—the first ever recorded in Rome—in which he mentions this possibility.

=== In Augustus' Hall of Fame (2 BC) ===
In 2 BC, Augustus finished the construction of a new Forum around the Temple of Mars Ultor. On either side of the forum were two galleries of marble statues; on the northeastern side he placed the statues of his ancestors and other members of his family, starting with Aeneas; on the southwestern side he placed a gallery of heroes, dubbed a "Hall of Fame", starting with Romulus, the first Roman king. Each statue had an elogium, a plaque telling the deeds of the man portrayed. It is possible that Augustus was inspired by Virgil's Aeneid and Livy's Ab Urbe Condita—the two most important literary works of his reign—when making his choice of statues. Cursor logically features among the list of heroes, and his elogium is partially preserved. The surviving part tells about the quarrel with Rullianus.

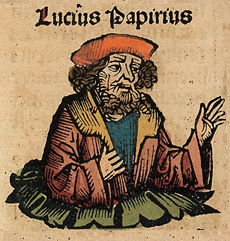
Fantasy portrait of Lucius Papirius, as depicted in the Nuremberg Chronicles, c. 1493 AD.

=== Modern Era ===
Cursor features in the Nuremberg Chronicle, an illustrated encyclopaedia composed by Hartmann Schedel and published in 1493. Schedel told about his quarrel with Rullianus.

Named Lucio Papirio or Lucio Papirio dittatore, he is the subject of several Baroque operas.

The Dutch Golden Age painter Gerard De Lairesse pictured the famous story of Cursor's quarrel with Fabius Maximus Rullianus in 1688. The painting was part of an ensemble to decorate the Binnenhof in The Hague.

In the 18th century, Caleb Whitefoord published whimsical misreadings of newspaper texts over the signature "Papyrius Cursor."

== Bibliography ==
=== Ancient sources ===
- Livy, Ab Urbe Condita (English translation by Rev. Canon Roberts on Wikisource).

=== Modern sources ===
- Sheila L. Ager, Interstate Arbitrations in the Greek World, 337–90 B.C., Berkeley, University of California Press, 1996.
- Jean-Luc Bastien, Le triomphe romain et son utilisation politique : à Rome aux trois derniers siècles de la République, Rome, Collection de l'École française de Rome, 2007.
- T. Corey Brennan, The Praetorship in the Roman Republic, Oxford University Press, 2000.
- T. Robert S. Broughton, The Magistrates of the Roman Republic, American Philological Association, 1951–1952.
- Timothy J. Cornell, The Beginnings of Rome: Italy and Rome from the Bronze Age to the Punic Wars (c. 1000–264 BC), London, Routledge, 1995.
- Robert Develin, Patterns in Office-Holding 366-49 B.C., Brussels, Latomus, 1979.
- Henri Etcheto, "Cognomen et appartenance familiale dans l'aristocratie médio-républicaine : à propos de l'identité du consul patricien de 328 av. J.-C.", in Athenaeum, 91–2, 2003, pp. 445–468.
- Endre Ferenczy, From the patrician state to the patricio-plebeian state, Amsterdam, A.M. Hakkert, 1976.
- Gary Forsythe, A Critical History of Early Rome, from Prehistory to the First Punic War, Berkeley, University of California Press, 2005.
- Joseph Geiger, The First Hall of Fame, A Study of the Statues in the Forum Augustum, Leiden/Boston, Brill, 2008.
- Andreas Graeber, Auctoritas patrum, Formen und Wege der Senatsherrschaft zwischen Politik und Tradition, Berlin, Springer-Verlag, 2001.
- Friedrich Münzer, Roman Aristocratic Parties and Families, translated by Thérèse Ridley, Johns Hopkins University Press, 1999 (originally published in 1920).
- H. Nissen, "Der Caudinische Friede", in Rheinisches Museum für Philologie, 1870, Neue Folge, Vol. 25 (1870), pp. 1–65.
- Stephen P. Oakley, A Commentary on Livy: Books VI–X, Volume I, Introduction and Book VI, Oxford University Press, 1997.
- ——, A Commentary on Livy: Books VI–X, Volume II, Books VI-VIII, Oxford University Press, 1998.
- ——, A Commentary on Livy: Books VI–X, Volume III, Book IX, Oxford University Press, 2005.
- ——, A Commentary on Livy: Books VI–X, Volume IV, Book X, Oxford University Press, 2005.
- August Pauly, Georg Wissowa, Friedrich Münzer, et alii, Realencyclopädie der Classischen Altertumswissenschaft (abbreviated RE), J. B. Metzler, Stuttgart, 1894–1980.
- K. A. Raaflaub & M. Toher (editors), Between Republic and Empire. Interpretations of Augustus and his Principate, Berkeley, 1990.
- Jörg Rüpke, Anne Glock, David Richardson (translator), Fasti Sacerdotum: A Prosopography of Pagan, Jewish, and Christian Religious Officials in the City of Rome, 300 BC to AD 499, Oxford University Press, 2008.
- Edward Togo Salmon, Samnium and the Samnites, Cambridge University Press, 1967.
- Hartmann Schedel, Liber Chronicarum [Nuremberg Chronicle], Nuremberg, 1493. [digital scan on Cambridge University Library website].
- E. Stuart Staveley, "The political aims of Appius Claudius Caecus", in Historia: Zeitschrift für Alte Geschichte, Bd. 8, H. 4 (Oct., 1959), pp. 410–433.
- Lily Ross Taylor and T. Robert S. Broughton, "The Order of the Two Consuls' Names in the Yearly Lists", Memoirs of the American Academy in Rome, 19 (1949), pp. 3–14.
- ——, "New Indications of Augustan Editing in the Capitoline Fasti", Classical Philology, Vol. 46, No. 2 (Apr., 1951), pp. 73–80.
- —— and T. Robert S. Broughton, "The Order of the Consuls' Names in Official Republican Lists", Historia: Zeitschrift für Alte Geschichte, vol. 17, part 2 (Apr., 1968), pp. 166–172.
- Frank William Walbank, A. E. Astin, M. W. Frederiksen, R. M. Ogilvie (editors), The Cambridge Ancient History, vol. VII, part 2, The Rise of Rome to 220 B.C., Cambridge University Press, 1989.
- Adam Ziolkowski, The Temples of Mid-Republican Rome and their Historical and Topographical Context, Rome, 1992.

Political offices
Preceded by L. Cornelius Lentulus; Q. Publilius Philo	Roman consul 326 BC; With: Gaius Poetelius Libo Visolus	Succeeded by L. Furius Camillus; D. Junius Brutus Scaeva
Preceded by T. Veturius Calvinus; Sp. Postumius Albinus Caudinus	Roman consul II; 320 BC; With: Quintus Publilius Philo	Succeeded by Q. Aulius Cerretanus; Lucius Papirius Cursor
Preceded by Q. Publilius Philo; Lucius Papirius Cursor	Roman consul III; 319 BC; With: Quintus Aulius Cerretanus	Succeeded by M. Foslius Flaccinator; L. Plautius Venox
Preceded by Sp. Nautius Rutilus; M. Popillius Laenas	Roman consul IV; 315 BC; With: Quintus Publilius Philo	Succeeded by M. Poetelius Libo; G. Sulpicius Longus
Preceded by M. Poetelius Libo; G. Sulpicius Longus	Roman consul V 313 BC; With: Gaius Junius Bubulcus Brutus	Succeeded by M. Valerius Maximus Corvinus; P. Decius Mus
