= Lucius Furius Camillus (consul 338 BC) =

4th century BC Roman consul and general

Lucius Furius Camillus was a Roman politician and general who served as consul of the Roman Republic in 338 BC and in 325 BC. During his 338 BC consulship, he, along with Gaius Maenius, commanded Rome's legions during the Battle of Pedum, during which Camillus engaged forces from the cities of Tibur and Praeneste. Afterwards, Maenius and he were awarded with a triumph and equestrian statues in the Roman Forum. During his second consulship in 325 BC, he was assigned the duty of dealing with the Samnites as a part of the Second Samnite War (326–304 BC). However, he fell ill and had to relinquish his command, prompting the appointment of Lucius Papirius Cursor as dictator.

Political offices
Preceded by Tiberius Aemilius Mamercinus and Quintus Publilius Philo	Consul of the Roman Republic with Gaius Maenius; 338 BC	Succeeded by Gaius Sulpicius Longus and Publius Aelius Paetus
Preceded by Gaius Poetelius Libo Visolus and Lucius Papirius Cursor	Consul of the Roman Republic with Decimus Junius Brutus Scaeva; 325 BC	Succeeded by Dictator Lucius Papirius Cursor
