= Pacuvius Calavius =

Chief magistrate of Capua during the Second Punic War

Pacuvius Calavius was the chief magistrate of Capua during the Second Punic War (218–201 BC). In the aftermath of the Battle of Lake Trasimene, he prevented the people of Capua from surrendering the city to Hannibal. When the Capuans finally capitulated, he dissuaded his son from a rash attempt on the life of the Carthaginian general.

== Background ==
Calavius was descended from the noble Campanian family of the Calavii, which first appeared in history a century earlier, during the Great Samnite War. He was connected by marriage with some of the leading families at Rome. His wife, Claudia, was the daughter of Publius Claudius Pulcher, consul in 249 BC, and his daughter, Calavia, married Marcus Livius Salinator, consul in 219 and 207 BC. He may have had a brother, Sthenius, but the historian Livius states that he was one of the Ninnii Celeres.

In 218 BC, Hannibal invaded Italy, and began his relentless march down the peninsula, inflicting devastating losses to the Romans at the Battle of the Trebia, and the following year at the Battle of Lake Trasimene. As Hannibal approached Campania, Calavius, who was chief magistrate of Capua, apprehended that the people were so frightened by the approach of the Carthaginian forces, that they would demand the surrender of the city, and perhaps massacre the Capuan senate, which opposed capitulation.

== Calavius reconciles the senate and the people ==
In order to prevent the collapse of the Capuan government, Calavius devised a clever plan to bring about the reconciliation of the senate and the people. He assembled the senate, and warned them of their peril. On his assurance that he could preserve their lives, the senators allowed themselves to be shut in the senate-house under guard. Calavius went out to meet the people, and presented them with a surprising option.

He proposed that the people should proceed with their plan to try the senators and sentence them as they saw fit; but for each senator executed, the people should first choose a better man to replace him. The citizens quickly found that it was easier to condemn their leaders than to agree on their replacements, and again entrusted themselves to the senate.

== The attempt on Hannibal ==
Following the disaster of the Battle of Cannae in 216 BC, Hannibal entered Campania, and Capua yielded to the inevitable. Making Capua his winter quarters, Hannibal invited Calavius and his son, Perolla, to a banquet at the house of another noble family, the Ninii Celeres. Perolla was a supporter of Decius Magius, who had opposed Hannibal's entry into the city, and argued for an alliance with Rome. It was Hannibal's plan to win over the Capuan nobility, whom he knew to be hostile to him.

During the banquet, Perolla, who made no pretense of enjoying himself, followed his father into the garden, and revealed a sword, with which he proposed to assassinate the Carthaginian general. Horrified, Calavius pleaded with his son to reconsider, arguing that such a deed, even if accomplished, would be a betrayal both of the young man's father and his city; and furthermore, that the plan was unlikely to succeed, but Perolla would certainly be cut down in the attempt. Persuaded by his father's entreaties, the younger Calavius threw his sword over the garden wall and returned to the hall.

== Reputation ==
Despite his noble birth, and successful prevention of first a massacre and then the rash action of his son, the Roman historians describe Calavius as a man of unlimited ambition and yearning for power, who obtained his position through trickery. Some of this may have been interpolation from his skillful manipulation of the political crisis in 217, or it may reflect the Roman viewpoint of a powerful magistrate, whose actions placed the needs of his own city ahead of Rome.

== See also ==
- Calavia (gens)
