= Lucius Cornelius Lentulus (consul 327 BC) =

Roman consul in 327 BC and dictator 320 BC

Lucius Cornelius Lentulus was a Roman politician from the patrician gens Cornelia in the fourth century BC.

== Career ==
Lentulus, who was the progenitor of the Lentulii Branch of the Cornelia gens, served as consul with Quintus Publilius Philo in 327 BC, and fought in the second Samnite war. In 321 BC, after the defeat at the Battle of the Caudine Forks he is said to have persuaded the Romans to surrender.

In 320 he became dictator.
