= Quintus Aulius Cerretanus =

4th-century BC Roman consul and general

Quintus Aulius Q. f. Q. n. Cerretanus was twice consul in the Second Samnite War, first in 323 BC with Gaius Sulpicius Longus, when he had the conduct of the war in Apulia, and a second time in 319 with Lucius Papirius Cursor, when he conquered the Ferentani and received their city into surrender.

Aulius was magister equitum to the dictator Quintus Fabius Maximus Rullianus in 315, and fought a battle against the Samnites without consulting the dictator, in which he was slain after killing the Samnite general.

== See also ==
- Aulia (gens)

== Footnotes ==
Preceded by (no consuls this year)	Consul of the Roman Republic with Gaius Sulpicius Longus; 323 BC	Succeeded by Quintus Fabius Maximus Rullianus and Lucius Fulvius Curvus
Preceded by Quintus Publilius Philo and Lucius Papirius Cursor	Consul of the Roman Republic with Lucius Papirius Cursor; 319 BC	Succeeded by Marcus Foslius Flaccinator and Lucius Plautius Venno
