= Lanuvium =

Roman settlement

Coordinates: 41.674696°N 12.697580°E

- Lanuvio
- Map of comune of Lanuvio within Lazio
- Interactive map of Lanuvium
- Type: Settlement
- Periods: Roman Republic Roman Empire
- Cultures: Ancient Rome
- Location: Comune di Lanuvio
- Region: Lazio

Site notes
- Public access: yes

Lanuvium, modern Lanuvio, is an ancient city of Latium vetus, some 32 kilometres (20 mi) southeast of Rome, a little southwest of the Via Appia.

Situated on an isolated hill projecting south from the main mass of the Alban Hills, Lanuvium commanded an extensive view over the low country between it and the sea.

== History ==
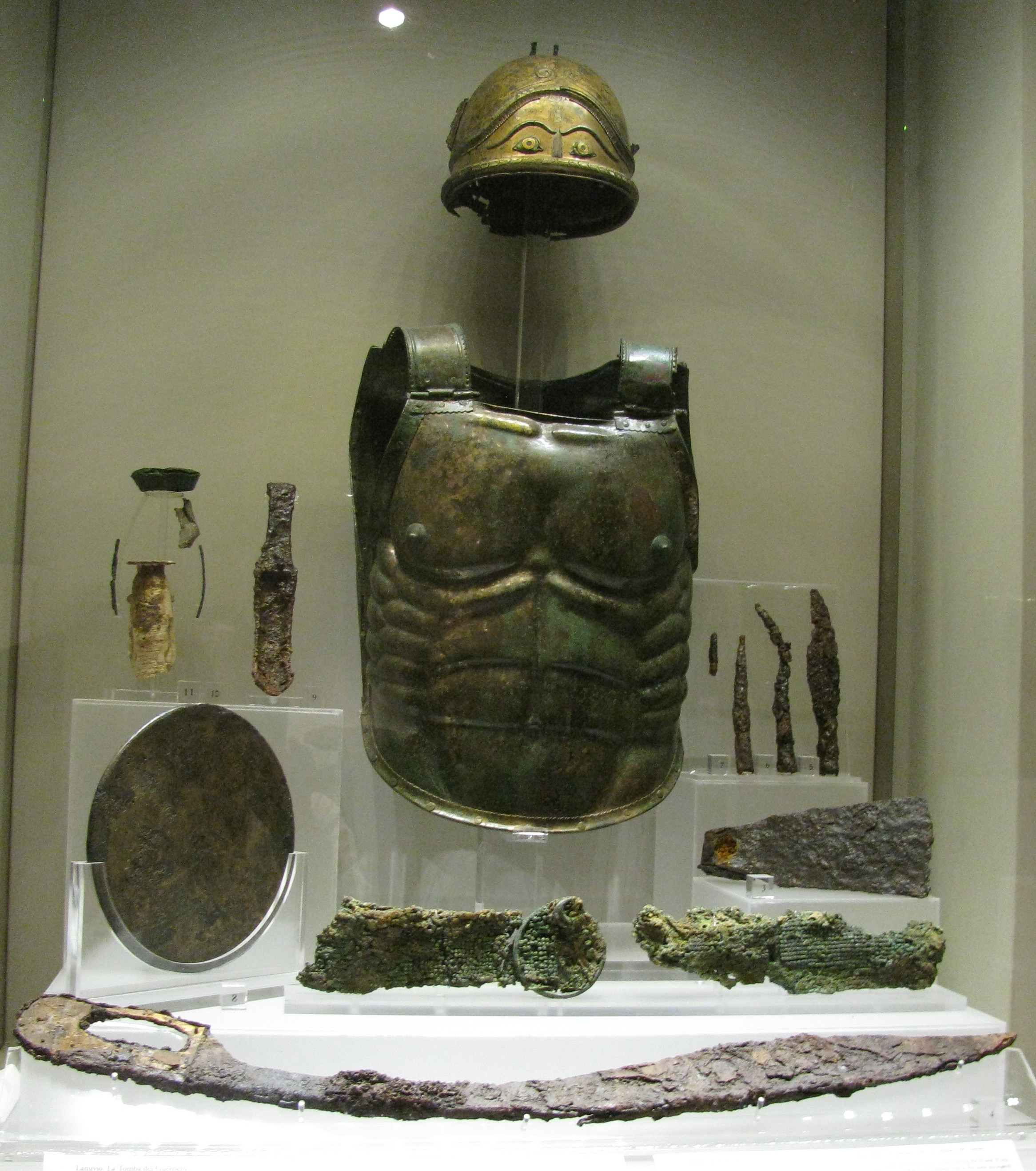
Warrior tomb from Lanuvium (5th century BC), located in the Baths of Diocletian Museum, Rome

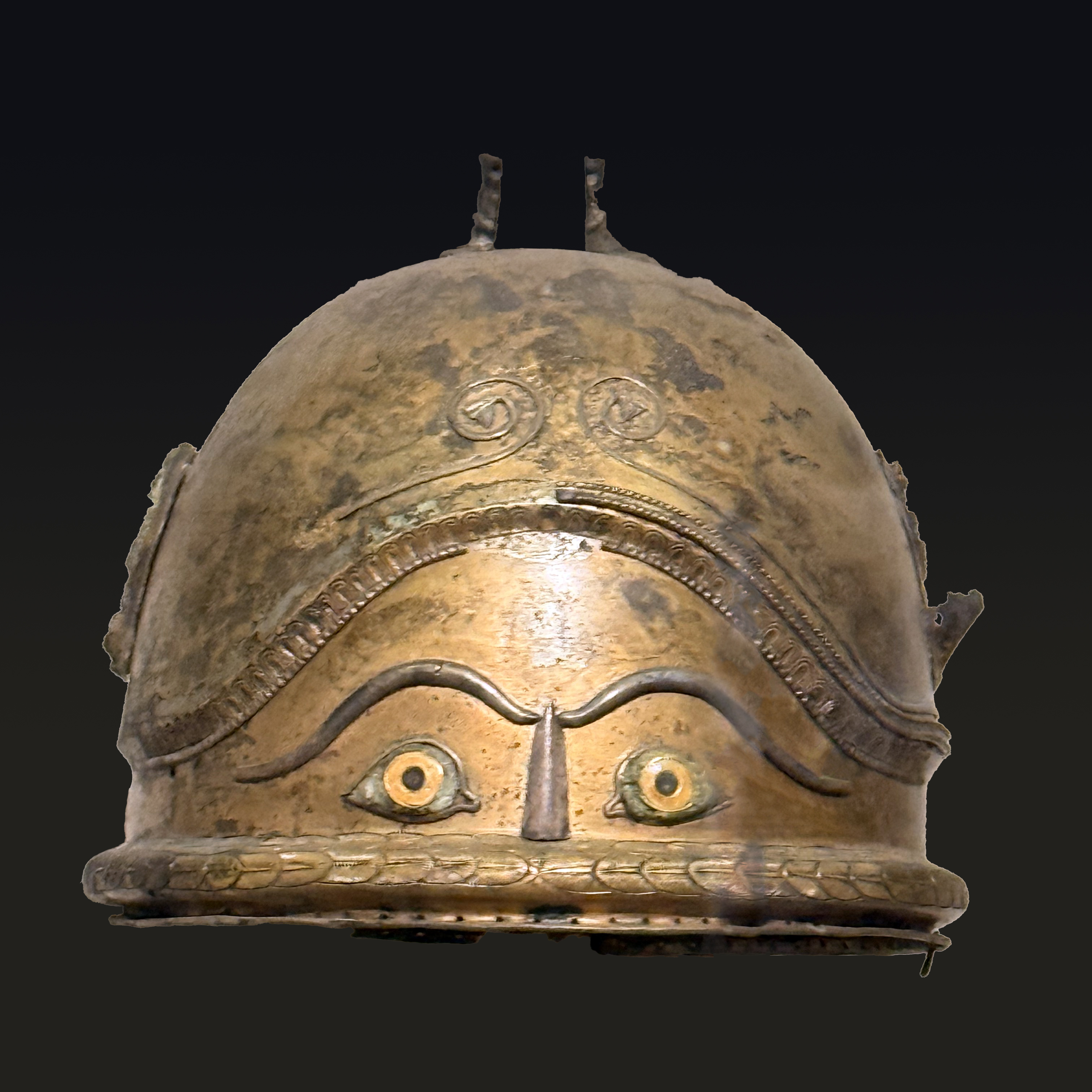
Close-up of the helmet

According to legend, Lanuvium was founded by Diomedes, or by one Lanoios, an exile from Troy. The first documented traces of the settlement date from the 9th century BC and by the 6th century BC it was part of the Latin League.

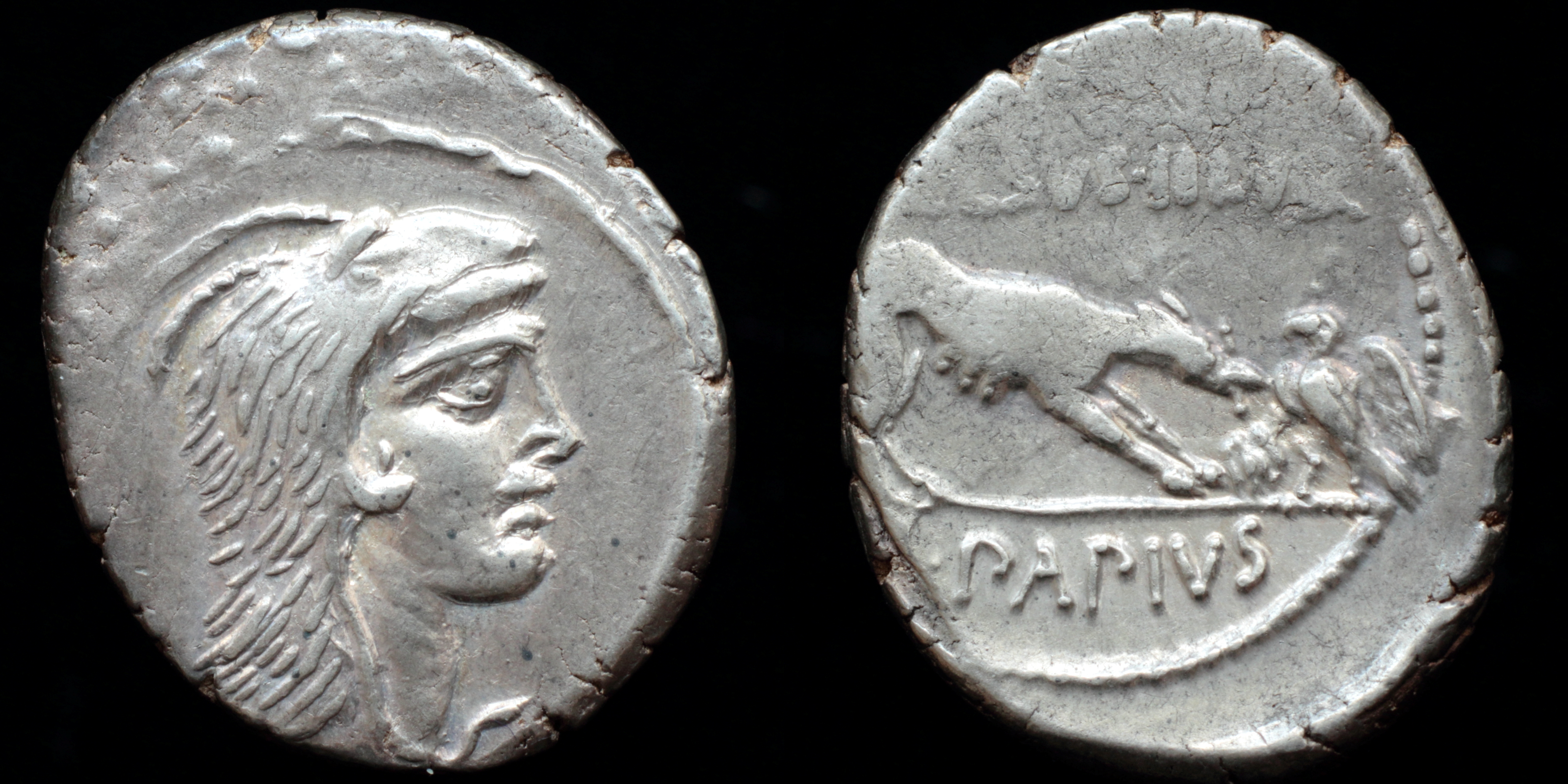
Silver denarius struck by L. Papius Celsus in Rome 45 BC. The obverse depicts the Juno Sospita whose main center of worshipping was Lanuvium and the reverse depicts a founder myth. (Note: When a fire broke out spontaneously in the forest, a wolf brought some dry wood in his mouth and threw it upon the fire, and an eagle fanned the flame with the motion of his wings. But a fox, after wetting his tail in the river, was trying to put it out. Wolf and eagle got the upper hand and the fox went away. Bronze monuments of these animals are supposed to stand in the forum of Lanuvium.)

The city warred against Rome at the battles of Aricia (504 BC) and Lake Regillus (496 BC), as well as in 383 and 341 BC, mostly with negative outcomes. Rome conquered Lanuvium in 338 BC; at first, its inhabitants did not enjoy the right of Roman citizenship, but acquired it later. In imperial times the city's chief magistrate and municipal council kept the titles of dictator and senatus respectively.

In the 11th c. the city became known as Civita Lavinia, a result of the confusion between it and ancient Lavinium.

== Cult of Juno ==
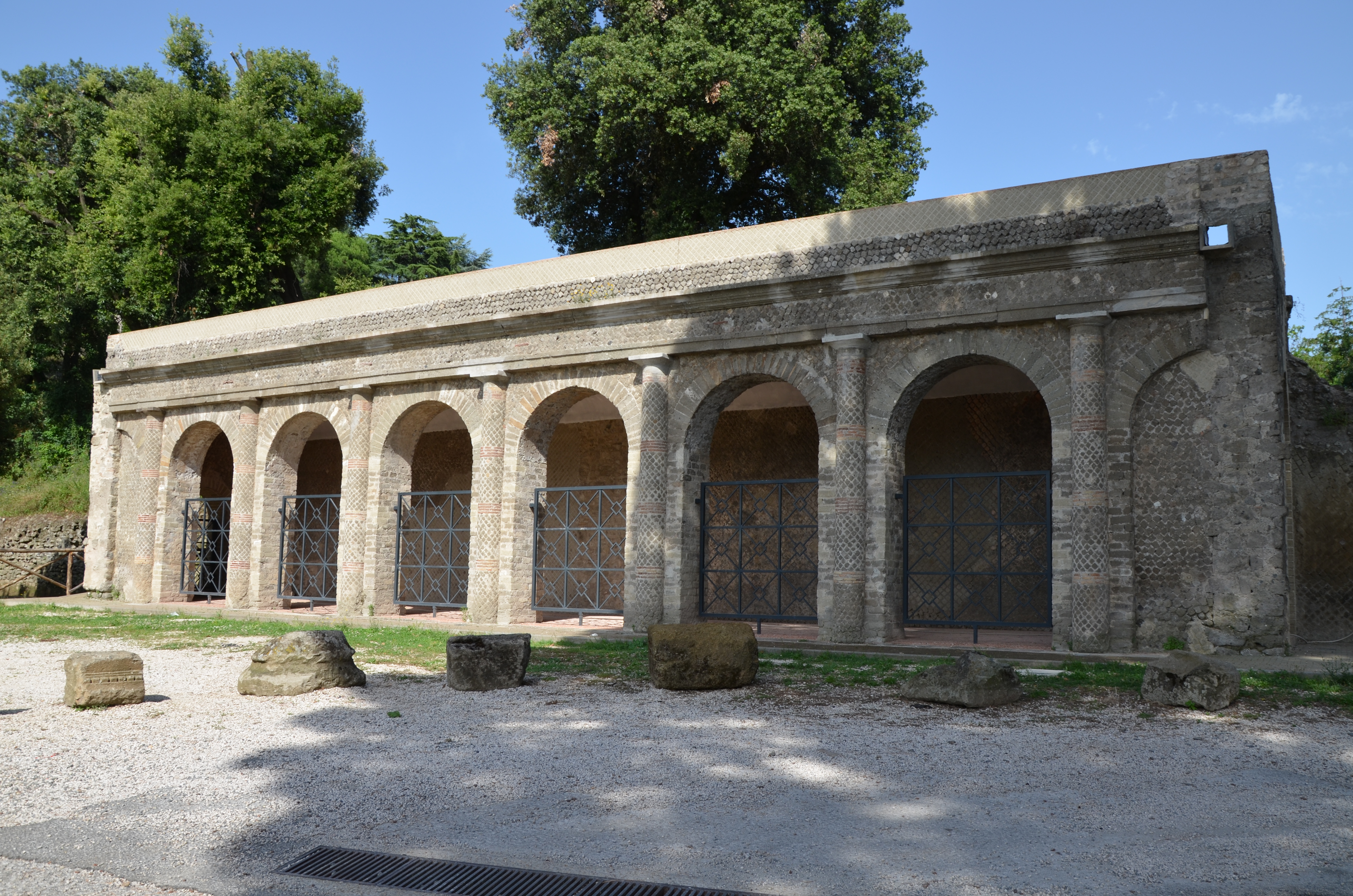
The portico of the Sanctuary of Juno Sospita

Lanuvium was especially noted for its rich and much venerated temple of Juno Sospes (Livy 8.14; Cic. Nat. D. 1.83; Fin. 2.63), from which Octavian borrowed money in 31 BC, and the possessions of which extended as far as the coast of the Mediterranean. It possessed many other temples repaired by Antoninus Pius, who was born close by (S. H. A. Ant. Pius 1), as was Commodus.

== Prominent citizens ==
One prominent native of Lanuvium was Lucius Licinius Murena (consul of 62 BC), whom Cicero defended in late 63 BC. Others include the actor Roscius (Cic. Div. 36), the political agitator Titus Annius Milo, who was convicted for the murder of Clodius (Cic. Mil. 27) and Publius Sulpicius Quirinius, consul of 12 BC and later legate of Syria.

== Monuments ==
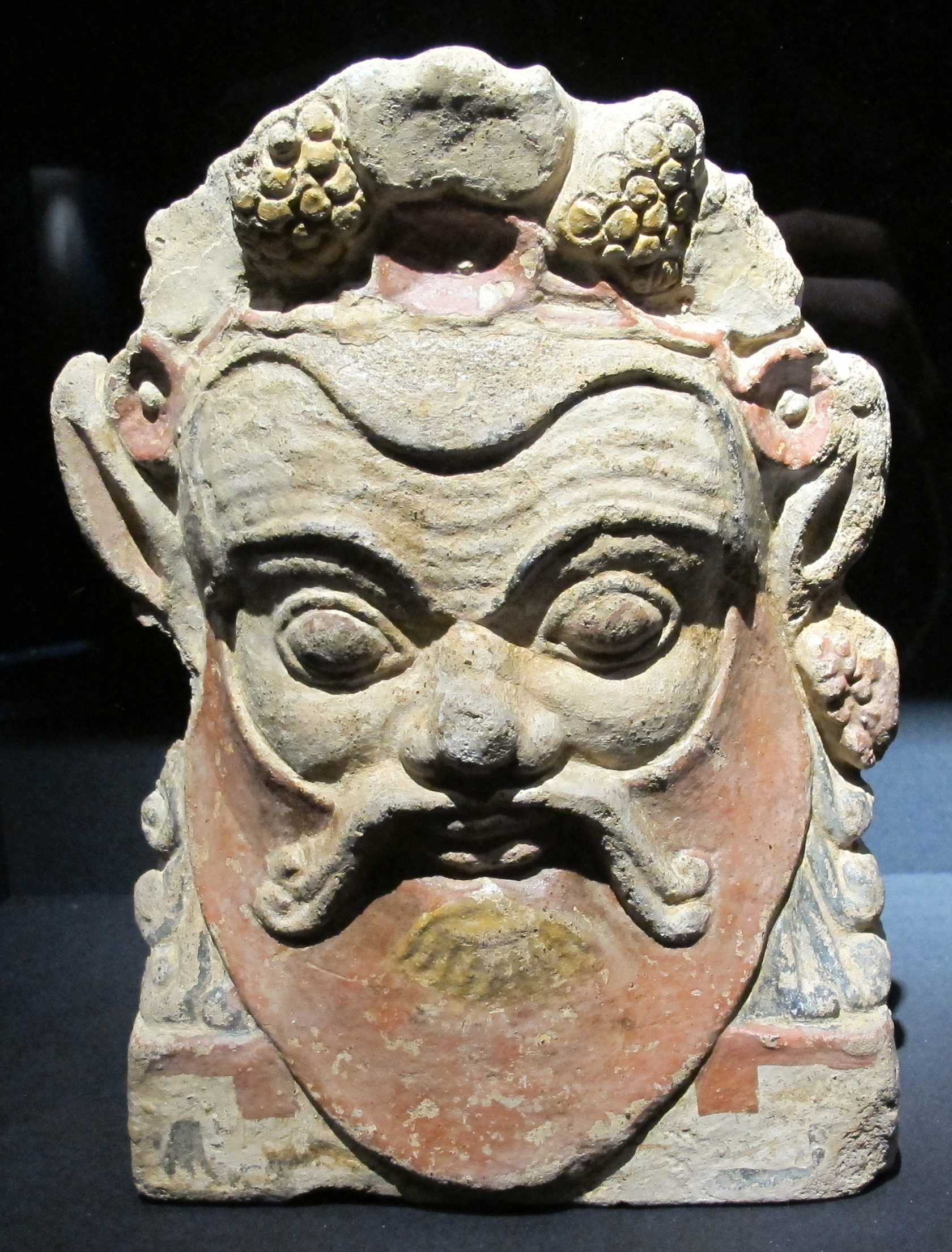
Terracotta antefix with the head of a Silenus; c. 500–490 BC., from the Baths of Diocletian at Lanuvium

Remains of the ancient theatre and of the city walls exist in the modern town, and above it is an area surrounded by a portico, in opus reticulatum, upon the north side of which is a rectangular building in opus quadratum, probably connected with the temple of Juno where archaic decorative terracottas artifacts have been found. The acropolis of the primitive city was probably on the highest point above the temple to the north. The neighborhood, which is now covered with vineyards, contains the remains of many Roman villas, one of which is traditionally attributed to the Emperor Antoninus Pius.
