= Quintus Publilius Philo =

4th century BC Roman politician

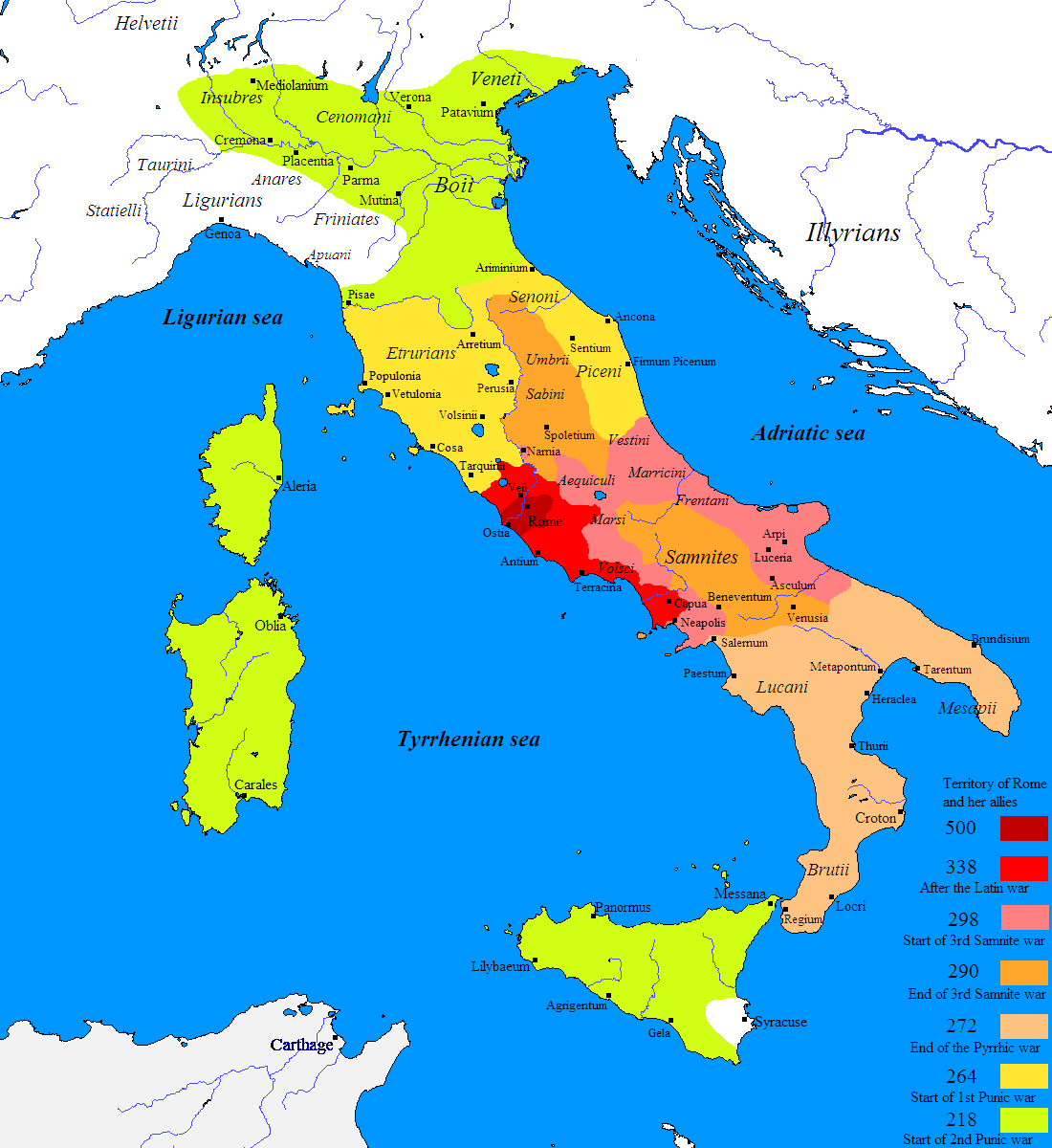
Roman expansion in Italy from 500 BC to 218 BC. The Roman Republic was expanding rapidly in the time of Publilius. The red area represents Roman territory in 338 BC, at the end of his first consulship.

Quintus Publilius Philo was a Roman politician who lived during the 4th century BC. His birth date is not provided by extant sources, however, a reasonable estimate is about 365 BC, since he first became consul in 339 BC at a time when consuls could be elected in their twenties (Livy 7.26.12). His Greek cognomen ‘Philo’ was unique to his family.

His family was plebeian, and the gens won its first attested election via Publilius Volero as tribune in 472 BC. Volero passed two important pieces of legislation which increased the power of a Tribune. Philo came from a family accustomed to promoting the rights of the plebs.

== Early career ==
Publilius first became consul in 339 BC. During his first term, he retaliated against the Latins who sought to reclaim territories that were previously lost to Rome. He was supported by the other consul Tiberius Aemilius Mamercinus. The most prominent event was Philo's assault on the Latin forces camped in the Fenectine Plains. Philo remained on the defensive of Latin territories while Mamercinus attempted to besiege Pedum.

During the same year, Philo was appointed dictator. Philo was the second plebeian to hold the office of dictator, the first being Marcus Rutilius in 356 BC. He made a series of popular reforms championing the rights of the plebeians. Such measures included legislation binding plebiscites on all citizens, giving the Comitia Centuriata greater involvement in voting on laws, and ensuring that one censor must always be a plebeian.

In 336 BC, Philo's reputation as a novus homo within the Roman senate was consolidated even further when he became the first plebeian praetor. Philo's ascension to the praetorship was opposed by the incumbent consul Sulpicius who as a patrician believed a plebeian was undeserving of the office.

Furthermore, Philo served as magister equitum (Master of the Horse) in 335 BC. A Master of the Horses was an emergency magistrate appointed by the Dictator, who held also imperium.

It is likely Philo had a political partnership with his family, as he shared this position with his (probable) brother Lucius

He went on to become censor in 332 BC likely because of the legislation he passed whilst dictator in 339. As censor Philo enrolled newly subjugated Latins as citizens, specifically the tribes of Maecia and Scaptia as a means of legitimately uniting the newly conquered Latins into the Roman Republic.

== Later career ==
In 327 BC Q. Publilius Philo was elected to the position of consul for a second time (the other consul in this year was L. Cornelius Lentulus). Philo and Lentulus were assigned commands to deal with troubles arising with the Greek colony of Palaeopolis, located near the ancient city of Nepolis. Publilius, after the Romans declared war on Palaeopolis, campaigned against them. Livy mentions that Publilius was permitted to remain in the field (he had gained a strategic position between Palaeopolis and Neapolis) despite his term as consul drawing to a close. The Senate permitted him to retain his command for the duration of the war as a proconsul, and nominated a dictator to hold elections in Rome whilst the two consuls were absent campaigning.

Publilius's command lasted through until 326 BC where Livy tells us he successfully besieged and captured Palaeopolis via assistance from inside factions. The reason for the surrender of the city is given to be due to the local Greek inhabitants being mistreated, especially by the Samnites with whom they were allied and there was a Samnite force within the city. It was with the assistance of these local elements within the city that the Romans, led by Publilius, were able to gain entrance to the city. The elements within the city (according to Livy) further deceived the Samnite garrison into leaving the city on the pretext of having them raid the Roman coast. The Samnite force was thus outside of the city when the Romans were let in and the Samnites were routed back to their own lands without their armaments.

For the feat of capturing the city and defeating the Samnites, Publilius was awarded a triumph in Rome. Livy notes that the consulship of Publilius in 327 BC (and his command and triumph in 326 BC) marked two firsts for Rome; a consul having his command extended beyond his term (as proconsul) and he was the first to have been awarded a triumph after his normal command ceased (he celebrated his Triumph at the end of the war in 326 BC, in the year after his consulship of 327 BC).

The next stage of Publilius's career, that we know of, arose in the year 320 BC with his election to the position of Consul (for the third time) alongside Lucius Papirius Cursor, to the universal appeal of the people of Rome (according to Livy). Publilius struck off his role as consul right away with discussions in the debate over the capitulation of the city of Caudium to the Samnites. After determining that the truce, which was forced on the Romans after the capitulation, was not valid because it was not decreed by the Roman people Publilius and Papirius took to the field with armies. Publilius stationed his forces in Samnium whilst Papirius marched on Leuceria. Publilius's position in Samnium threatened the Samnite forces in the region and reportedly provoked them to battle. In the engagement that followed Livy reports that Publilius's forces routed the Samnites and sacked their camp. From this victory Publilius joined his colleague Papirius at his position near Leuceria and succeeded in cutting off supplies to the city.

The Samnites camped nearby Leuceria were provoked to battle by the Romans and defeated by the combined forces of the consuls Publilius and Papirius in a surprise attack following the Romans disregarding an ultimatum to cease hostilities sent by the city of Tarentum. The attack was so successful that the Romans were once again able to take and sack the Samnite camp. For the rest of the year of 320 BC Publilius campaigned in the Apulians and Livy tells us he was successful in capturing many towns and forming treaties with others. Whilst Publilius was thus occupied Papirius, who had been left to persecute the siege of Leuceria succeeded in taking the city and inflicted the same humiliating treatment on the captured Samnites as the Romans had endured with the capitulation of Cadmium (they were forced to ‘pass under the yoke’).

The final year that we have on record for Publilius's career is 315 when he was elected to the position of consul for the fourth time. Livy omits the names of the consuls for this year, but states that they remained in Rome whilst the current war against the Samnites and the city of Saticula was run by the dictator Aemilius. We have the names of the consuls from Diodorus Siculus who notes that the Consuls for the year were Lucius Papirus and Quintus Publilius (the same pairing as had occurred in 320 BC). Diodorus states that Publilius's consulship in this year was his second consulship, however our other sources show that it was his fourth time as consul.

== Evaluation ==
Quintus Publilius Philo achieved a substantial amount across his career. Before anything he was a plebeian, something that despite his wealth and that of other wealthy plebeian families would have placed them at a disadvantage to the Roman patrician class. Despite this, Q. Publilius Philo was not only elected to a senatorial position in 352 BC, but was the first plebeian in Roman history to be elected to the position of consul in 339. This was enabled by the passing of the lex Genucia de feneratione in 342. The law restricted anyone from being appointed to more than one magisterial position at any one time, or within ten years of a previous appointment. Importantly, it required that at least one of the appointed Consuls every year to be a plebeian.

It could be surmised that he was not only popular amongst the public and the aristocracy but was also influential. Having held arguably the highest position in Rome, it is no surprise that he then went on to “[secure] the passage of three other laws believed to have been favourable to the plebs”; as well as to get himself elected to the position of Praetor 3 years later in 336:

“In this year also Q. Publilius Philo was elected as the first plebeian praetor against the opposition of the consul Sulpicius; the senate, after failing to keep the highest posts in their own hands, showed less interest in retaining the praetorship”.

In the following year Philo goes on to be named magister equitum by the dictator L. Aemilius Mamercinus; a powerful position (essentially the ‘lieutenant’ of the dictator and holding similar levels of imperium to a Praetor). In 332 he plays the role of censor; in the years 327–326, however a truly significant step is taken by the senate. Philo received his second consulship, and waged war against Paleopolis and Neapolis, as the Roman people vote for war. He moves forward to aid the other consul that year and maintains a strategically vital position between two enemy cities. As 327 comes to an end, it is clear that Philo was maintaining a vital position for the war, and rather than have him return home and lose it, a new practice is introduced. For the first time, a Consul's power is extended beyond his term, and as the 326 begins Q. Publilus Philo is awarded the position of Pro-Consul. The first Roman to ever be awarded such a position.

In being the first ever to attain the position of proconsul, Philo has once again made history. This demonstrates his significance as a political figure of the times and hints at his popularity among the people as well. Added to the honour of proconsulship he goes on to achieve a triumph for his victories in his term as proconsul; making him the first to gain a triumph post his year as consul, acto honore.

The military and political honours achieved by Philo continued, with a 3rd consulship less than a decade later. Due to an emergency military situation requiring a proven general, he led an army against the Samnites and won multiple battles, potentially leading him to receive another triumph in 320 BC.

Now this seems most interesting, as not only does the senate, which is full of patricians seem to ignore the Lex Genucia de feneratione for the 3 years prior to Philo's election to his first consulship – as the law was passed in 342 BC and he was elected in 339 BC – but once he is elected they seem to embrace him – along with his skills no doubt – with open arms, not only by honouring him numerous times and in a variety of ways, but also by seemingly ignoring the Lex Genucia yet again for his third election is 4 years sooner - as consulship was not to be awarded more than once within ten years to the same Roman - than it should have been legal. This is once again repeated five years later in 315 BC, when Philo is elected to his fourth consulship; it is debated that Philo potentially only had two consulships, as Diodorus claimed that 315 was but his second consulship, although it is not the leading theory. During the term of his final consulship in 315 he seems to have stayed in Rome, whilst the Dictator, Q. Fabius waged war abroad.

To consider the achievements of Q. Publilius Philo we must remember he is a trailblazer for the future political landscape and positions in Rome. He made history in being the first plebeian to hold the posts of both Consul and Praetor, and then the first Roman to have his imperium extended as proconsul, and the first to celebrate a triumph as a proconsul. He was honoured with the post of both dictator and being chosen as the master of horse under L. Aemilius Mamercinus. Livy tells us that he was a popular leader in both the laws he passed as dictator and in 320 BC when he was elected ‘with universal approval’ after several other candidates had been rejected. Philo was an exceptional figure and his many achievements speak for themselves when we examine his significance as a political and military figure.
