= Plautius =

Plautius is a name. Notable people with the name include:

- Plautius Lateranus (executed AD 65), Roman senator
- Plautius Quintillus (died by 175), Roman senator
- Aulus Plautius, Roman politician
- Aulus Plautius (consul 1 BC) (c. 44 BC – 1st century AD), Roman politician
- Quintus Plautius, Roman senator
- Gaius Plautius Decianus, Roman general
- Publius Plautius Hypsaeus, Roman politician
- Gaius Plautius Proculus, Roman consul
- Publius Plautius Rufus, Roman person
- Marcus Plautius Silvanus (consul 2 BC), Roman politician
- Gaius Plautius Venox, Roman statesman
- Marcus Plautius Silvanus (praetor 24), Roman senator
- Tiberius Plautius Silvanus Aelianus, Roman patrician
- Lucius Plautius Lamia Silvanus (c. 110 – aft. 145), Roman senator
- Lucius Titius Plautius Aquilinus, Roman senator
- Marcus Peducaeus Plautius Quintillus (died 205), Roman noble
- Lucius Aelius Lamia Plautius Aelianus (c. 45 – 81/96), Roman senator
- Quintus Hedius Lollianus Plautius Avitus (fl. late 2nd to early 3rd century AD), Roman military officer

== See also ==
- Plautia gens
