= Lucius Papirius Crassus (consul 336 BC) =

4th century BC Roman consul, general and dictator

Lucius Papirius Crassus was a Roman politician. He was appointed dictator in 340 BC, and consul in 336 BC and 330 BC. Lucius Papirius was from the Papiria gens (family) in Rome.

== Dictatorship of 340 BC ==
Lucius Papirius Crassus was appointed dictator in 340 BC by Titus Manlius Torquatus after the death of Publius Decius Mus in the Battle of Vesuvius and the failing health of Titus Manlius Torquatus. Following his appointment as dictator, Lucius Papirius Crassus appointed his relative Lucius Papirius Cursor as his Master of Horse. The people of Antium soon began conducting raids against the farmlands of Ostia, Ardea, and Solonium but no significant advantages were gained by Lucius Papirius against these people.

== First Consulship of 336 BC ==
Four years after serving as dictator, Lucius Papirius was elected consul along with Caecilius Duilius in 336 BC. This year is noted mostly for a war between Rome and the Ausones. The Ausones, a people inhabiting the city of Cales, had joined forces with their allies and neighbors the Sidicini to oppose the Romans. The Romans defeated the Ausones and the Sidicini in a battle of little importance and forced them into flight.

After achieving victory against the Ausones and Sidicini in the field, Lucius Papirius and Caecilius Duilius decided to not actively pursue their defeated foes back to their cities and destroy them. The Senate, however, having an extreme distaste for the Sidicini people for constantly pursuing hostilities against Rome in the past, were slighted by the decision of their consuls to allow the Sidicini to retreat. Therefore, the next year the Senate elected Marcus Valerius Corvus, a renowned military commander, to deal with the Sidicini in a way that the previous consuls had not.

== Second Consulship of 330 BC ==
In 330 BC Lucius Papirius was elected to a second consulship with Lucius Plautius Vennox. At the beginning of the consuls' term Volscian envoys arrived in Rome from Fabreteria and Lucania. These envoys sought Roman protection from Samnite incursions and declared that if Rome helped to protect them, they would submit to Roman rule. Lucius Papirius and Lucius Plautius accepted these requests for protection and warned the Samnites to cease incursions against the Volscians. The Samnites, not being prepared for a war, ceased their incursions at once.

During 330 BC, a war began with Privernum and their allies, the people of Fundi. The commander of the Privernates, Vitruvius Vaccus, was a citizen of Fundi and well known in his own land as well as in Rome. He even had a house in Rome on the Palatine Hill, which was torn down and renamed Vaccus' Meadows. While Vitruvius was conducting widespread raiding expeditions in the lands of Setia, Norba, and Cora, Lucius Papirius set out to oppose him and dug in near Vitruvius' camp. Vitruvius did not defend himself with a rampart against a stronger opponent and, without any plan or commitment, had deployed his battle lines. His men constantly looked behind as if to see a possibility of flight rather than thinking of engaging the enemy. Lucius Papirius defeated Vitruvius decisively and with little effort but Vitruvius took few casualties. This was due in part to the confined space of the battleground and Vitruvius' camp being nearby. As darkness fell Vitruvius' forces made their way back to Privernum in a column formation. Lucius Plautius Vennox at this time was travelling from Privernum to the territory of Fundi where he laid waste to the farmland there. The senate of Fundi moved to meet Lucius Plautius to plead for peace and a pardon for Vitruvius. In exchange for peace Fundi would submit to Roman authority. These terms were accepted by Lucius Plautius and Fundi became a Roman province with Roman citizenship being given to all citizens inhabiting the territory. The Senate of Rome, however, believed that the people of Fundi would not remain loyal and did not ratify the terms of the peace. Yet the people of Fundi had no future quarrel with the Romans and were absorbed into Roman territory. While Privernum was under siege from both of the consular armies, one of the consuls was recalled to Rome to hold consular elections.

In the year prior to Lucius Papirius' consulship, Alexander I of Epirus had led an expedition in southern Italy. During this expedition Alexander of Epirus was killed in Pandosia.

== Late life ==
Not much is known about Lucius Papirius Crassus' late life, but it is known that in 325 BC he was appointed as Master of Horse by Lucius Papirius Cursor. Lucius Papirius Crassus was also given command of the city of Rome, which infuriated the former Master of Horse, Quintus Fabius.

Political offices
Preceded by Gaius Sulpicius Longus, and Publius Aelius Paetus	Consul of the Roman Republic; 336 BC with Kaeso Duillius	Succeeded by Marcus Atilius Regulus Calenus, and Marcus Valerius Corvus IV
Preceded by Gaius Valerius Potitus, and Marcus Claudius Marcellus	Consul of the Roman Republic; 330 BC with Lucius Plautius Venno (or Venox)	Succeeded by Lucius Aemilius Mamercinus Privernas II, and Gaius Plautius Decianus
