= Caeso Duilius =

4th-century BC Roman general and statesman

Caeso Duilius (fl. c. 336 – 334 BC) was a Roman general and statesman. As consul in 336 BC, he and his colleague in office, Lucius Papirius Crassus, waged war against the Ausoni and Sidicini. In 334 BC, Duilius was the member of a three-man board to establish a colony at Cales, which Rome had conquered the previous year. Weigel (p. 226) notes that Duilius is the first attested plebeian member of a colonial commission.

Preceded by Gaius Sulpicius Longus; Publius Aelius Paetus	Roman consul 336 BC; With: Lucius Papirius Crassus	Succeeded by Marcus Atilius Regulus Calenus; Marcus Valerius Corvus
