= Lucius Aemilius Mamercinus Privernas =

4th-century BC Roman consul

Lucius Aemilius Mamercinus Privernas (Latin: Lucius Aemilius L. f. L. n. Mamercinus Privernas) was a Roman statesman who served as the consul in 341 and 329 BC, Magister Equitum in 342, Dictator in 335 and 316, and Interrex in 326.

== Family ==
Lucius Aemilius was the son of Lucius Aemilius Mamercinus, consul in 366 and 363. He belonged to the gens Aemilia, one of the oldest patrician families of Ancient Rome.

== Career ==
In 342, during the dictatorship of Marcus Valerius Corvus, Aemilius served as Magister Equitum. The following year he was elected to his first consulship with Gaius Plautius Venox Hypsaeus. Gaius Plautius led his troops to victories in Priverno and Volsci, while Lucius Aemilius travelled to Samnium where he received the region's ambassadors who demanded peace. The praetor laid the petition of the Samnites before the Senate, and the Senators voted to renew the treaty with them.

After the peace was accepted by the Roman Senate, Lucius Aemilius left Samnium. The Roman army was at once recalled, after receiving a year's pay and rations for three months, which the consul had stipulated should be the price of a truce, to last until the envoys should return. According to Livy, Aemilius was encouraged by his colleagues to resign before the end of his term of office because of the impending Latin War.

In 335 he was appointed dictator (dictator comitiorum habendorum causa). In 329 Aemilius was again elected to the consulship alongside Gaius Plautius Decianus. There was great alarm at Rome at this time because of a report that the Gauls were marching southward. Accordingly, while Decianus proceeded against Privernum, which was continuing to resist the Romans, Lucius Aemilius began to levy a large army in order to oppose the Gauls. However, the report of the Gaulish invasion proved to be unfounded, so both consuls united their forces against Privernum. The town was taken and Mamercinus, as well as his colleague, obtained a triumph as a result. The capture of this town must have been regarded as a very glorious achievement since Mamercinus received the surname of Privernas.

In 326 he was selected as interrex. In 316 he again served as dictator (dictator rei gerundae causa). His primary mission as dictator was to fight the Samnites.

== Bibliography ==
- Livy, Ab urbe condita libri, 8.1 and 8.2
- William Smith, Dictionary of Greek and Roman Biography and Mythology, vol. II, Boston, Little, Brown, and Company, 1867.

Political offices
Preceded by Quintus Servilius Ahala III and Gaius Marcius Rutilus IV	Consul of the Roman Republic; 341 BC with Gaius Plautius Venox Hypsaeus	Succeeded by Titus Manlius Torquatus III and Publius Decius Mus
Preceded by Lucius Papirius Crassus II and Lucius Plautius Venox	Consul of the Roman Republic; 329 BC with Gaius Plautius Decianus	Succeeded by Publius Plautius Proculus and Publius Cornelius Scapula
