= Ponte Lucano =

Bridge in Italy

Coordinates: 41.9549°N 12.7618°E

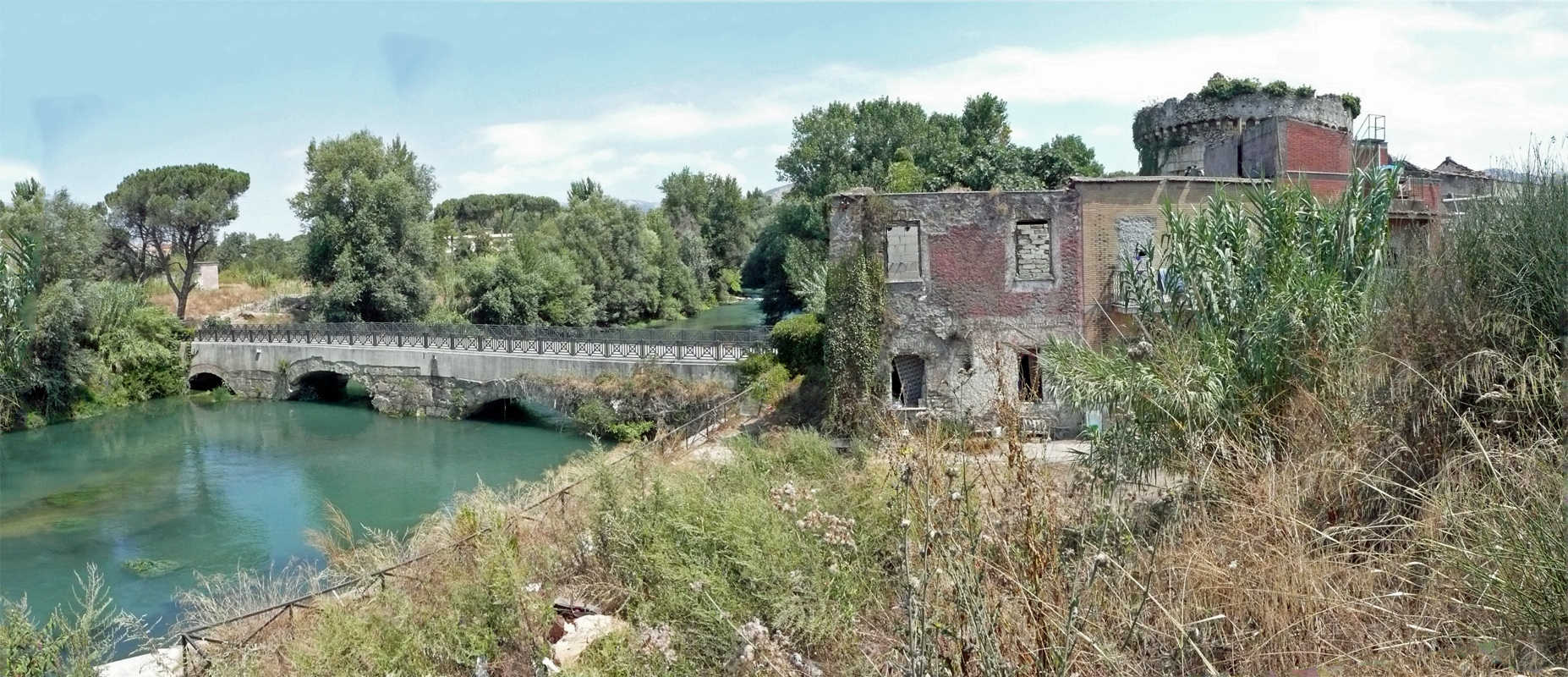
Ponte Lucano

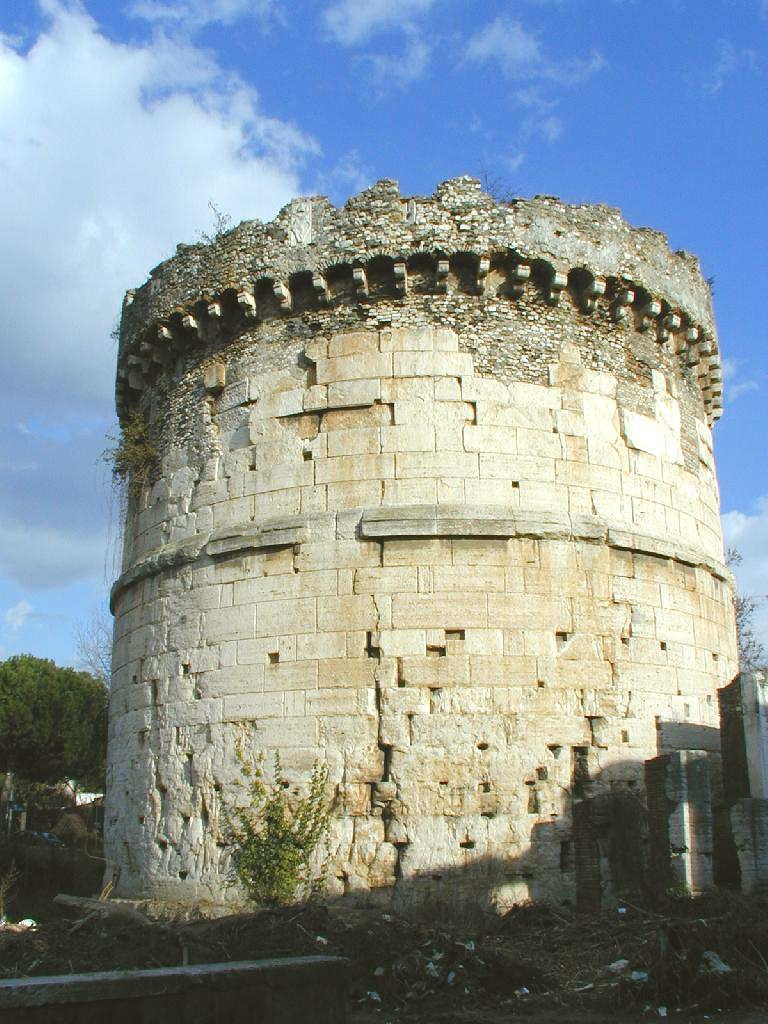
Tomb of the Plautii

The Lucano bridge (in Italian: ponte Lucano) is a Roman stone bridge over the Aniene river in the Province of Rome, Italy, on the via Tiburtina. Coming from the direction of Rome, the bridge is found after Tivoli Terme and before Hadrian's Villa. This bridge was part of the project for the most endangered monuments of the World Monuments Fund for the year 2010.

== History ==
The bridge which dates to the first century BC crosses the Aniene in the vicinity of Tibur (Tivoli) and consists of seven stone arches which carried traffic on the via Tiburtina up to the 20th century. In modern times the road was rerouted a little further north over a new bridge.

The archeological site also includes the mausoleum of the Plautii, a great round tower on the south bank of the river, that dates to the first century BC, and the ruins of an inn dating from the 15th century. The Plautii were an illustrious Roman family who counted amongst its members Gaius Plautius Proculus, Gaius Plautius Venox and Marcus Plautius Silvanus. One of the inscriptions found on the tower include the following text that indicates that Marcus Plautius Lucanus and Tiberius Claudius Nero built the bridge at the fourteenth mile of the Via Tiburtina:

M PLAVTIVS | M F ANIEN | LVCANVS | TI. CLAVDIVS | TI. F PAL. | NERO. AED. CVR | PR. CENS. TTVIR. V | M. XIV

== Restoration works ==
The ensemble of monuments has survived centuries relatively intact, but is in dire need of repairs. In 2004, during flooding of the Aniene, due in part to the blockage caused by illegal industrial dumping, the decision was taken to restore these monuments and to integrate them progressively into a more welcoming setting.

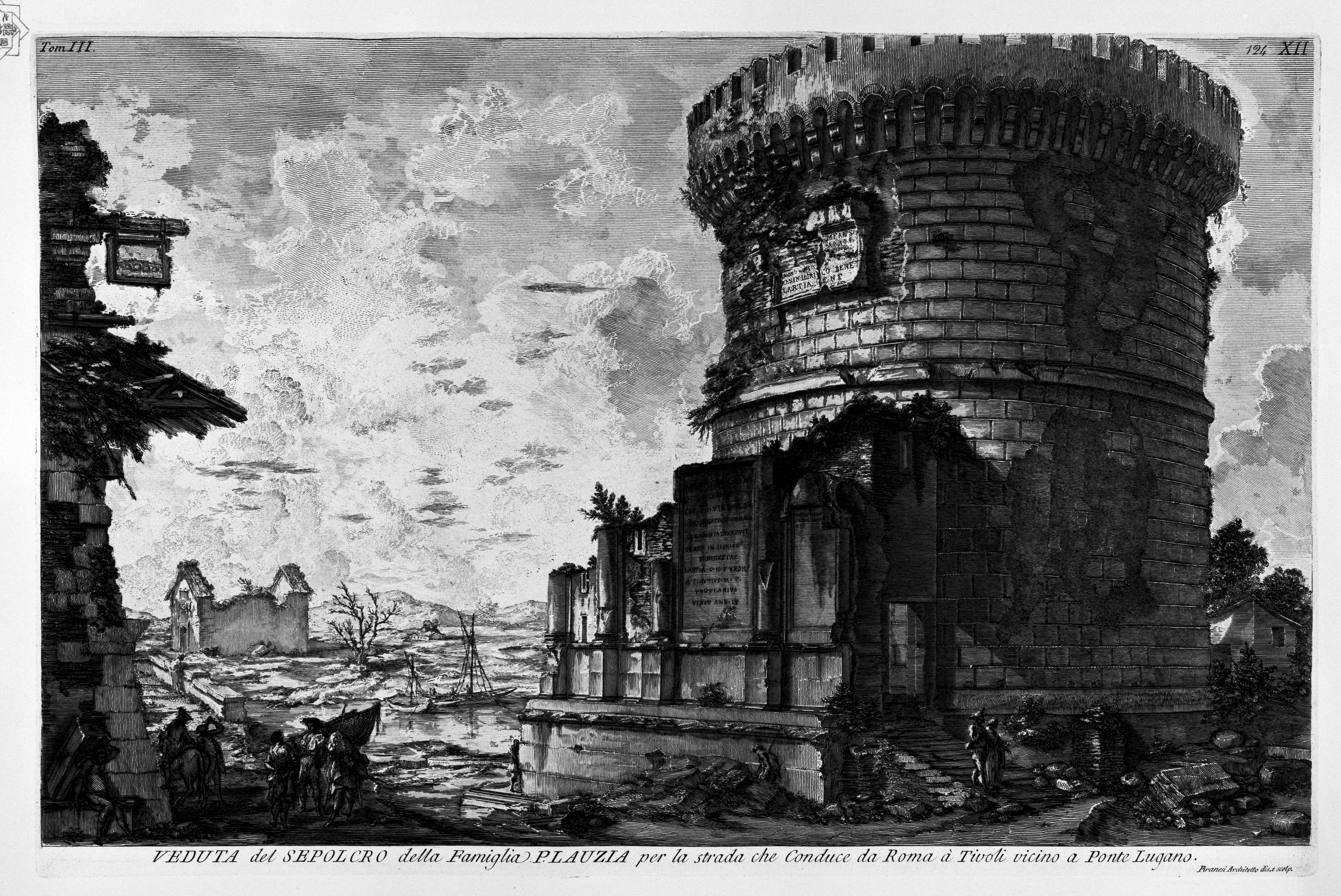
Tomb of the Plautii, engraving by Piranesi, 1756

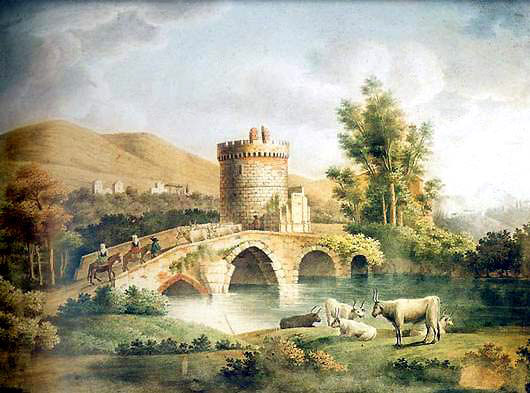
Pont Lucano and the mausoleum of the Plautii, oil on canvas (1880), Pietro Della Valle (1827–1891)
