= Latin War =

4th-century BC conflict between the Roman Republic and neighboring Latin peoples of Italy

- Part of the Roman expansion in Italy and the Roman–Latin wars
- Italy in 4th century BC
Date	341/340– 338 BC (Note: The Romans customarily dated events by noting the consuls who held office that year. The Latin War broke out in the year that Titus Manlius Imperiosus Torquatus and Publius Decius Mus were consuls and ended in the year that Lucius Furius Camillus and Gaius Maenius were consuls. When converted to the western calendar using the traditional Varronian chronology, those years become 340 and 338 BC. However, modern historians have shown that the Varronian chronology dates the Latin War four years too early because of inclusion of unhistorical "dictator years". Despite that known inaccuracy, the Varronian chronology remains in use by convention also in academic literature and so is also the chronology used in this article. Forsythe(2005), pp. 369-370)
Location	Latium, Campania,
Result	Roman victory, dissolution of Latin League

Belligerents
Roman Republic; Samnites	Latin League; Campanians; Volsci; Sidicini; Aurunci

Commanders and leaders
Publius Decius Mus; Titus Manlius Imperiosus; Gaius Maenius	Unknown

The (Second) Latin War of 340–338 BC was a conflict between the Roman Republic and its neighbors, the Latin peoples of ancient Italy. It ended in the dissolution of the Latin League and incorporation of its territory into the Roman sphere of influence, with the Latins gaining partial rights and varying levels of citizenship.

== Sources ==
The most comprehensive source on the Latin War is the Roman historian Livy (59 BC – AD 17), who narrates the war in the eighth book of his history of Rome, Ab urbe condita. Two other substantial narratives have also survived, a fragment from the Roman Antiquities of Dionysius of Halicarnassus (c. 60 BC–after 7 BC), a Greek contemporary of Livy, and a summary by the 12th century Byzantine chronicler Joannes Zonaras based on the Roman history of Cassius Dio (AD 150 – 235). Modern historians consider the ancient accounts of the Latin War to be a mixture of fact and fiction. All the surviving authors lived long after the Latin War and relied on the works of earlier writers. Several of the historians used by Livy experienced the Social War (91–88 BC) between Rome and its Italian allies and seem to have interpreted the Latin War in the terms of that war, which may have introduced anachronistic elements into the historical record.

== Background ==
The Latins did not have any central government, but were divided into a number of self-governing towns and cities with a shared language, culture and some legal and religious institutions. In the 5th century BC, these city-states had formed a mutual military alliance, the Foedus Cassianum, primarily to resist the raids and invasions of two neighbouring peoples, the Aequi and the Volsci. As the largest Latin city, Rome naturally enjoyed a leading position in this alliance. By the early 4th century BC, the Latins were no longer threatened by invasions, but instead feared an increasingly powerful Rome. Several wars between Rome and other Latins, now often found fighting beside their former enemies the Volsci, are recorded for the first half of the 4th century. In the end, the Latins and the Volsci could not prevent Rome from establishing control over the ager Pomptinus (the territory of the Pomptine Marshes and the Monti Lepini) and in 381 annexing the Latin town of Tusculum. The threat of Gallic invasion seems to have convinced at least some Latin towns to resume their treaty with Rome in 358, but these did not include Tibur and Praeneste, Rome's chief opponents among the Latins, who only made peace with Rome in 354 after a lengthy war. During the 340s, Roman-Latin relations seem to have worsened again. Livy records that, in 349, when again faced with a Gallic invasion, the Latins refused to supply their share of troops, and in 343 actually planned to attack Rome, but following news of Roman victories against the Samnites instead decided to attack the Paeligni.

The Samnites were a tribal federation living in the central Apennines. In 354, they had formed a treaty of friendship with Rome, probably fixing the river Liris as the border between their respective spheres of influence, but despite this treaty, in 343 the First Samnite War broke out between Rome and the Samnites over the control of Campania. According to Livy, this war originated in Samnite attacks on a smaller tribe, the Sidicini. Unable to resist, the Sidicini appealed to the Campanians, who were led by the famously wealthy city-state of Capua, but these were also defeated and the Samnites invaded Campania. At this point the Campanians decided to surrender themselves unconditionally into the power of Rome, following which the Romans felt compelled to intervene to protect their new subjects against Samnite attacks. Modern historians are in some dispute whether this surrender really took place or was invented to absolve Rome of treaty breaking, but generally agree that Rome formed some kind of alliance with Capua.

The First Samnite War ended in 341 with a negotiated peace and renewal of the former treaty between Rome and the Samnites. Rome retained her Campanian alliance, but accepted that the Sidicini belonged to the Samnite sphere. According to Livy, once peace with Rome had been concluded, the Samnites attacked the Sidicini with the same forces they had deployed against Rome. Facing defeat, the Sidicini tried to surrender themselves to Rome, but their surrender was rejected by the senate as coming far too late. The Sidicini then turned to the Latins who had already taken up arms on their own account. The Campani joined the war as well, and led by the Latins a large army of these allied peoples invaded Samnium. Most of the damage they dealt there to the Samnites was done by raiding rather than fighting, and although the Latins got the better in their various encounters with the Samnites, they were happy to retire from enemy territory and fight no further. The Samnites sent envoys to Rome to complain and demand that if the Latins and Campani really were subject peoples of Rome, Rome should use her authority over them to prevent further attacks on Samnite territory. The Roman senate gave an ambiguous reply, being both unwilling to acknowledge that they could no longer control the Latins and afraid of alienating them further by ordering them to stop their attacks on the Samnites. The Campani had surrendered to Rome and must obey her will, however there was nothing in Rome's treaty with the Latins preventing them from going to war against whomever they wanted. The result of this reply was to completely turn the Campani against Rome and encourage the Latins to take action. In the guise of preparing a Samnite war, the Latins plotted in secret with the Campani for war against Rome. However, news of their plans got out, and at Rome the sitting consuls for 341 were ordered to leave office before the expiry of their term, so that the new consuls could enter office early in preparation for the major war that was brewing. The consuls elected for 340 were Titus Manlius Torquatus, for the third time, and Publius Decius Mus. The annually elected consuls were the chief magistrates of the Roman Republic, and responsible for commanding Rome's armies in times of war.

Modern historians have not put much credence in these events supposed to have taken place following the end of the First Samnite War, believing them to be largely invented. There are several similarities with the events supposed to have started the Samnite War, the Samnites are once again at war with the Sidicini and a surrender offer is made to Rome, and this duplication is unlikely to be historical. This time the surrender is refused, showing the moral superiority of the Roman senate. The supposed secret plotting between the Latins and Campani are also likely to be inventions, inspired by similar secret talks held by the Italians before the outbreak of the Social War, news of which were also leaked to the Romans.

== Outbreak ==
=== Ancient account ===
Livy writes that when the Romans learnt of the Latins' secret talks with the Campanians they sent for the ten leading men among the Latins to come to Rome and receive instructions, pretending to be concerned for the Samnites. At this time, the Latins had two praetors, Lucius Annius of Setia and L. Numisius of Circeii, both colonies. Through their efforts, the colonies of Signia and Velitrae and also the Volsci were convinced to take up arms against Rome. As there could be no doubt what the real reasons for summoning these men to Rome were, the Latins held a council meeting to decide what their leaders should reply to the questions they expected the Romans to ask. At the meeting, Annius complained that Rome was treating the Latins as subjects rather than allies and proposed that the Latins should demand that henceforth one consul and half the senate should be elected from among the Latins, and so give Latins and Romans an equal share in the government. This measure was adopted and Annius was appointed spokesman for the Latins. The Roman senate received the Latin delegation in an audience in the temple of Jupiter Optimus Maximus on the Capitoline Hill, where they advised the Latins not to make war on the Samnites with whom the Romans had a treaty. In a speech to the senate, Annius presented the demands of the Latins to which he received a furious reply from the consul, T. Manlius Torquatus. Livy writes that, according to tradition, while the senators were invoking the gods as guardians of their treaties with the Latins, Annius was heard dismissing the divine power of the Roman Jupiter. However, when storming out of the temple, Annius slipped on the stairs and was knocked unconscious in the fall, or, according to some, killed. When Torquatus saw Annius lying there, he vowed to strike down the armies of the Latins just as the gods had struck the Latin envoy. This speech was wildly cheered by the people of Rome and war was declared.

=== Modern view ===
Modern historians consider Livy's account of the outbreak of the Latin War unhistorical fiction, filled with invented speeches written, as was common practice among ancient historians, so as to present the arguments of both sides. There is a general resemblance between the rhetoric of the speeches Livy has written for L. Annius and the complaints and demands made by Rome's Italian allies in the years before the Social War. Several of the writers Livy is known to have used for Roman history during the 4th century lived through the Social War, and it would have been natural for them to see parallels between the Latin War and contemporary events. Like the Roman senate rejected an embassy from the Italian insurgents in 90 BC, so the Latin embassy of 340 BC is also rejected. Later, in his account of the Second Punic War, Livy mentions that some of his sources claimed that the Capuans, after the Battle of Cannae, had similarly sent an embassy and demanded to receive an equal share in the government of the Roman Republic. He, however, rejected this as a duplication of the demands made by the Latins at the outbreak of the Latin War. Modern historians do not believe that the Latins made any demand for a consul and half the senate in 340. It is possible that Capua really did so in 216, but most likely Livy was correct to consider this a duplicate of accounts of the Latin War. Instead, they have proposed that historically these were political demands made by the Italians at the outbreak of the Social War. However, no ancient attestations of such demands exist today. By the early 1st century BC, Rome had risen to become the dominant power in the Mediterranean and Roman citizenship was a highly desired favour. However, such sentiments are considered anachronistic for the 4th century. In 340, Rome was still only a local power in Latium, but whose aggressiveness and recent expansion into Campania was an increasing threat to the independence of the smaller Latin communities who risked becoming entirely surrounded by Roman territory. Rather than being caused by the Roman refusal to share their government with the other Latins, the Latin War was a final bid by the Latins to preserve their own independence. In this endeavour they were joined by the Volsci, who were in much the same situation as the Latins, and the Campani, Sidicini and Aurunci, three peoples who all risked being squeezed between the growing powers of Central Italy, Rome and the Samnites.

== South-Eastern campaign 340 BC ==
The Latins entered Samnium; the Roman-Samnite army moved to the Fucine Lake, then, avoiding Latium, entered the Campanian territory and attacked the Latins and Campanians near Mount Vesuvius. In the Battle of Vesuvius, the Romans, under consuls Decius Mus and T. Manlius Torquatus Imperiosus, defeated the Latins. According to Roman sources, Manlius reinstated army discipline by executing his son for his unintentional disobedience, while Decius sacrificed his own life to the gods for the Roman victory.

== Roman subjugation of the Latins and the Volsci 339–338 BC ==
One year later, Manlius defeated the Latins at the Battle of Trifanum. The Latins were finally defeated in 338 BC at the Battle of Pedum on the river Astura, where Gaius Maenius commanded the Roman naval forces which defeated the combined Latin armies of Antium, Lanuvium, Aricia and Velitrae.

== Political aftermath ==
The Latins, forced to leave Campania, moved to Latium, where they put up a long yet unsuccessful resistance against the Roman forces. The defeated Latin peoples were obliged to recognize Roman suzerainty. Some of the Latin towns were Romanized, others became partially Roman, adopting Roman magistratures, while some others became Roman colonies.

== See also ==
- Roman-Latin wars
