= Plautia gens =

Ancient Roman family

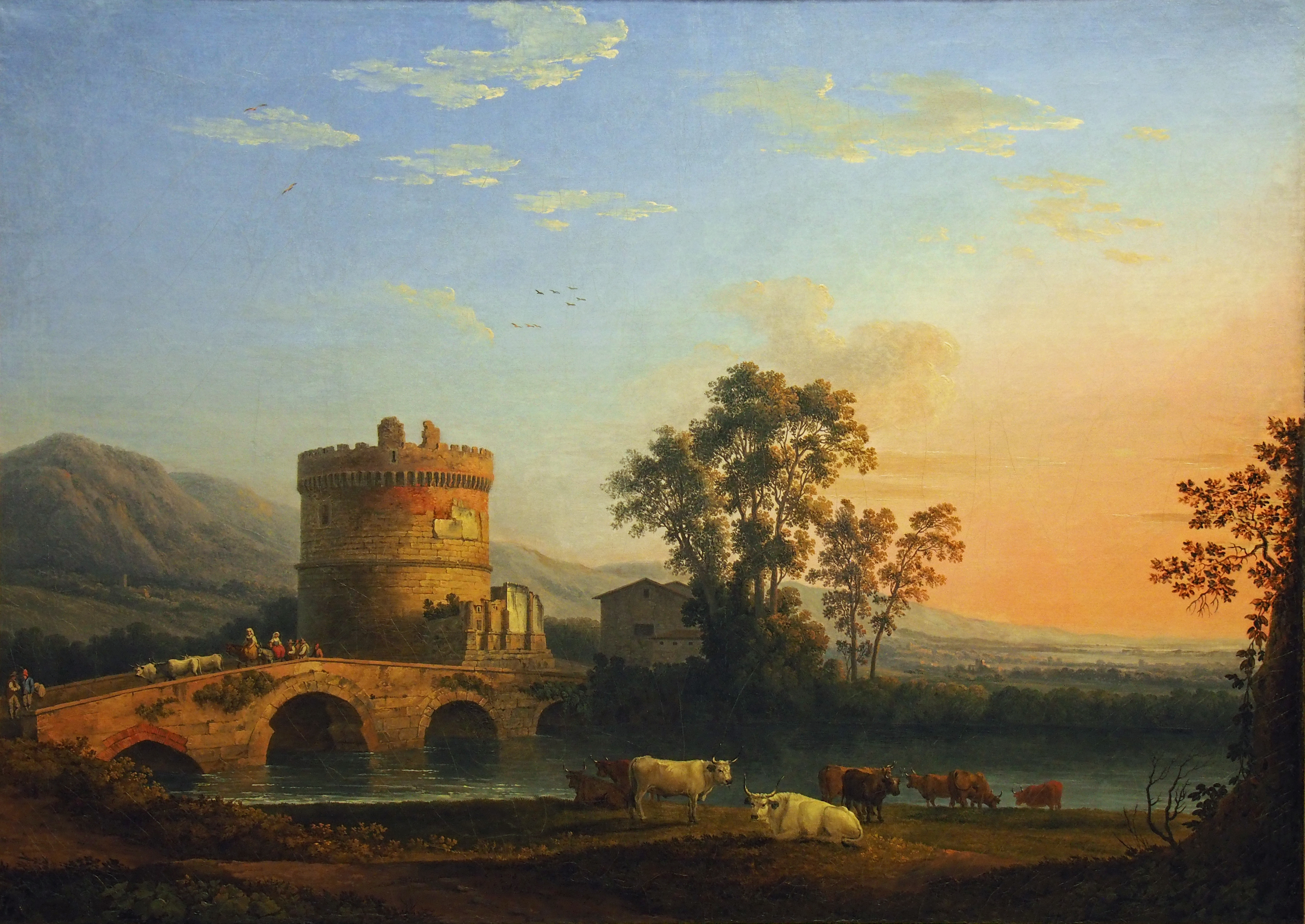
Tomb of the Plautii and the Ponte Lucano, on the via Tiburtina by Tivoli (ancient Tibur). Jacob Philipp Hackert (1780).

The gens Plautia, sometimes written Plotia, was a plebeian family at ancient Rome. Members of this gens first appear in history in the middle of the fourth century BC, when Gaius Plautius Proculus obtained the consulship soon after that magistracy was opened to the plebeian order by the Licinio-Sextian rogations. Little is heard of the Plautii from the period of the Samnite Wars down to the late second century BC, but from then to imperial times they regularly held the consulship and other offices of importance. In the first century AD, the emperor Claudius, whose first wife was a member of this family, granted patrician status to one branch of the Plautii.

== Origin ==
The Plautii of the later Republic claimed descent from Leucon, the son of Neptune and Themisto, the daughter of Hypseus, King of the Lapiths. The coins minted by Publius Plautius Hypsaeus depict Neptune and Leucon.

The nomen Plautius is derived from the common Latin surname Plautus, flat-footed. Chase classifies the name among those gentilicia that were either native to Rome, or which occurred there and cannot be shown to have originated anywhere else. However, other scholars have suggested that they may have come from a region near to Privernum, a city of southern Latium. Several of the early Plautii appearing in the Fasti consulares carried on war against the Privernates.

== Praenomina ==
The earlier Plautii mainly used the praenomina Lucius and Gaius, and occasionally Publius and Marcus. The later Plautii employed different names, mainly Aulus, Quintus, Marcus and Tiberius.

== Branches and cognomina ==
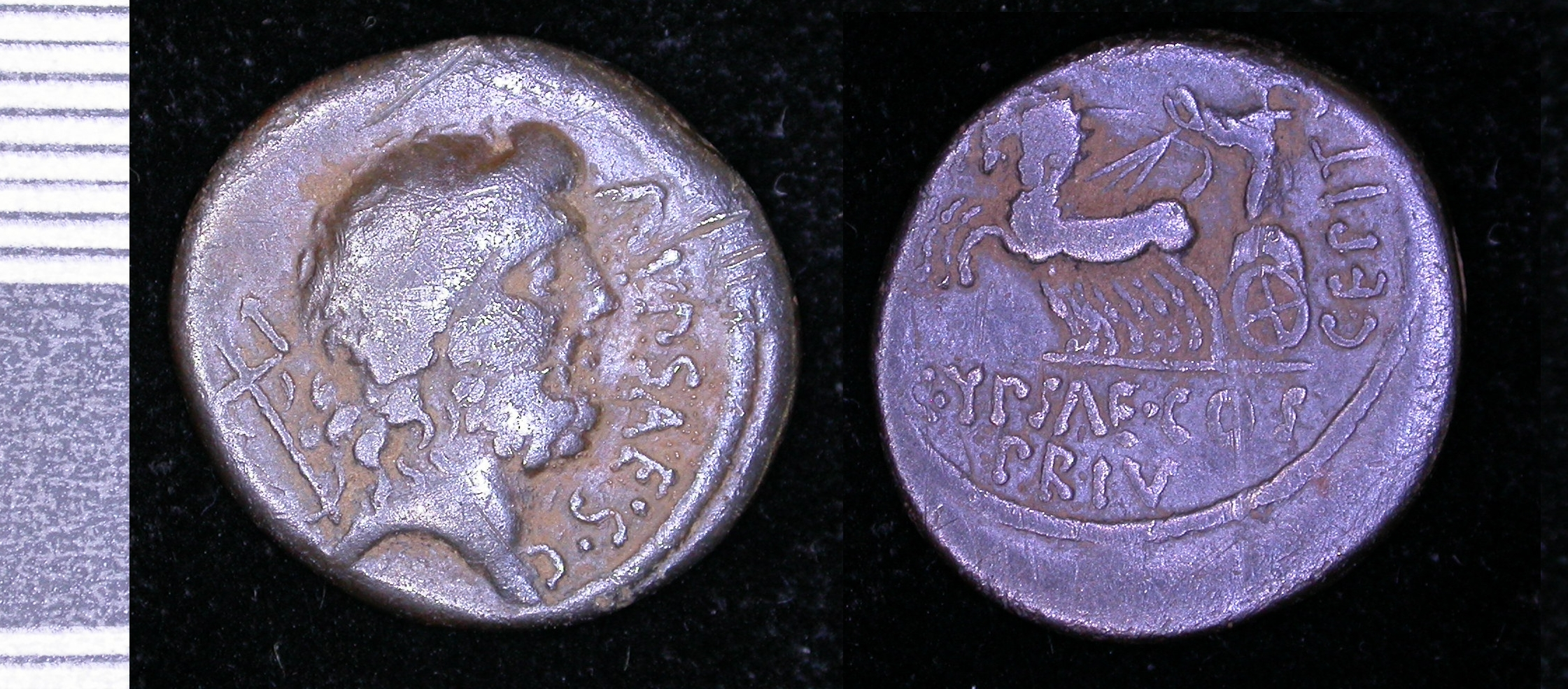
Denarius issued by Publius Plautius Hypsaeus in 60 BC. The obverse features a head of Neptune, while the reverse depicts the triumph of Gaius Plautius Decianus after his capture of Privernum.

The only distinct family of the Plautii during the middle Republic bore the cognomen Venno or Venox, a hunter. Frontinus describes a story, in which Gaius Plautius, censor in 312 BC, obtained the cognomen Venox by discovering the springs that fed the Aqua Appia, Rome's first aqueduct. However, Venno occurs before this, and appears more often in the fasti. The first of this family to obtain the consulship bore the additional cognomen Hypsaeus, later spelled Ypsaeus on coins, which was evidently a personal cognomen, as it does not appear again for over a century, when this name replaces the older Venno.

Proculus, which occurs as the cognomen of the first Plautius to obtain the consulship, also seems to have been a personal cognomen; it is not apparent whether this Plautius was part of the same family as the Vennones. Proculus was an old praenomen, which the Roman antiquarians supposed to have been given to a child born when his father was far from home, although morphologically it seems to be a diminutive of Proca, a name occurring in Roman mythology as one of the Kings of Alba Longa.

Later Plautii were entangled in the affairs of the imperial family during the first century, this branch first appears in the later years of the Republic, and flourished until the time of Nero. They often bore the praenomen Aulus. This was the family of Aulus Plautius, the first Roman governor of Britain. Many members also wore the cognomen Silvanus, originally referring to one who dwells in the forest. The imperial Plautii of the late second century may have been descended from one of these families through marriage, but were apparently descended from the Titii in the male line, and used Plautius because of its greater dignity.

Many of the Plautii bore no cognomen; these seem to have used the alternative spelling, Plotius, more than the others.

== Members ==
This list includes abbreviated praenomina. For an explanation of this practice, see filiation.

- Publius Plautius, the grandfather of Gaius Plautius Proculus, consul in 357 BC.
- Publius P. f. Plautius, the father of Gaius Plautius Proculus.
- Gaius Plautius P. f. P. n. Proculus, consul in 358 BC, defeated the Hernici, and was honoured with a triumph. In 356, he was magister equitum to Gaius Marcius Rutilus, the first plebeian dictator.
- Gaius Plautius P. f. P. n. Decianus, consul in 329 BC, undertook the war with Privernum, and captured the city, for which he received a triumph. He was censor in 312, with Appius Claudius Caecus. At the expiration of the traditional term of eighteen months, Decianus resigned his office, but Claudius refused to do the same, remaining in office as sole censor for the ancient term of five years.

=== Plautii Vennones et Hypsaei ===
- Lucius Plautius Venno, the grandfather of the consul of 347 and 341 BC.
- Lucius Plautius L. f. Venno, the father of the consul of 347 and 341 BC.
- Gaius Plautius L. f. L. n. Venno Hypsaeus, consul in 347 BC, and again in 341. In the latter year he defeated the Privernates, and forced a withdrawal of the Volsci, whose land he plundered.
- Lucius Plautius L. f. L. n. Venno, consul in 330 BC, fought against the Privernates and the Fundani.
- Lucius Plautius L. f. L. n. Venno, consul in 318 BC, received the hostages sent by Teate and Canusium, two towns in Apulia.
- Gaius Plautius C. f. C. n. Venox, censor in 312, with Appius Claudius Caecus. At the expiration of the traditional term of eighteen months, Plautius resigned his office, but Claudius refused to do the same, remaining in office as sole censor for the ancient term of five years.
- Lucius Plautius Hypsaeus, praetor in 189 BC, obtained the province of Hispania Citerior.
- Lucius Plautius Hypsaeus, triumvir monetalis between 194 and 190 BC, probably the son of Lucius Plautius Hypsaeus, praetor in 189 BC.
- Gaius Plautius Hypsaeus, praetor in 146 BC, was assigned the province of Hispania Ulterior. He was severely defeated twice by Viriathus, and forced into exile after returning to Rome.
- Lucius Plautius (L. f.) Hypsaeus, praetor in Sicily during the First Servile War, was defeated by the slaves. Broughton tentatively places his praetorship in 139 BC.
- Marcus Plautius Hypsaeus, consul in 125 BC, was appointed to redistribute portions of the ager publicus that had been illegally occupied. Cicero criticizes Plautius' understanding of the law.
- Gaius Plautius C. f. Hypsaeus, triumvir monetalis in 121 BC. His coins bear the inscription Pluti, the only instance of this spelling.
- Marcus Plautius Hypsaeus, praetor or propraetor in Asia in an uncertain year before 90 BC, and perhaps a legate under Sulla. He might be the same Plautius who took his own life on returning from Asia, only to learn of the death of his wife, Orestilla.
- Publius Plautius Hypsaeus, an ally of Gnaeus Pompeius, under whom he had served as quaestor. He was a candidate for the consulship in 54 BC, but at the trial of Titus Annius Milo, Hypsaeus' slaves confessed under torture that he had committed bribery in order to win election, and he was banished.

=== Plautii Silvani ===
- Aulus Plautius, father of the ambassador in Crete in 113 BC.
- Quintus Plautius A. f., a senator and ambassador in Crete in 113 BC. He very likely belonged to this branch as his praenomen and that of his father, Aulus, are only found among them.
- Aulus Plautius (Varus), tribune of the plebs in 70 BC, and legate in Sicily and the Adriatic Sea under Pompey in 67. The cognomen Varus found in Appian is probably a mistake. He might have been the same as Aulus Plautius, tribune of the plebs in 56 BC, or his father.
- Marcus Plautius Silvanus, tribune of the plebs in 89 BC, passed a law which granted Roman citizenship to all the Italian allies, and another which limited the number of equestrian jurors in the courts. He was probably the brother of Aulus the legate in Sicily.
- Aulus Plautius, tribune of the plebs in 56 BC, curule aedile in 55, praetor urbanus in 51, and subsequently propraetor of Bithynia and Pontus. He was a friend of Cicero and supported Pompey. He also minted coins during his aedileship.
- Aulus Plautius, proconsul of Cyprus circa 22/21 BC. Probably the son of the tribune of the plebs in 56 BC.
- Marcus Plautius A. f. Silvanus, husband of Urgulania, probably son of the tribune of the plebs in 56 BC.
- Aulus Plautius A. f., consul suffectus in 1 BC. He married a Vitellia. Probably son of the proconsul of Cyprus.
- Marcus Plautius M. f. A. n. Silvanus, consul in 2 BC. Son of Silvanus and Urgulania.
- Marcus Plautius M. f. M. n. Silvanus, praetor in AD 24, was condemned to death for having murdered his second wife, Apronia. His first wife, Fabia Numantina, was charged with having caused his insanity through the use of witchcraft, but was acquitted. Eldest son of the consul of 2 BC and Lartia.
- Publius Plautius M. f. M. n. Pulcher, quaestor in 31, son of the consul of 2 BC and Lartia.
- Aulus Plautius Urgulanius, died at the age of 9. Son of the consul of 2 BC and Lartia.
- Plautia M. f. M. n. Urgulanilla, the first wife of Claudius. Daughter of the consul of 2 BC and Lartia.
- Plautia A. f. A. n., married Publius Petronius. Probably the daughter of the consul of 1 BC and Vitellia.
- Aulus Plautius A. f. A. n., consul suffectus from the Kalends of July in AD 29, was subsequently sent by Claudius to invade Britain, and conquered the southern part of the island, becoming its first governor. He was granted an ovation on his return in 47, and shown great favour by the emperor. Probably the son of the consul of 1 BC and Vitellia.
- Quintus Plautius A. f. A. n., consul in AD 36. Probably the son of the consul of 1 BC and Vitellia. He probably married a Sextia Laterana.
- Plautius Q. f. A. n. Lateranus, one of the paramours of the empress Messalina, he was pardoned by Claudius out of respect for his famous uncle. Consul elect for AD 66, he participated in the conspiracy of Piso, and was put to death, bravely refusing to reveal the names of his fellow conspirators. Probably the son of the consul of 36 AD and Sextia.
- Plautia, possible wife of Lucius Antistius Vetus, probably the daughter of the consul of 36 AD and Sextia.
- Plautia, speculative daughter of the governor of Britain and wife of Titus Flavius Sabinus
- Aulus Plautius, a young man put to death by Nero. Probably the son of Plautius Pulcher.
- Tiberius Plautius M. f. M. n. Silvanus Aelianus, consul suffectus from the Kalends of March to the Kalends of July in AD 45. In 74, he was chosen consul for the second time, replacing Vespasian on the Ides of January, and serving with Titus until the Ides of May. Probably the adoptive son of the convicted murderer.
- Plautia Laterana, wife of Publius Quinctilius Varus the Younger. Probably the daughter of the consul elect of 66 AD.
- Lucius Aelius Lamia Plautius Ti. f. M. n. Aelianus, consul suffectus in AD 80, replacing Domitian on the Ides of January, and serving until the Kalends of March. Son of the suffect consul Tiberius Silvanus.
- Plautia A. f. Quinctilia, wife of Publius Helvidius Priscus (son of the consul). She may have been the daughter of Aulus Plautius who was put to death by Nero.
- Plautia [...]lacuna, daughter of the suffect consul Tiberius Silvanus.
- Plautia, wife of Lucius Ceionius Commodus, Gaius Avidius Nigrinus and Sextus Vettulenus Civica Cerialis. Possibly a daughter of Plautius Aelianus the consul of 80 AD.
- Plautia (or Aelia), possible mother of Lucius Fundanius Lamia Aelianus. Possibly a daughter of Plautius Aelianus the consul of 80 AD.

=== Others ===
- Publius Plautius Rufus
- Novius Plautius, a skilled metalworker, who probably lived about the middle of the third century BC. Many of his caskets have been found at Praeneste.
- Plautius, a comic poet. According to Varro, he was frequently confused with Plautus, to whom his comedies were mistakenly attributed.
- Lucius Plotius Gallus, came to Rome from Cisalpine Gaul circa 88 BC, to establish the first school for Latin and rhetoric. He was very influential on the development of Roman rhetoric, and authored arguments for some of the leading advocates of his day. He was highly regarded by the young Cicero.
- Marcus Plotius, one of Caesar's envoys to the proconsul Lucius Cornelius Lentulus Crus in 48 BC, who urged him to leave Pompeius, but to no effect.
- Lucius Plautius Plancus, born Gaius Munatius Plancus, but adopted by one of the Plautii. He was the brother of Lucius Munatius Plancus, consul in 42, Titus Munatius Plancus Bursa, a partisan of Marcus Antonius, and Gnaeus Munatius Plancus, praetor in 43. (Note: The Realencyclopädie der classischen Altertumswissenschaft, followed by Broughton, makes Gaius Munatius Plancus the same as Gnaeus Munatius Plancus, praetor in 43 BC, who would otherwise be his brother. However, this identification is very uncertain, as the only sources that name the praetor call him Gnaeus, while the only sources that name the proscribed Plancus call him Gaius or Lucius.) Plautius was proscribed by the triumvirs, and gave himself up to preserve the lives of his slaves, who were being tortured to reveal his hiding place.
- Plotius Numida, fought in the Cantabrian Wars. His safe return to Italy was celebrated by his friend, the poet Horace, in one of his odes.
- Gaius Plautius Rufus, one of the triumviri monetalis during the time of Augustus. He may be the same person as the conspirator.
- Plotius Tucca, a friend of the poets Horace and Virgil. Virgil named him one of his heirs, to whom he gave his unfinished writings, including the manuscript of the Aeneid.
- Plautius Rufus, one of those who conspired against Augustus. He may be the same as Gaius Plotius Rufus.
- Plotius Firmus, one of Otho's allies, who rose from humble beginnings to become praetorian prefect. He successfully quelled a mutiny through a combination of personal charisma and bribery, and encouraged the emperor to be brave and trust in his army.
- Plotius Griphus, one of Vespasian's supporters, appointed praetor in AD 70.
- Plautius, a notable jurist, who must have lived about the time of Vespasian.
- Plautius Quintillus, consul in AD 159, married Ceionia Fabia, the sister of Lucius Verus.
- Lucius Titius Plautius Aquilinus, consul in AD 162.
- Marcus Peducaeus Plautius Quintillus, consul in AD 177, with his brother-in-law, Commodus. He was an augur, and one of Commodus' trusted advisors, but escaped the wrath of his successors until 205, when Septimius Severus ordered his death.
- Plautius M. f. Quintillus, son of Marcus Peducaeus Plautius Quintillus, and nephew of Commodus.
- Plautia Servilia, daughter of Quintillus, and niece of Commodus.
- Marius Plotius Sacerdos, a late Latin grammarian, probably belonging to the fifth or sixth centuries, and the author of De Metris Liber, originally the third part of a treatise on grammar.

== See also ==
- List of Roman gentes

== Bibliography ==
- Marcus Tullius Cicero, De Oratore, Epistulae ad Atticum, Epistulae ad Familiares, Pro Flacco, Pro Plancio.
- Gaius Julius Caesar, Commentarii de Bello Civili (Commentaries on the Civil War).
- Diodorus Siculus, Bibliotheca Historica (Library of History).
- Marcus Terentius Varro, De Lingua Latina (On the Latin Language).
- Quintus Horatius Flaccus (Horace), Odes, Satirae (Satires).
- Dionysius of Halicarnassus, Romaike Archaiologia (Roman Antiquities).
- Titus Livius (Livy), History of Rome.
- Gaius Julius Hyginus, Fabulae.
- Marcus Velleius Paterculus, Compendium of Roman History.
- Valerius Maximus, Factorum ac Dictorum Memorabilium (Memorable Facts and Sayings).
- Lucius Annaeus Seneca (Seneca the Elder), Controversiae.
- Quintus Asconius Pedianus, Commentarius in Oratio Ciceronis Pro Milone (Commentary on Cicero's Oration Pro Milone).
- Gaius Plinius Secundus (Pliny the Elder), Historia Naturalis (Natural History).
- Marcus Fabius Quintilianus (Quintilian), Institutio Oratoria (Institutes of Oratory).
- Sextus Julius Frontinus, De Aquaeductu (On Aqueducts).
- Publius Cornelius Tacitus, Annales, Historiae, De Vita et Moribus Iulii Agricolae (On the Life and Mores of Julius Agricola).
- Plutarchus, Lives of the Noble Greeks and Romans.
- Gaius Suetonius Tranquillus, De Vita Caesarum (Lives of the Caesars, or The Twelve Caesars), De Claris Rhetoribus (On the Eminent Orators).
- Phlegon of Tralles, Peri Thaumasion (The Book of Marvels).
- Lucius Annaeus Florus, Epitome de T. Livio Bellorum Omnium Annorum DCC (Epitome of Livy: All the Wars of Seven Hundred Years).
- Lucius Flavius Arrianus (Arrian of Nicomedia), Epicteti Diatribae (Discourses of Epictetus).
- Appianus Alexandrinus (Appian), Hispanica (The Spanish Wars), Bella Mithridatica (The Mithridatic Wars), Bellum Civile (The Civil War).
- Aulus Gellius, Noctes Atticae (Attic Nights).
- Lucius Cassius Dio Cocceianus (Cassius Dio), Roman History.
- Aelius Donatus, Vita Virgilii (The Life of Vergil).
- Julius Obsequens, Liber de Prodigiis (The Book of Prodigies).
- Eusebius Sophronius Hieronymus (St. Jerome), In Chronicon Eusebii (The Chronicon of Eusebius).
- Digesta, or Pandectae (The Digest).
- Scholia Bobiensia (Bobbio Scholiast), In Ciceronis Pro Archia Poëta (Commentary on Cicero's Oration Pro Archia Poëta), In Ciceronis Pro Milone (Commentary on Cicero's Oration Pro Milone).
- Guilielmus Grotius, De Vitae Jurisconsultorum (Lives of the Jurists), Felix Lopez, Brittenburg (1690).
- Abraham Wieling, Jurisprudentia Restituta, seu Index Chronologicus in Totum Juris Justinianaei Corpus (Jurisprudence Restored, or a Chronological Index to the Whole Code of Justinian), Abraham van Paddenburgh, Utrecht (1739).
- Johann Joachim Winckelmann, Geschichte der Kunst des Alterhums (The History of Art in Antiquity, 1764).
- Joseph Hilarius Eckhel, Doctrina Numorum Veterum (The Study of Ancient Coins, 1792–1798).
- Sigmund Wilhelm Zimmern, Geschichte des Römischen Privatrechts bis Justinian (History of Roman Private Law to Justinian), J. C. B. Mohr, Heidelberg (1826).
- Poëtarum Latinorum Reliquiae (Surviving Works of Latin Poets), August Weichert, ed., B. G. Teubner, Leipzig (1830).
- Karl Otfried Müller, Handbuch der Archäologie der Kunst (Handbook of Ancient Art, or Ancient Art and its Remains), 3rd ed., J. Leitch, trans., London (1847).
- Dictionary of Greek and Roman Biography and Mythology, William Smith, ed., Little, Brown and Company, Boston (1849).
- Theodor Mommsen et alii, Corpus Inscriptionum Latinarum (The Body of Latin Inscriptions, abbreviated CIL), Berlin-Brandenburgische Akademie der Wissenschaften (1853–present).
- Wilhelm Dittenberger, Sylloge Inscriptionum Graecarum (Collection of Greek Inscriptions, abbreviated SIG), Leipzig (1883).
- René Cagnat et alii, L'Année épigraphique (The Year in Epigraphy, abbreviated AE), Presses Universitaires de France (1888–present).
- August Pauly, Georg Wissowa, et alii, Realencyclopädie der Classischen Altertumswissenschaft (Scientific Encyclopedia of the Knowledge of Classical Antiquities, abbreviated RE or PW), J. B. Metzler, Stuttgart (1894–1980).
- George Davis Chase, "The Origin of Roman Praenomina", in Harvard Studies in Classical Philology, vol. VIII (1897).
- Henry H. Armstrong, "Privernum", in American Journal of Archaeology, Second Series, vol. XV, pp. 44–59, The Macmillan Company, New York (1911).
- T. Robert S. Broughton, The Magistrates of the Roman Republic, American Philological Association (1952–1986).
- Lily Ross Taylor, ''Trebula Suffenas and the Plautii Silvani'', Memoirs of the American Academy in Rome, Vol. 24 (1956), pp. 7+9–30.
- Michael Crawford, Roman Republican Coinage, Cambridge University Press (1974, 2001).
- Paul A. Gallivan, "The Fasti for the Reign of Claudius", in Classical Quarterly, vol. 28, pp. 407–426 (1978), "The Fasti for A.D. 70–96", in Classical Quarterly, vol. 31, pp. 186–220 (1981).
- Ronald Syme, The Augustan Aristocracy, Clarendon Press (1989).
- Ancient Greece and Rome, Michael Gagarin and Elaine Fantham, eds., Oxford University Press, (2010).
- Nicola Terrenato, "Private Vis, Public Virtus: Family Agendas during the Early Roman Expansion", in Roman Republican Colonization New Perspectives from Archaeology and Ancient History, Tesse D. Stek and Jeremia Pelgrom, eds., Papers of the Royal Netherlands Institute in Rome (2014).
