= Marcus Fulvius Paetinus =

Roman consul in 299 BC

Marcus Fulvius Paetinus was a Roman politician born in Capua, Roman Republic. He came from the patrician Fulvii gens. He was elected as consul in the year 299 BC.

== Early career ==
He became the head of his family and a member of the Mercantile Faction in the Roman Senate. In 304 BC, he had been appointed Governor of Magna Graecia, in southern Italy. His responsibilities would increase as the Roman Republic incorporated more and more areas in southern Italy due to the conquest of the Samnite Wars, and other foes.

== Consulship ==
He was elected as consul in 299 BC along with Titus Manlius Torquatus who died mid-tenure and was replaced by Marcus Valerius M.f. Corvus. Under Paetinus, Narni became a Roman municipality. He received a triumph in 299 BC.

== See also ==
- List of Roman consuls

Political offices
| Preceded by Marcus Valerius M.f. Corvus, and Quintus Appuleius Pansa | Consul of the Roman Republic; 299 BC with Titus Manlius Torquatus | Succeeded by Lucius Cornelius Cn.f. Scipio Barbatus, and Gnaeus Fulvius Cn.f. Maximus Centumalus |
