= Battle of Trifanum =

Battle in 340 BC

- Part of the Roman-Italic Wars
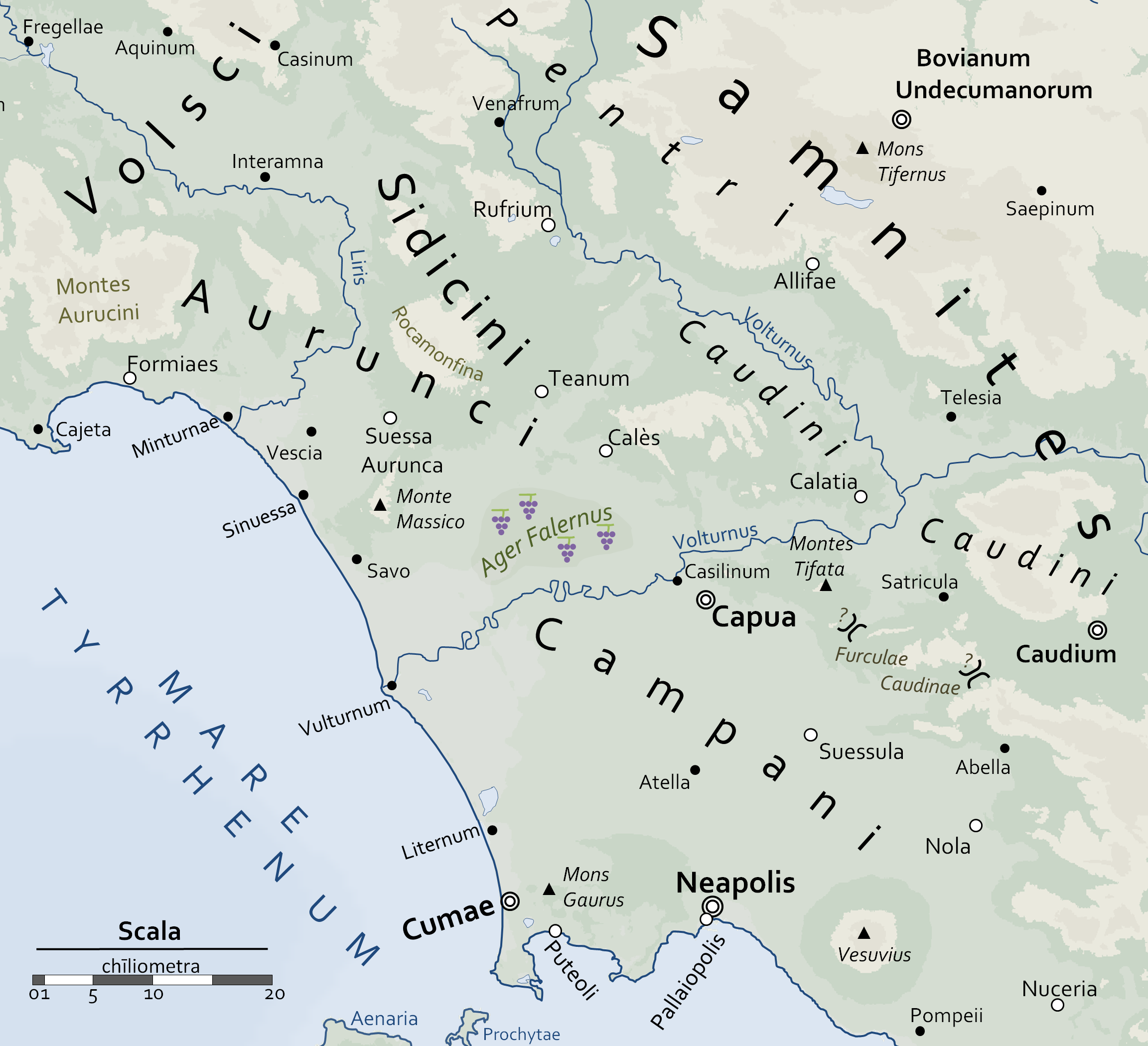
Date	340 BC
Location	unidentified, in Caserta province, Italy
Result	Roman victory

Belligerents
Roman Republic	Latins

Commanders and leaders
Manlius Imperiosus	Unknown

The Battle of Trifanum was fought in 340 BC between the Roman Republic and the Latin League. The Roman force was led by Manlius Imperiosus. He pursued the Latins to the north following the Battle of Vesuvius and met them at Trifanum near the mouth of the Liri River. Livy records that the two forces dumped their baggage and fought where they met. He claimed that the Romans were victorious and that their victory was so crushing that afterwards, when the consul entered Latium, the Latins immediately surrendered. As the war continued for another two years it may be that the Latins were surprised at Trifanum and dispersed.
