= Titus Manlius Torquatus (consul 299 BC) =

Ancient Roman politician

Titus Manlius T.f. Torquatus (died 299 BC) was a patrician Roman Republican consul for 299 BC, elected along with a plebeian co-consul Marcus Fulvius Cn.f. Paetinus.

== Family background ==
The Manlii were one of the oldest and most distinguished patrician gens in the Roman Republic. One Gnaeus Manlius Cincinnatus had been chosen consul in 480 BC, four years after the first Fabius had become consul. Prominent consuls in the family included the early 4th century consul Marcus Manlius T.f. Capitolinus (whose career was marked by his gens banning the use of the praenomen Marcus thereafter), and the 4th century consul Titus Manlius L.f. Imperiosus Torquatus. Titus was descended from this last consul, notable not only for his military successes but also for executing his own son for an impetuous breach of military discipline. It is not clear if the consuls Aulus Manlius Torquatus Atticus, consul in 244 BC and 241 BC, and Titus Manlius Torquatus, consul in 235 BC and 224 BC and censor in 231 BC, were his sons or other relatives.

== Death ==
According to Livy, Titus Manlius died of a fall from his horse, while preparing his troops to march into Etruria:

The province of Etruria fell by lot to the consul Titus Manlius; who, when he had but just entered the enemy's country, as he was exercising the cavalry, in wheeling about at full speed, was thrown from his horse, and almost killed on the spot; three days after the fall, he died. (Livy V:11)

Some historians such as Julie Andrew and E. T. Salmon have questioned the historicity of the event, and argue that Manlius may have simply died fighting the Gauls and Etruscans in the area.

== See also ==
- List of Roman consuls

Political offices
Preceded by Marcus Valerius M.f. Corvus, and Quintus Appuleius Pansa	Consul of the Roman Republic; 299 BC with Marcus Fulvius Cn.f. Paetinus	Succeeded by Lucius Cornelius Cn.f. Scipio Barbatus, and Gnaeus Fulvius Cn.f. Maximus Centumalus
