= Marcus Valerius Corvus =

4th-century BC Roman general and statesman

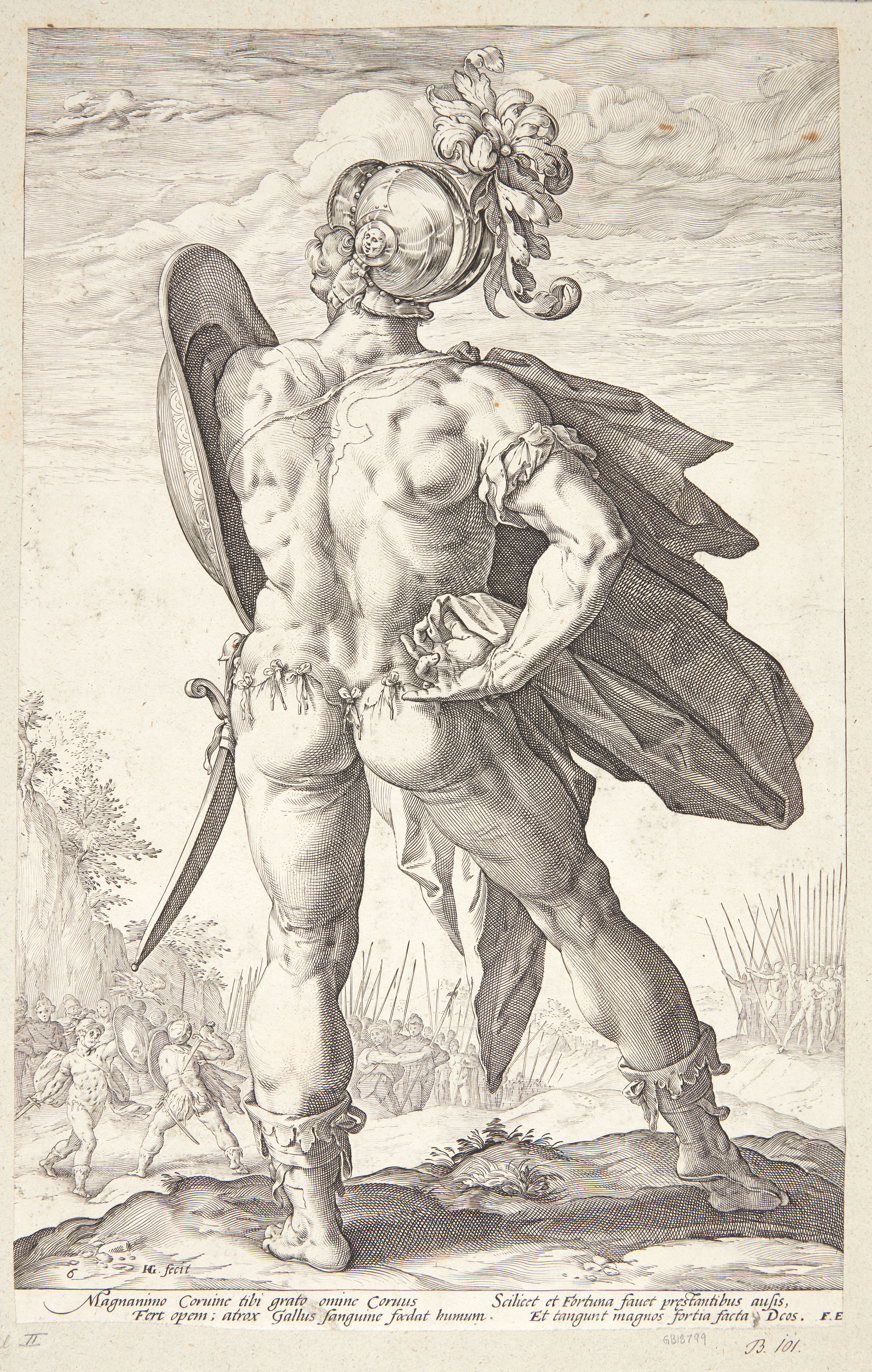
16th century print of Marcus Valerius Corvus by Hendrick Goltzius

Marcus Valerius Corvus (c. 370–270 BC), also sometimes known as Corvinus, was a military commander and politician who served in the early-to-middle period of the Roman Republic. During his career he was elected consul six times, beginning at the age of twenty-three. He was appointed dictator twice and led the armies of the Republic in the First Samnite War. He occupied the curule chair twenty-one times throughout his career. According to legend, he lived to the age of one hundred.

== Early career ==
A member of the patrician gens Valeria, Valerius first came to prominence in 349 BC when he served as a military tribune under the consul Lucius Furius Camillus, who was on campaign against the Gauls of northern Italy. According to tradition, prior to one battle a huge Gallic warrior challenged any Roman to single combat. Valerius, who asked for and gained the consul's permission, accepted. As the two approached each other, a raven settled on Valerius's helmet and distracted the enemy by flying at his face, allowing Valerius to kill his enemy. The two armies then fought, resulting in a rout of the Gallic forces and a victory for the Romans. As a reward for his courage, Valerius received a gift of ten oxen and a golden crown, as well as the agnomen Corvus (the Latin word for "raven").

Regardless of the story's veracity, after this victory Corvus' popularity soared. He was elected consul in absentia in 348 BC at the unusually young age of 22. During his tenure, a treaty was made between Rome and Carthage. In the subsequent year Corvus was likely elected to the office of praetor, followed by his second consulship in 346 BC. On campaign he defeated the Antiates and the Volsci, sacking and destroying the town of Satricum apart from the temple of Mater Matuta. For these victories, the Senate awarded Corvus his first triumph.

== First and Second Samnite Wars ==
Corvus served as curule aedile in 345 BC before his military abilities saw his election to the consulship for the third time in 343 BC. That year saw the outbreak of the First Samnite War, in which Corvus won victories at the Battle of Mount Gaurus and the Battle of Suessula. After the latter victory, Corvus had some 40,000 shields and 170 enemy standards piled before him on the battlefield. Corvus then returned to Rome to celebrate his second triumph. He then returned to the southern war front in wintertime to protect Campania from Samnite incursions.

The year 342 BC was one of crisis for the Roman state, with the Roman legions stationed around Capua, as well as the surrounding Campanian towns, rebelling and marching on Rome. In response, Corvus was appointed dictator to deal with the mutineers. Meeting them at the head of an army some eight miles outside of Rome, he negotiated instead of fighting a battle. Using his past association with the army to gain their trust, he reached an agreement. Corvus pushed through laws (the ne cui militum fraudi secessio fuit) which granted the mutinous soldiers immunity from prosecution, prevented the removal of a soldier's name from the roll of service without his consent, and prohibited any military tribune being demoted to the rank of centurion. He however refused to agree to the lowering of the rate of pay for the cavalrymen, and to the immediate execution of the decemviri. It was also alleged that, during the troubles that brought about the passage of the leges genuciae, Corvus suggested that the Senate agree to the plebeian demands for the abolition of all debts; this was rejected out of hand. Historians such as Gary Forsythe and S. P. Oakley consider the alleged events of the mutiny to be later literary inventions, although the laws passed in that year are accurate.

Corvus was elected consul for a fourth time in 335 BC, once again in response to an escalating military situation in Italy. The Sidicini had formed an alliance with the Ausones of Cales, and the Senate intended to send someone with a proven military record. In a break with tradition, the consuls did not cast lots for their provinces; the Senate instead assigned the area around Cales directly to Corvus. He successfully besieged and stormed the town; after its capture, the Romans established a colony of 2,500 men. For this victory, Corvus was granted a third triumph, and the honor of carrying the agnomen Calenus.

In 332 BC, Corvus was appointed as interrex, a function he again fulfilled in 320 BC. He may also have served as legate under the dictator Lucius Papirius Cursor in 325 BC during the Second Samnite War. In 313 BC he was appointed as one of the triumviri coloniae deducendae, who were given the authority to establish a Latin colony at Saticula. In 312 BC he or his son served as consul with Publius Decius Mus as his colleague. Then in 310 BC he was again named a legate under Lucius Papirius Cursor, and fought in a major battle at Longulae against the Samnites. In 308 BC he was elected praetor for the fourth time as a reward for his services at Longulae. (Note: The dates for Corvus’ second and third praetorships remain unknown. Most likely his second praetorship occurred after 345 BC, while his third occurred before 308 BC.)

== Later career ==
Corvus was appointed dictator for the second time in 302 BC, in response to the revolt of the Marsi at Arretium and Carseoli. Corvus not only defeated the Marsi in battle, but also took the fortified towns of Milionia, Plestina and Fresilia. The Marsi sued for peace, and for his victories over them Corvus was awarded his fourth triumph. He was again appointed dictator in 301 BC, this time to engage in operations against the Etruscans. While Corvus was in Rome taking the auspices, his magister equitum (probably Marcus Aemilius Paullus) was ambushed by the enemy and forced to retreat to his camp, losing a portion of his army. Corvus, quickly coming to his rescue, engaged and defeated the Etruscans in battle, earning an additional triumph. (Note: The accounts of the events of the years 302–301 are contradictory and many of the details are considered very dubious. It is possible that Corvus was only Dictator for one year, and that his battles against the Etruscans a later literary invention. See Oakley, pp. 43–47)

300 BC saw Corvus elected consul for the fifth time. During his year in office he defeated some rebel Aequians and was involved in the passage of two laws. The first was the Lex Ogulnia, which resulted in the opening of the College of Pontifices and the College of Augurs to the plebeians. The second, which he legislated himself, was the expansion of the provocatio, or right of appeal to the people, which now made illegal the use of severe force (specifically killing or lashing by the higher magistrates) within the city of Rome. Then in the following year (299 BC), after the Senate considered appointing him dictator for the fourth time, Corvus was elected suffect consul after the death of Titus Manlius Torquatus, who was in command of the war with the Etruscans. With Corvus' arrival, the Etruscans refused to give battle, but remained within their fortified towns. Although Corvus set entire villages on fire to draw them out, the Etruscans refused to engage him.

After his sixth consulship Corvus retired from public life. He died at the age of 100, around the year 270 BC.

== Character and reputation ==
A man with considerable military talents, Corvus also possessed a kind and amicable nature. Very popular with the soldiers he led into battle and with whom he shared camps, he reportedly competed with them in the athletic games which they played during their leisure time. He was also an enthusiastic supporter of reform, siding with the plebeians during the ongoing Conflict of the Orders. He held that the changing needs of an expanding state required a readjustment of the opportunities provided to plebeians, for the good of Rome.

To later Roman writers, he served as a memorable example of the favors bestowed by Fortuna. A statue of Corvus stood in the Forum of Augustus alongside the statues of other Roman heroes. Nevertheless, annalist Valerius Antias may have exaggerated his list of accomplishments.

== Sources ==
=== Ancient ===
- Livy, The History of Rome

=== Modern ===
- Oakley, S. P., A Commentary on Livy, Books 6–10 Vol. IV (2007)
- Forsythe, Gary, A Critical History of Early Rome from Prehistory to the First Punic War (2005)
- Broughton, T. Robert S., The Magistrates of the Roman Republic, Vol I (1951)
- Smith, William, Dictionary of Greek and Roman Biography and Mythology, Vol I (1867)
- Arnold, Thomas, History of Rome, Vol. II (1840)

Political offices
Preceded by Lucius Furius Camillus; Appius Claudius Crassus Inregillensis	Roman consul 348 BC; With: Marcus Popillius Laenas	Succeeded by Gaius Plautius Venox; Titus Manlius Imperiosus Torquatus
Preceded by Gaius Plautius Venox; Titus Manlius Imperiosus Torquatus	Roman consul II; 346 BC; With: Gaius Poetelius Libo Visolus	Succeeded by Marcus Fabius Dorsuo; Servius Sulpicius Camerinus Rufus
Preceded by Gaius Marcius Rutilus; Titus Manlius Imperiosus Torquatus	Roman consul III; 343 BC; With: Aulus Cornelius Cossus Arvina	Succeeded by Quintus Servilius Ahala; Gaius Marcius Rutilus
Preceded by Lucius Papirius Crassus; Caeso Duilius	Roman consul IV; 335 BC; With: Marcus Atilius Regulus Calenus	Succeeded by Spurius Postumius Albinus; Titus Veturius Calvinus
Preceded by Marcus Livius Denter; Marcus Aemilius Paullus	Roman consul V 300 BC; With: Quintus Appuleius Pansa	Succeeded by Marcus Fulvius Paetinus; Titus Manlius Torquatus
Preceded by Titus Manlius Torquatus	Roman consul VI; 299 BC (suffect); With: Marcus Fulvius Paetinus	Succeeded by Lucius Cornelius Scipio Barbatus; Gnaeus Fulvius Maximus Centumalus
