= Titus Manlius Imperiosus Torquatus =

4th-century BC Roman general and statesman

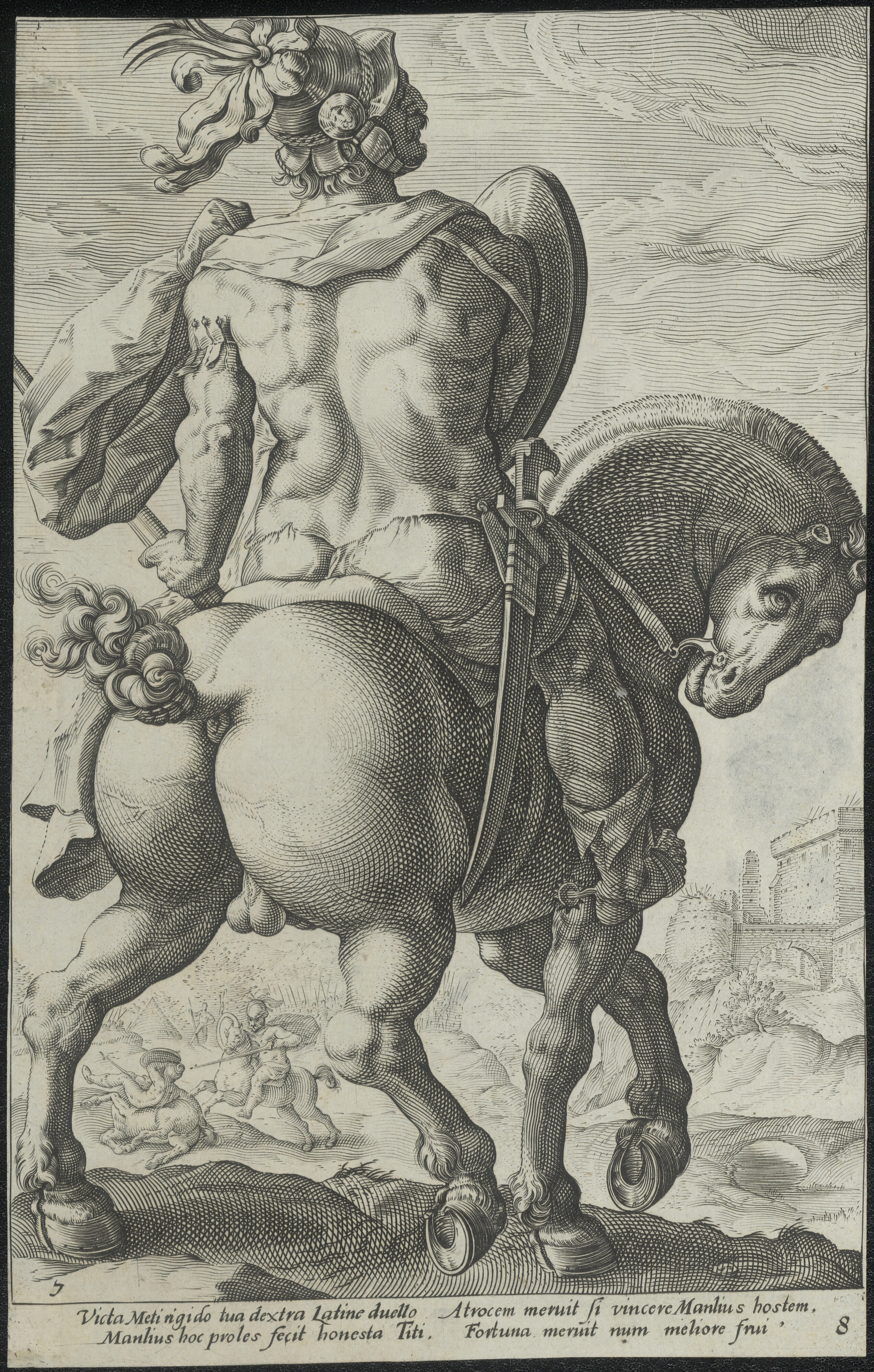
Titus Manlius riding a horse. Engraving by Hendrick Goltzius, c. 1586.

Titus Manlius Imperiosus Torquatus was a famous politician and general of the Roman Republic, of the old gens Manlia. He had an outstanding career, being consul three times, in 347, 344, and 340 BC, and dictator three times, in 353, 349, and 320 BC. He was one of the early heroes of the Republic, alongside Cincinnatus, Cornelius Cossus, Furius Camillus, and Valerius Corvus. As a young military tribune, he defeated a huge Gaul in one of the most famous duels of the Republic, which earned him the epithet Torquatus after the torc he took from the Gaul's body. He was also known for his moral virtues, and his severity became famous after he had his own son executed for disobeying orders in a battle. His life was seen as a model for his descendants, who tried to emulate his heroic deeds, even centuries after his death.

== Career ==
Titus's father Lucius Manlius Capitolinus Imperiosus was appointed dictator in 363 BC in order to fulfil religious duties, but instead undertook preparations for war. This resulted in strong opposition from the plebeian tribunes and he was brought to trial at the beginning of the next year, after he had resigned the dictatorship. Amongst the charges against him was that he had banished Titus from Rome on account of his speaking difficulties and made him work as a labourer. Upon hearing of these accusations against his father, Titus went to the home of the tribune Marcus Pomponius, where he was expected by the latter to provide further charges and was thus promptly admitted. However, once they were alone, he drew his hidden knife and threatened to stab the tribune unless he made a public oath not to hold an assembly to accuse Lucius Manlius, which Pomponius agreed to and duly performed. Titus Manlius' reputation grew on account of his filially pious actions, which helped him to be elected as a military tribune later in the year.

In 361 BC, Titus Manlius fought in the army of Titus Quinctius Poenus Capitolinus Crispinus against the Gauls during the Battle of the Anio River. When a Gaul of enormous size and strength challenged the Romans to single combat, Manlius accepted the challenge with the approval of Poenus after the rest of the army had held back from responding for a long period of time. Despite being physically inferior, he killed the Gaul with blows to the belly and groin, after which he stripped the corpse of a torc and placed it around his own neck. From this, he gained the agnomen Torquatus, a title that was passed down also to his descendants.

In 353 BC, he was named dictator and prepared to attack Caere, but they responded by sending envoys and were granted peace. The campaign was then directed towards the Falisci, but the Roman army found on arrival that the Falisci had disappeared. They ravaged the land but spared the cities before returning to Rome. He was appointed dictator again in 348 BC to oversee elections. A year later, he was elected to his first consulship. His second consulship came in 345 BC.

In 340 BC, when Manlius was consul for the third time, Rome had leadership over the Latin League. It received a delegation from member states headed by Lucius Annius, demanding coequal status in Roman government, such as a place in the senate and a consulship, but Manlius, appealing to Jupiter, refused them. Annius spoke contemptuously of the Roman Jupiter, then lost consciousness and fell down the steps of the public assembly. Interpreting the collapse as divine vengeance, Manlius declared that he would strike down Rome's enemies just as Jupiter had struck down Annius. The Latin embassy required a safe conduct and an escort of magistrates to leave Rome unmolested. Rome realigned itself with the Samnites against the Latins.

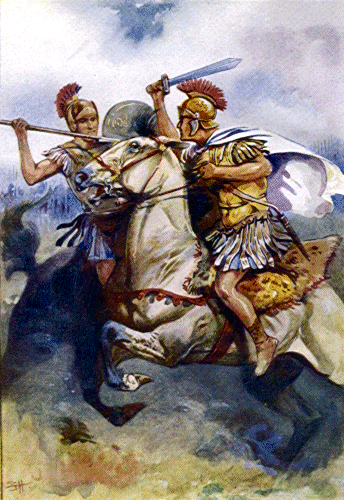
Manlius's son disobeys orders and fights a duel with a Latin warrior. Early 20th century book illustration

During the conduct of the war, Manlius and his co-consul, Publius Decius Mus, decided that the old military discipline would be reinstated, and no man was allowed to leave his post, under penalty of death. Manlius's son, seeing an opportunity for glory, forgot this stricture, left his post with his friends, and defeated several Latin skirmishers in battle. He brought the spoils back to his father, who publicly berated him for disobedience and had him executed. "Manlian discipline" afterwards became an expression for merciless upholding of rules.

After Decius Mus sacrificed himself to achieve victory at the battle of Vesuvius, Manlius was able to crush the Latin allies and pursue them into Campania. He defeated them again at Trifanum, bringing the war to an end, and returned to Rome. He was unable on account of ill health to conduct a further campaign against the Antiates and appointed Lucius Papirius Crassus as dictator to fulfil this role instead.

== Legacy ==
=== In painting ===
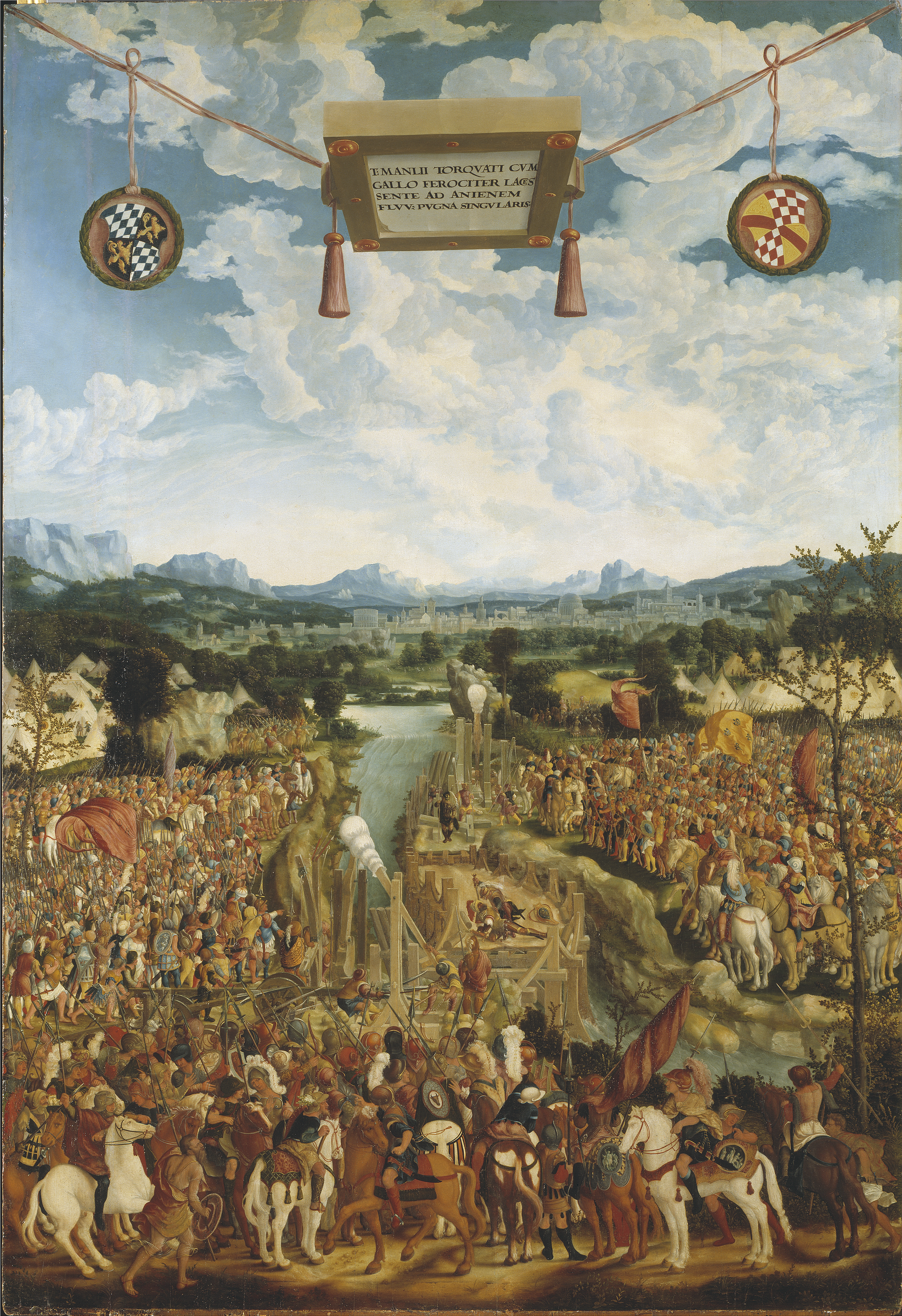
Manlius' duel against the Gaul, a typical battle scene of the Renaissance by the German Ludwig Refinger (mid 16th century).

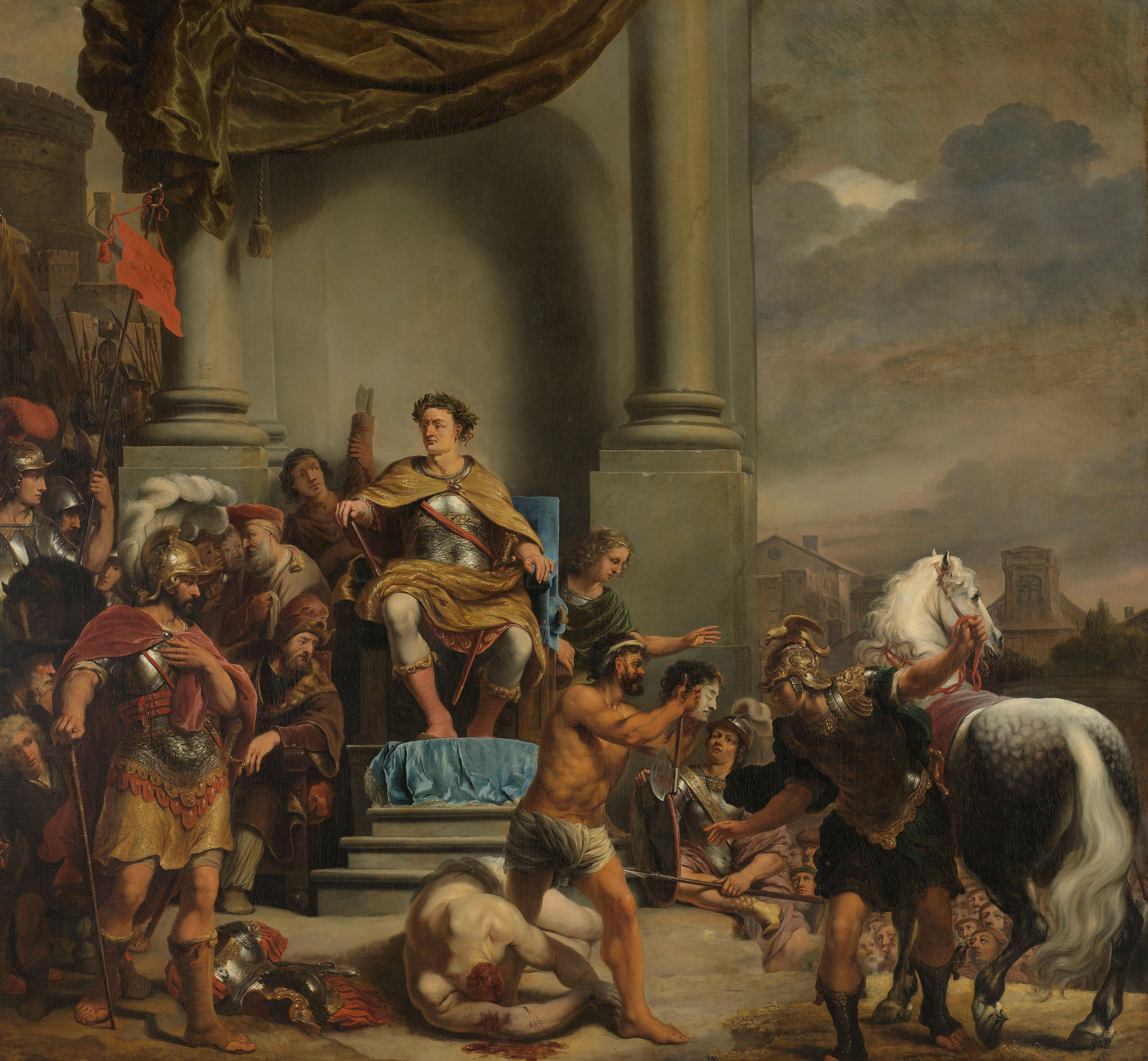
The Dutch Baroque painter Ferdinand Bol depicted the son's decapitation (1661–64).

Sacrifice to the state was one of the favourite themes of French Neoclassical painters at the end of the 18th century and especially during the French Revolution. The story of Torquatus' execution of his son was logically used by several of them.

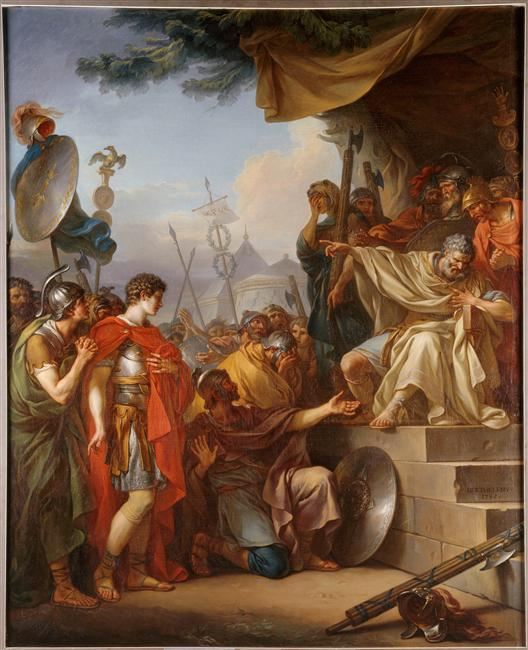
Jean-Simon Berthélemy (1785).

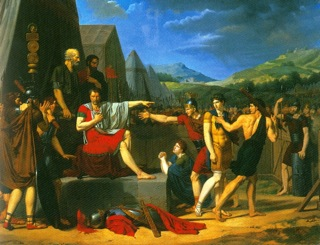
Alphonse Gaudar de Laverdine (1799).

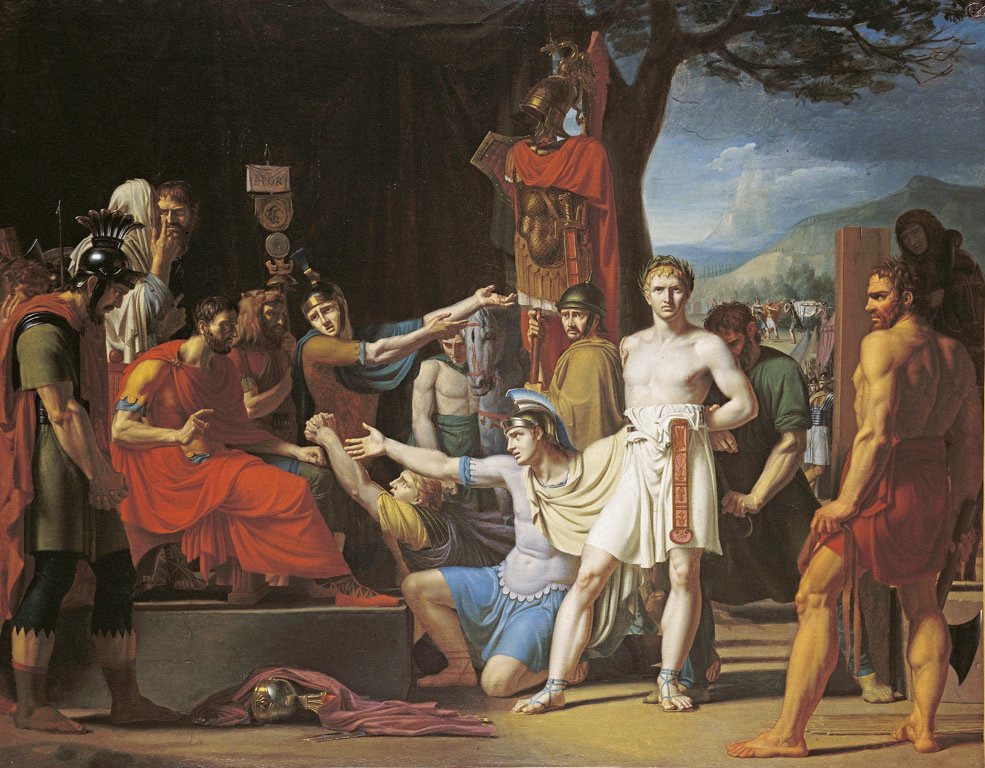
Alexandre-Romain Honnet (1799).

== Stemma of the Manlii Torquati ==
Stemma taken from Münzer until "A. Manlius Torquatus, d. 208", and then Mitchell, with corrections. All dates are BC.

Legend
Orange	Dictator	Yellow	Censor	Green	Consul

T. Manlius; Imperiosus Torquatus dict. 353, 349, 320 cos. 347, 344, 340
T. Manlius Torquatus d. 340
T. Manlius Torquatus cos. 299	L. Manlius Torquatus legate 295
T. Manlius Torquatus
T. Manlius Torquatus	A. Manlius Torquatus; Atticus cens. 247; cos. 244, 241
T. Manlius Torquatus cos. 235, 224 cens. 231; dict. 208
A. Manlius Torquatus d. 208
T. Manlius Torquatus cos. 165	A. Manlius Torquatus cos. 164
T. Manlius Torquatus pr. 137	D. Junius; Silanus Manlianus pr. 141, d. 140
T. Manlius Torquatus	L. Manlius Torquatus qu. circa 113	A. Manlius Torquatus
T. Manlius Torquatus pr. 69	P. Cornelius; Lentulus Spinther (adopted) augur 57	Manlia	L. Manlius Torquatus cos. 65	A. Manlius Torquatus pr. 70
L. Manlius Torquatus pr. 49	A. Manlius Torquatus qu. 43, pontifex	A. Manlius Torquatus	T. Manlius Torquatus

== See also ==
- Manlia gens

== Bibliography ==
=== Ancient works ===
- Titus Livius (Livy), History of Rome.
- Valerius Maximus, Factorum ac Dictorum Memorabilium (Memorable Deeds and Sayings).

=== Modern works ===
- T. Robert S. Broughton, The Magistrates of the Roman Republic, American Philological Association, 1952–1986.
- Michael Crawford, Roman Republican Coinage, Cambridge University Press, 1974–2001.
- Jane F. Mitchell, "The Torquati", in Historia: Zeitschrift für Alte Geschichte, vol. 15, part 1, (January 1966), pp. 23–31.
- Friedrich Münzer, Roman Aristocratic Parties and Families, translated by Thérèse Ridley, Johns Hopkins University Press, 1999 (originally published in 1920).
- August Pauly, Georg Wissowa, et alii, Realencyclopädie der Classischen Altertumswissenschaft (abbreviated PW), J. B. Metzler, Stuttgart (1894–1980).
- Robert Rosenblum, Transformations in Late Eighteenth Century Art, Princeton University Press, 1967.
- Lily Ross Taylor and T. Robert S. Broughton, "The Order of the Two Consuls' Names in the Yearly Lists", Memoirs of the American Academy in Rome, 19 (1949), pp. 3–14.
- F. W. Walbank, A. E. Astin, M. W. Frederiksen, R. M. Ogilvie (editors), The Cambridge Ancient History, vol. VII, part 2, The Rise of Rome to 220 B.C., Cambridge University Press, 1989.

Political offices
Preceded by Marcus Valerius Corvus; Marcus Popillius Laenas	Roman consul 347 BC with Gaius Plautius Venox	Succeeded by Marcus Valerius Corvus; Gaius Poetelius Libo Visolus
Preceded by Marcus Fabius Dorsuo; Servius Sulpicius Camerinus Rufus	Roman consul II; 344 BC with Gaius Marcius Rutilus	Succeeded by Marcus Valerius Corvus; Aulus Cornelius Cossus Arvina
Preceded by Gaius Plautius Venox; Lucius Aemilius Mamercinus Privernas	Roman consul III; 340 BC with Publius Decius Mus	Succeeded by Tiberius Aemilius Mamercinus; Quintus Publilius Philo
