= Plautius Lateranus =

1st century AD Roman senator and politician

Plautius Lateranus (executed AD 65) was a Roman senator of the first century and a member of the influential Plautia gens.

Plautius was the son of Quintus Plautius, consul in AD 36. He was nephew to Aulus Plautius, the man who led the Invasion of Britain in AD 43, and it was through his good offices that Plautius Lateranus escaped the death penalty in AD 48, after his affair with the emperor Claudius' wife Messalina was discovered. Fortunately, Claudius held Aulus Plautius in high esteem. Though he escaped death, he was removed from his senatorial position, but was later granted readmittance under Nero.

In AD 65, Plautius Lateranus, who was then consul designatus, was accused of being a participant of the Pisonian conspiracy. Tacitus says that Lateranus joined from no personal grudge against Nero, but out of patriotism alone. His part in the plot was as follows: He was to prostrate himself before Nero, in a pretense of petitioning for financial assistance; then, being both 'resolute and muscular', he was to bring him down and hold him, allowing others of a military nature involved in the plot to kill him. When the plot was exposed, Nero had Plautius executed. Tacitus states that his 'removal' was so hasty that he was not permitted to say goodbye to his children, nor to choose the manner of his death. He was taken to a 'place reserved for slave executions', and died in resolute silence. The man who executed him, Statius Proxumus, was also involved in the plot, but Lateranus did not expose him.

Though Tacitus doesn't state the means of execution, Epictetus, in his Stoic Discourses, makes it clear that he was beheaded. Epictetus asks his students why they shouldn't accept death; why they should fear dying alone. Why don't they hold out their necks in "the way Lateranus did at Rome, when condemned by Nero to be beheaded? He held out his neck willingly to take the blow–but the blow was deficient, so he recoiled a bit, but then had enough self-command to offer his neck a second time."

His home was the Domus Laterana, later called the Lateran Palace, in Rome and now the site of the Archbasilica of Saint John Lateran.
