= Publius Decius Mus (consul 340 BC) =

Roman consul in 340 BC

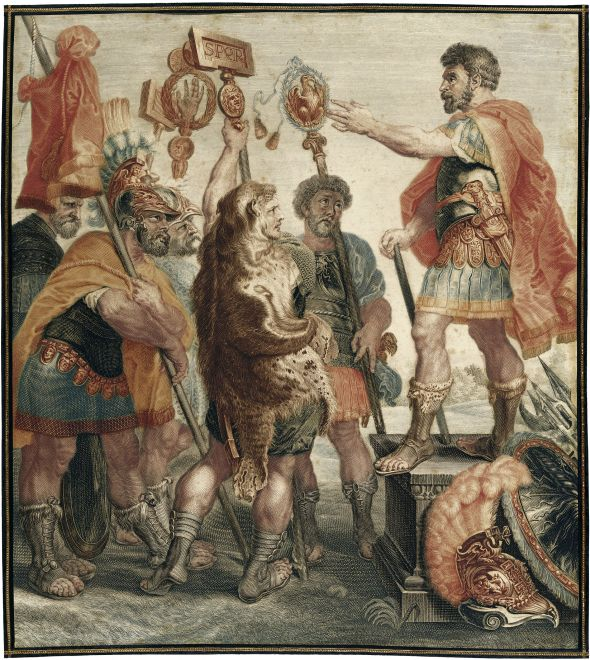
Decius Mus reporting his dream on the battlefield, in a painting by Jacob Matthias Schmutzer (1733–1811)

Publius Decius Mus, son of Quintus, of the plebeian gens Decia, was a Roman consul in 340 BC. He is noted particularly for sacrificing himself in battle through the ritual of devotio, as recorded by the Augustan historian Livy.

== Career ==
Decius Mus first enters history in 352 BC as an appointed official, one of the quinqueviri mensarii, public bankers charged with relieving citizen debts to some extent.

He served with distinction in the First Samnite War under Aulus Cornelius Cossus Arvina. In 343 BC, Cossus, leading his army through the mountain fastnesses of Samnium, became trapped in a valley by the Samnites. Decius, taking 1,600 men, seized a strong point through which the Samnites were obliged to pass, and held it against them until nightfall; breaking through their lines, he re-joined the main body of the army, which had gained the summit of the mountain and relative safety. The army then swept into the Samnites, gaining a complete victory and the spoils of the enemy camp. For the rescue of the trapped army he was awarded the Grass Crown by both his own army and by the army he relieved.

In 340 he was elected consul with Titus Manlius Torquatus, and the Romans allied themselves with their former enemies against the Latins in the Latin War. When during his consulate, an oracle announced that an army and the opposite army's general both would go to their deaths, Mus devoted himself and his foes to the Dii Manes and mother Earth to give his army the victory in the Battle of Vesuvius, in which he was slain and the enemy annihilated.

=== The devotio ===
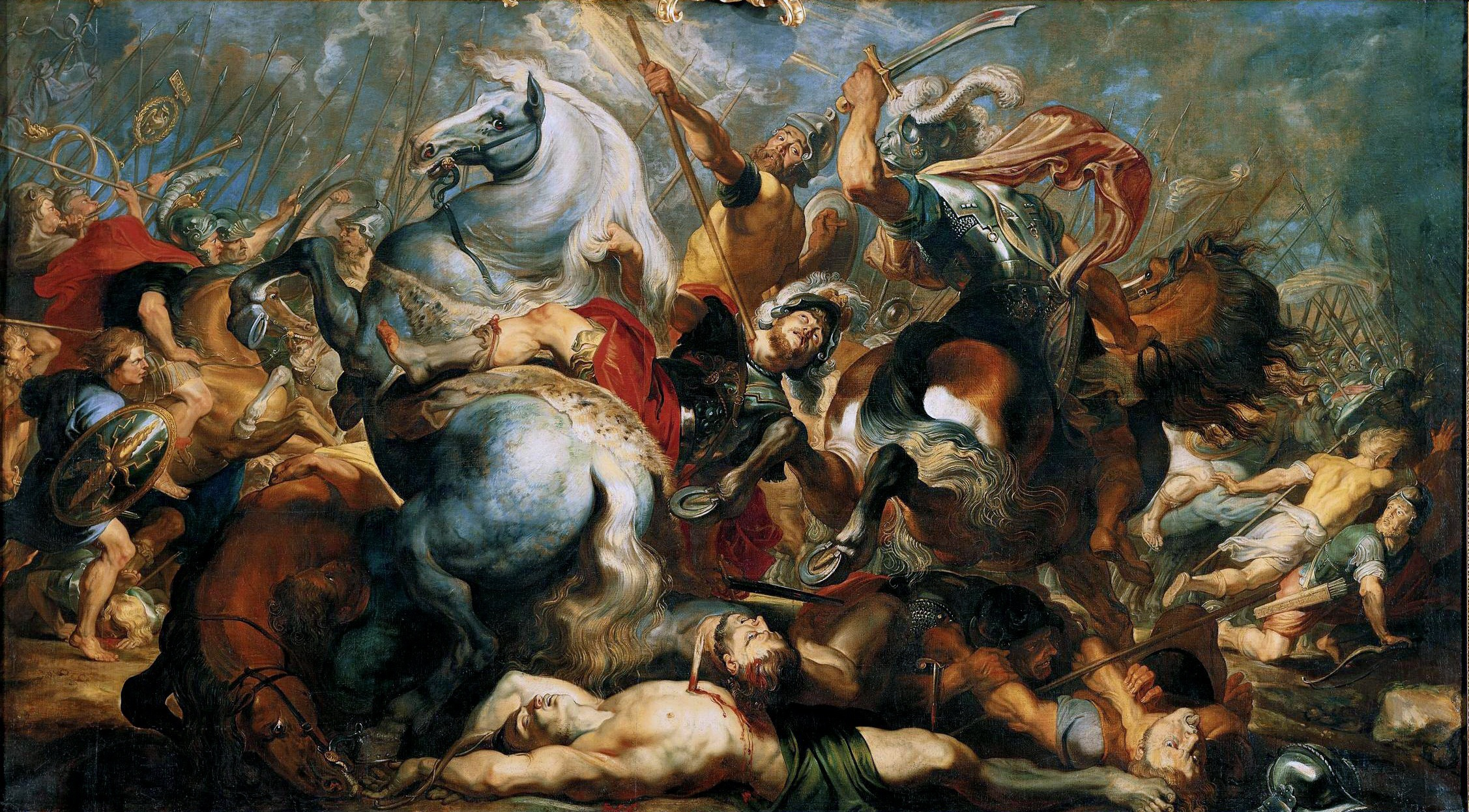
The Death of Decius Mus in Battle (1618) by Rubens

According to Livy, as the army marched near Capua, it was given to the two consuls in mutual dreams that the army whose general pledged himself and his foemen's host to the Dii Manes and Tellus Mater would be victorious. Upon confirmation from the haruspices, the two divulged a plan to their senior officers and their army that they would not lose heart, for they intended that whosoever's wing should falter first should so pledge his life to the gods of the underworld and the Earth.

Once the battle was engaged, the left wing began to falter and Decius Mus called upon the Pontifex Maximus, M. Valerius, to tell him the means by which to save the army. The pontifex prescribed the required ritual acts and a prayer (see devotio). After performing the ritual, the fully armored Decius Mus plunged his horse into the enemy with such supernatural vigor and violence that the awe-struck Latins soon refused to engage him, eventually bringing him down with darts. Even then, the Latins avoided his body, leaving a large space around it, and the left wing of the Romans, once faltering, now swept into this weakness in the enemy lines. Manlius, conducting the right wing, held fast, allowing the Latins to use up their reserves, before crushing the enemy host between the renewed left and Samnite foederati at their flank, leaving only a quarter of the enemy to flee.

He was the father of Publius Decius P.f. Mus, consul in 312 BC, 308 BC, 297 BC, and 295 BC and the grandfather of Publius Decius P.f. Mus, consul in 279 BC.

== In popular culture ==
At the behest of Franco Cattaneo, a Genoese businessman, Peter Paul Rubens created a series of eight paintings, modelli for tapestry weavers to recreate, commemorating Decius Mus.

In the 2016 United States presidential election, Michael Anton wrote under the pseudonym Publius Decius Mus to put forward a defence of the positions of then candidate Donald Trump. His writings were aimed at Republicans who held that Trump was not politically conservative enough to represent the party. He wrote that a risk of self-sacrifice was necessary to save the nation, maintaining that progressives had brought it to the brink of destruction. He used the actions of the passengers on United Airlines Flight 93 as an analogy.

== See also ==
- Horatii
- Cincinnatus
- Marcus Atilius Regulus
- Cato the Elder

Political offices
Preceded by Gaius Plautius Venox, and Lucius Aemilius Mamercinus Privernas	Consul of the Roman Republic; 340 BC with Titus Manlius Imperiosus Torquatus	Succeeded by Tiberius Aemilius Mamercinus, and Quintus Publilius Philo
