= Publius Plautius Rufus =

Early 1st century AD Roman aristocrat

Publius Plautius Rufus flourished during the first century, during the Principate of Augustus.

== Biography ==
Possibly the son of twice-praetor Gaius Plautius Rufus, Publius Plautius Rufus is mentioned in connection with two conspiracies in the ancient histories.

In the year AD 6, Cassius Dio writes that, due to the discontent of the people due to fire, famine and the new military tax, a pamphletting campaign was launched in the city. This was traceable to 'Publius Rufus,' though it was soon found that others were using his name falsely and seditiously, and Plautius was found to be not guilty of the crime. Then, in the year AD 8, Suetonius writes of a further, non-specific conspiracy which was said to involve 'Plautius Rufus' and Lucius Aemilius Paullus (consul 1), husband of Augustus' granddaughter, Julia the Younger. Plautius Rufus' name is thus restored by combining these two mentions.

However, there is no scholarly agreement that these two incidents, nor these two names, are related. Alternative theories have been posited: it is possible that his name should be rendered Plotius Rufus, the triumvir monetalis in BC 16-15 or that these two incidents may refer to two different men. The modern historian Birch speculates that Plautius Rufus may have been closely linked with Agrippa Postumus and may have been the man who was deprived of a consulship in AD 5 due to his links with Julia the Younger.

== Sources ==
- Suetonius, Life of Divus Augustus.
- Cassius Dio, Roman History, Book 55.
- Prosopographia Imperii Romani, p. 516.
- The Augustan Succession: An Historical Commentary on Cassius Dio's Roman History, Peter Michael Swan, 2004.
- Oxford commentary to Suetonius' Life of the Divus Augustus, 2014.
- Birch,The Settlement of 26 June a.d. 4 and Its Aftermath. Classical Quarterly, 1981, Vol 2.
