= Battle of Vesuvius =

First battle of the Latin War, 340 BC

Coordinates: 40.8211°N 14.4261°E

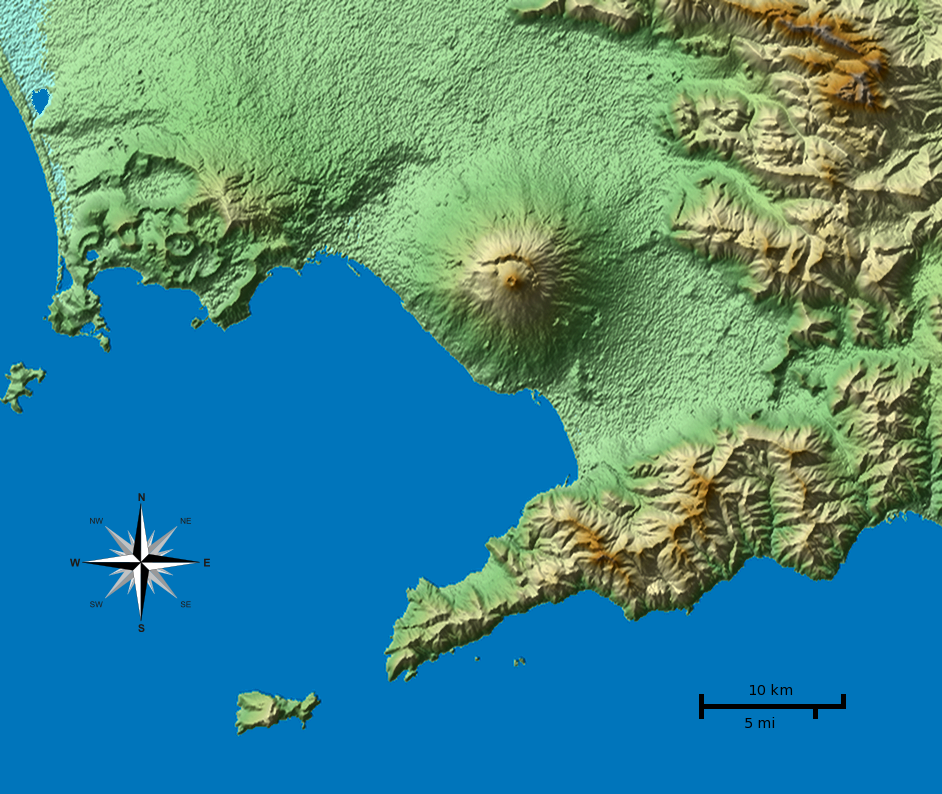
The territory around Vesuvius, where the battle took place

The Battle of Vesuvius (also known as the Battle of the Veseris) was the first recorded battle of the Latin War. The battle was fought near Mount Vesuvius in 340 BC between the Romans, with their allies the Samnites, against a coalition of several peoples: Latins, Campanians, Volsci, Sidicini, and Aurunci. The surviving sources on the battle, however, focus almost solely on the Romans (led by Titus Manlius Torquatus and Publius Decius Mus) and the Latins.

The battle became famous for two episodes said to have taken place: Manlius Torquatus' execution of his own son after he disobeyed orders and fought an enemy champion in single combat, and the self-sacrifice of Decius Mus, who devoted himself and the enemy army to the gods of the underworld, and then charged into the enemy lines and was slain.

After Decius Mus had fallen, consul Manlius Torquatus led his veteran reserve against Latin lines and killed or captured nearly three fourths of the Latin army. The remaining soldiers of the Latin army fled, but because the Roman loss was so great, they could not pursue their enemies.

== Background ==
The Latin and Campanian armies were stationed in Capua. Since the Romans saw this as a legitimate threat, they sent both consuls to Campania to work together.

== Duel of Titus Manlius ==
According to Livy, both armies arrived in the vicinity of Mount Vesuvius near the Veseris river. The consuls had ordered that no man was to leave his post to fight the enemy unless ordered to do so. However, after this order was put into motion Titus Manlius Torquatus, consul Manlius Torquatus' son, led a patrol into Latin territory and was challenged to a single combat against Geminus Maecius (a well known Tusculan warrior). T. Manlius accepted the challenge against his father's wishes and won the battle. On T. Manlius' return to camp he was arrested and then beheaded as an example of maintaining discipline.

== Consuls' dream ==
Decius Mus and Manlius Torquatus both had a dream before the final battle that the Romans would only be victorious if one of the consuls died. Decius and Manlius made a pact that whichever side of the battle opened up, then that leader would sacrifice himself in the battle.

== Battle ==
Manlius commanded that his soldiers be stationed on the right and Decius' forces on the left. Decius' wing opened and he charged into battle, immediately being killed on the front lines of the Latin army. Manlius then led his forces into battle to victory against the Latin army.

== Bibliography ==
- Cornell, TJ (1995), The Beginnings of Rome — Italy and Rome from the Bronze Age to the Punic Wars (c. 1000–264 BC), New York: Routledge, ISBN 978-0-415-01596-7
- Forsythe, Gary (2005), A Critical History of Early Rome, Berkeley: University of California Press, ISBN 0-520-24991-7
- Oakley, SP (1998), A Commentary on Livy Books VI–X, vol. II: Books VII–VIII, Oxford: Oxford University Press, ISBN 978-0-19-815226-2
- Salmon, ET (1967), Samnium and the Samnites, Cambridge University Press, ISBN 978-0-521-13572-6
