= Publius Plautius Hypsaeus =

1st century BCE Roman politician

Publius Plautius Hypsaeus was a politician of the Roman Republic during the first century BCE.

He was probably the grandson of Marcus Plautius Hypsaeus, consul in 125 BCE who, in 73 BCE, prosecuted Marcus Crassus for incestum with a Vestal Virgin.

Hypsaeus was Quaestor in around 60 BCE under Gnaeus Pompeius Magnus, and he was said to have had his amicitia (friendship/political backing). He was Aedile Curulus in 58 BCE and Praetor in 55 BCE.

In 52 BCE, Hypsaeus was one of three men – along with Titus Annius Milo and Quintus Metellus Scipio – who campaigned for the consulship. Their campaign was divisive, involving extensive bribery of the people and the formation of armed gangs loyal to each candidate. The open hostility was particularly marked between Publius Clodius Pulcher and Titus Annius Milo. Milo, backed by Cicero, was on one side, while Clodius and both Hypsaeus and Scipio were on the other. Their open violence culminated in the murder of Clodius and the burning down of both the Curia Julia and the Basilica Porcia in the Forum Romanum.

In consequence, the elections for the consulship and praetorship could not be completed, and Gnaeus Pompeius Magnus was made sole Consul for the year. One of his acts in this position was to propose trials for several offences, in particular the giving and receiving of bribes. He allowed that anyone who wished to could call anyone to account for a period of almost twenty years, specifically since his first consulship.

Hypsaeus was one of a number of prominent citizens to be prosecuted under these new laws. Pompey, despite their amicitia, was quick to abandon Hypsaeus during the prosecution for electoral malpractice in the following way: While he was coming from his bath, Hypsaeus threw himself at his feet, begging for help as a nobleman and a friend. Pompey insulted him, and walked away, saying that he was keeping him from his dinner. He was found guilty and exiled, but he retained his wealth, unlike Milo, exiled under the same law.
