= Gaius Plautius Decianus =

Roman consul in 329 BC

Gaius Plautius Decianus was a Roman general and politician who served as consul once in 329 BC. Plautius was from a plebeian family whose first consul, Gaius Plautius Proculus, had only attained the position in 358 BC, meaning that Plautius, and his family as of large, lacked the same kind of political clout which was held by more prominent patrician families. As for his exact lineage, nothing is known other than that both his father and grandfather were named Publius. During his consulship, he and his colleague Lucius Aemilius Mamercinus defeated a revolt by the cities of Privernum and Fundi, for which they celebrated a triumph.

== Consulship ==
In 329 BC, Plautius was elected to his first and only consulship, serving alongside Lucius Aemilius Mamercinus, his patrician colleague. The previous year, in 330 BC, the two cities of Privernum and Fundi revolted against Rome, with their cause being led by Vitruvius Vaccus, a general of Fundi who also owned properties in Rome. In response, the senate sent two armies led by the consuls to deal with the rebellion, with one, led by the consul Lucius Papirius Crassus defeating the army of Vaccus in pitched battle, and the second one under the command of Lucius Plautius Venox marching to Fundi and accepting the surrender of the city. The consuls then advanced to Privernum itself and laid siege to it before their consular year came to a close, prompting one of the consuls to return to Rome in order to conduct the elections in which Plautius and Aemilius would be chosen. Around this time, word reached the senate of a potential attack by the Gauls so the command was split, with Aemilius being chosen to take on the Gauls and Plautius being assigned with continuing the war on Privernum. Aemilius raised a massive army, levying all available men without exception, but within a few days it became clear that the news of the Gallic invasion was a false alarm, so instead both Plautius and Aemilius marched to take on Vaccus and Privernum. What happened next is a bit murky, either the city was taken by storm, or the city and Vaccus himself were surrendered by the Privenates. Either way however the result remained the same; Privernum was taken, the rebellion was quashed, and Vitruvius Vaccus was taken prisoner. When the senate heard word of this capture, they ordered Plautius to tear down the fortifications of Privernum and place a sizable Roman garrison in the city, and also gave permission for the consuls to celebrate a triumph for their victory. After Plautius and Aemilius, now known as "Privernas" because of the victory, had triumphed, Vitruvius Vaccus and his associates were executed and his lands in Rome were seized.

Political offices
Preceded by Lucius Papirius Crassus II and Lucius Plautius Venox	Consul of the Roman Republic; 329 BC with Lucius Aemilius Mamercinus Privernas	Succeeded by Publius Plautius Proculus and Publius Cornelius Scapula
