= Marcus Atilius Regulus Calenus =

Roman consul 335 BC

- Occupation: Politician
- Known for: Consul in 335 BC

Marcus Atilius Regulus Calenus was a fourth-century BC Roman politician.

== Biography ==
He was elected consul in 335 BC with Marcus Valerius Corvus as colleague, Corvus serving as consul for the fourth time.

During the consulate, the war against the Ausoni and Sidicini ended, and the Senate asked to be entrusted to Valerius Corvus alone.

After the victory of Corvus at Cales, he requested and obtained that the command of the army be entrusted to both consuls.
