= Gaius Plautius Venox =

Roman consul in 347 BC and 341 BC

Gaius Plautius Venox was a Roman statesman and general who served as consul in 347 and 341 BC. Plautius was a member of the family of the Plautii, a relatively undistinguished plebeian gens who had only achieved their first consulship in 358 BC. Plautius' father and grandfather were both named Lucius and may have had a son named Gaius, who was the father of Gaius Plautius Venox, Censor in 312 BC.

== Career ==
In 347 BC, Plautius served in his first consulship alongside Titus Manlius Imperiosus Torquatus, an illustrious Roman general of the era. In his year in office there was tranquility both at home and abroad, a condition which was only increased by the consuls reducing the interest rates on debts from one percent to half a percent, which made debts far more payable to those who held them.

In 341 BC, Plautius was elected consul for a second time, with Lucius Aemilius Mamercinus as his colleague. Unlike his previous consular year, this year was one marred by war, of which there were three. Firstly, there was a war with the city of Privernum, who had just revolted against Rome, secondly there was a conflict with the Volscians of Antium, who had just raided Roman territory, and thirdly the First Samnite War, which had begun two years prior, was still raging. In reaction to these conflicts, the senate assigned Plautius with the responsibility of combating the Volscians and Privernates, and gave the task of defeating the Samnites to Aemilius. Plautius firstly marched to Privernum, where he defeated the rebelling forces, took their city, and seized a significant portion of their territory in short order. Plautius then marched to Satricum where the Volscian force was encamped, and engaged the Volscians in pitched battle. The Volscians were far more difficult to repel than the Privernates, and due to their dogged efforts, the initial battle ended in a stalemate upon nightfall, with scores of both Volscians and Romans being slain. Despite their losses, the Romans under Plautius still formed to fight the Volscians the next morning, after which the Volscians, unwilling to face the Romans again after the previous day's losses, fled from the field. After achieving this victory, Plautius then plundered the Volscian territory with great vigor, even reaching the coast.

Political offices
Preceded by Marcus Valerius Corvus, and Marcus Popillius Laenas	Consul of the Roman Republic; 347 BC with Titus Manlius Torquatus	Succeeded by Marcus Valerius Corvus II, and Gaius Poetelius Libo Visolus II
Preceded by Quintus Servilius Ahala III, and Gaius Marcius Rutilus IV	Consul of the Roman Republic; 341 BC with Lucius Aemilius Mamercinus Privernas	Succeeded by Titus Manlius Torquatus III, and Publius Decius Mus
