= Volscian language =

Ancient Italic language

Volscian
- Native to: Latium
- Region: Italy
- Ethnicity: Volsci
- Era: 3rd century BCE
- Language family: Indo-European: Italic; Osco-Umbrian; Umbrian; Volscian
- Writing system: Old Italic alphabet

Language codes
- ISO 639-3: xvo
- Glottolog: vols1237
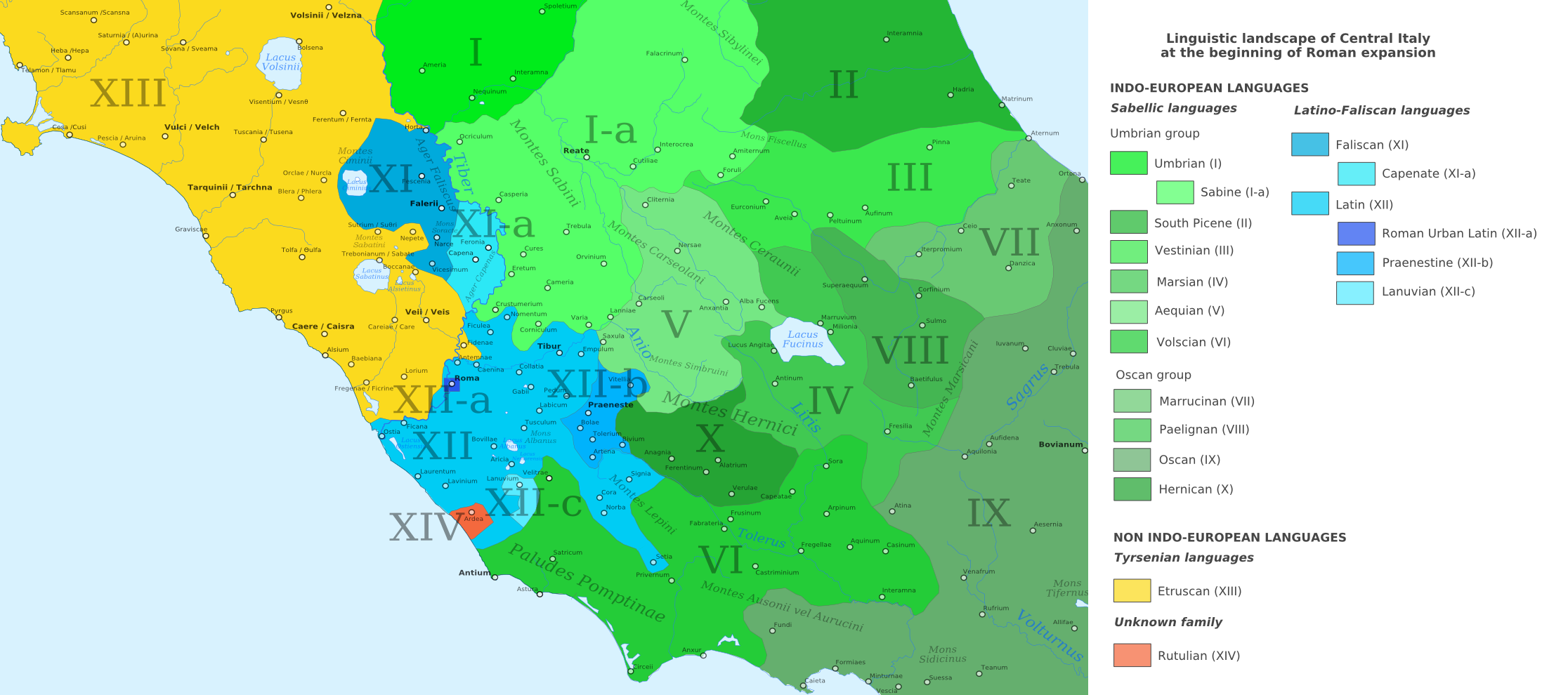
- Location of the Volsci.

Volscian was a Sabellic Italic language, which was spoken by the Volsci and closely related to Oscan and Umbrian.

== Overview ==
Volscian is attested in an inscription found in Velitrae (Velletri), dating probably from early in the 3rd century BC; it is cut upon a small bronze plate (now in the Naples Museum), which must have once been fixed to some votive object, dedicated to the god Declunus (or the goddess Decluna). The language of this inscription is clear enough to show the very marked peculiarities that rank it close to the language of the Iguvine Tables. It shows on the one hand the labialization of the original velar q (Volscian pis = Latin quis), and on the other hand it palatalizes the guttural c before a following i (Volscian façia Latin faciat). Like Umbrian also, but unlike Latin and Oscan, it has changed all the diphthongs into simple vowels (Volscian se parallel to Oscan svai; Volscian deue, Old Latin and Oscan deiuai or deiuoi). This phenomenon of what might have been taken for a piece of Umbrian text appearing in a district remote from Umbria and hemmed in by Latins on the north and Oscan-speaking Samnites on the south is a most curious feature in the geographical distribution of the Italic dialects, and is clearly the result of some complex historical movements.

In seeking for an explanation, academics have suggested that there is some evidence in the ethnicon itself: the name Volsci belongs to what may be called the -co- group of tribal names in the centre, and mainly on the west coast, of Italy, all of whom were subdued by the Romans before the end of the 4th century BC; and many of whom were conquered by the Samnites about a century or more earlier. They are, from south to north, Osci, Aurunci, Hernici, Marruci, Falisci; with these were no doubt associated the original inhabitants of Aricia and of Sidicinum, of Vescia among the Aurunci, and of Labici close to Hernican territory.

The same formative element appears in the adjective Mons Massicus, and the names Glanica and Marica belonging to the Auruncan district, with Graviscae in south Etruria, and a few other names in central Italy (see "I due strati nella popolazione Indo-Europea dell'Italia Antica," in the Atti del Congresso Internazionale di Scienze Storiche, Rome, 1903, p. 17). With these names must clearly be judged the forms Etrusci and Tusci, although these forms must not be regarded as anything but the names given to the Etruscans by the folk among whom they settled. Now the historical fortune of these tribes is reflected in several of their names (see Sabini). The Samnite and Roman conquerors tended to impose the form of their own ethnicon, namely the suffix -no-, upon the tribes they conquered; hence the Marruci became the Marrucini, the Sarici became Aricini, and it seems at least probable that the forms Sidicini, Carecini, and others of this shape are the results of this same process.

The conclusion suggested is that these -co- tribes occupied the centre and west coast of Italy at the time of the Etruscan invasion; whereas the -no- tribes only reached this part of Italy, or at least only became dominant there, long after the Etruscans had settled in the Peninsula.

It remains, therefore, to ask whether any information can be had about the language of this primitive -co- folk, and whether they can be identified as the authors of any of the various archaeological strata now recognized on Italian soil. If the conclusions suggested under Sabini may be accepted as sound we should expect to find the Volsci speaking a language similar to that of the Ligures, whose fondness for the suffix -sco- has been noticed, and identical with that spoken by the plebeians of Rome, and that this branch of Indo-European was among those that preserved the original Indo-European Velars from the labialization that befell them in the speech of the Samnites. The language of the inscription of Velitrae offers at first sight a difficulty from this point of view, in the conversion it shows of q to p, but the ethnicon of Velitrae is Veliternus, and the people are called on the inscription itself Velestrom (genitive plural); so nothing prevents assuming there was a settlement of Sabines among the Volscian hills, with their language, to some extent, (e.g., in the diphthongs and palatals) corrupted by the speech around them, just as was the case with the Sabine language of the Iguvini, whose very name became Iguvinates, the suffix -ti- being much more frequent among the -co- tribes than among the Sabines.

The name Volsci itself is significant not merely in its suffix; the older Volusci clearly contains the word meaning marsh identical with Gr. helos, since the change of *velos- to *volus- is phonetically regular in Latin. The name Marica ("goddess of the salt-marshes") among the Aurunci appears also both on the coast of Picenum and among the Ligurians; and Stephanus of Byzantium identified the Osci with the Siculi, who, there is reason to suspect, were kinsmen of the Ligures. It is remarkable in how many marshy places this -co- or -ca- suffix is used. Besides the Aurunci and the dea Marica and the intempestaeque Graviscae (Aeneis 10.184), we have the Ustica cubans of Horace (Odes 1.17.1), the Hernici in the Trerus Valley, Satricum and Glanica in the Pontine Marshes.

== Example Text ==
The following is the text of the Velitrae inscription:

deue : declune : statom : sepis : atahus : pis : uelestrom
façia : esaristrom : se : bim : asif : uesclis : uinu : arpatitu
sepis : toticu : couehriu : sepu : ferom : pihom : estu
ec : se : cosuties : ma : ca : tafanies : medix : sistiatiens

"To the goddess Declona this is decreed. If anyone will have snatched [some foliage or firewood] for himself, even if it were [for] a sacrifice, it will be a violation. Let [the guilty one] place in arrangement an ox and coins for the jars and for the wine. If anyone (will have taken the foliage or firewood) with the approval of the public assembly, the carrying away will be without violation. Egnatus Cossutius, son of Seppius and Marcus Tafanius, son of Gavius, magistrates, established [this]".

Translation by Blanca María Prósper:

"If someone has committed an act of destruction aﬀecting the sacred hoard of the goddess Declona, (then) whoever makes up for it, vindicating his superior right to do so, should besprinkle (it) (pour a libation) with vessels of food and with wine. If anyone (does this) with the consent of the public assembly (or: in public, with the knowledge of the curial priest), let the procedure be considered lawful".

== Sources ==
- For the text and fuller account of the Volscian inscription, and for other records of the dialect, see R. S. Conway, The Italic Dialects, pp. 267 sqq.
