= Ausonia, Lazio =

Ausonia
- Comune
- Comune di Ausonia
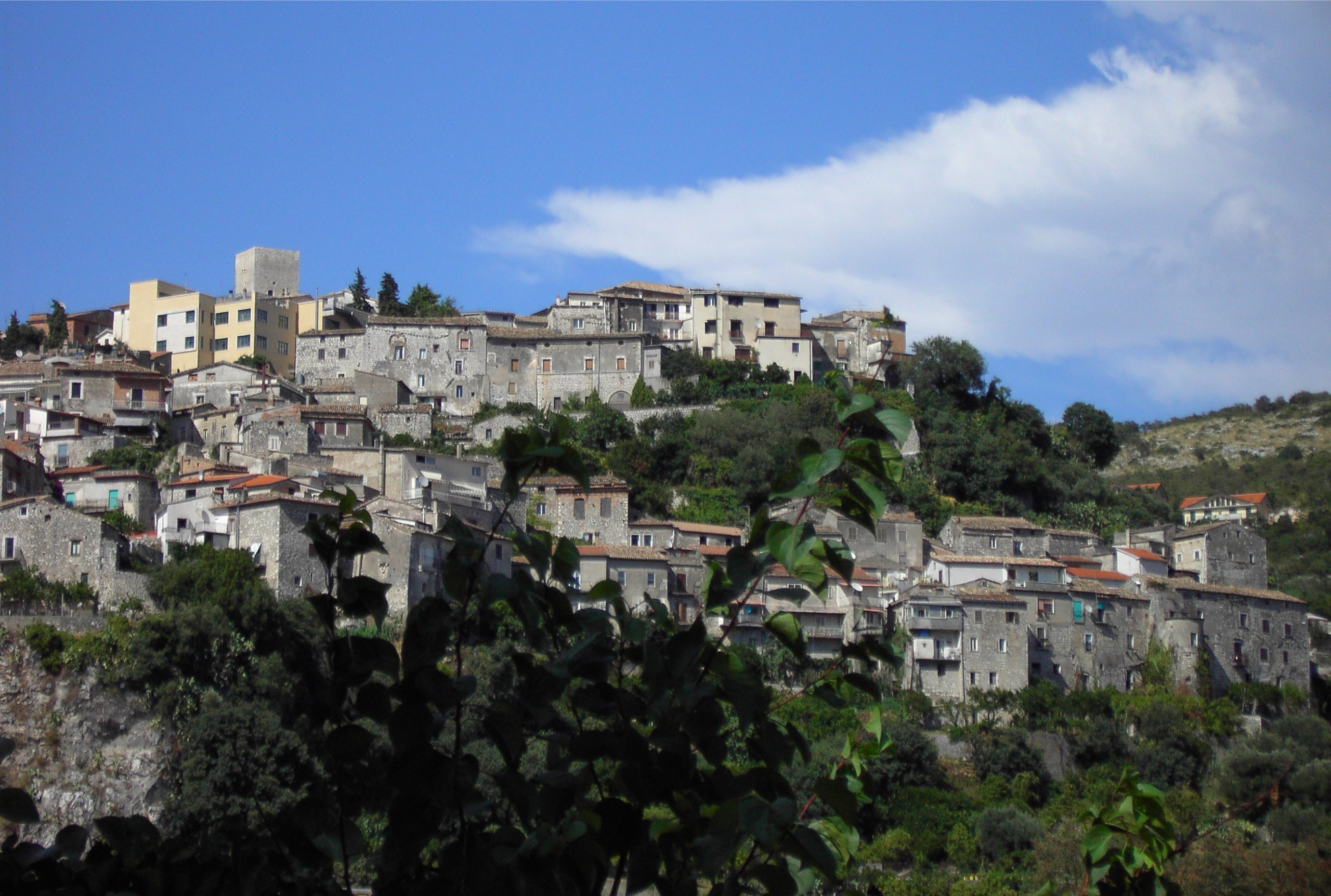
- View of Ausonia

- Coat of arms

- Location within Italy Location within Lazio
- Coordinates: 41°21′N 13°45′E
- Country: Italy
- Region: Lazio
- Province: Frosinone (FR)
- Frazioni: Madonna del Piano, Selvacava

Government
  - Mayor: Benedetto Cardillo

Area
  - Total: 20 km^{2} (7.7 sq mi)
- Elevation: 178 m (584 ft)

Population (28 February 2017)
  - Total: 2,593
  - Density: 130/km^{2} (340/sq mi)
- Demonym: Ausoniesi
- Time zone: UTC+1 (CET)
  - Summer (DST): UTC+2 (CEST)
- Postal code: 03040
- Dialing code: 0776
- Patron saint: St. Michael
- Saint day: September 29
- Website: Official website

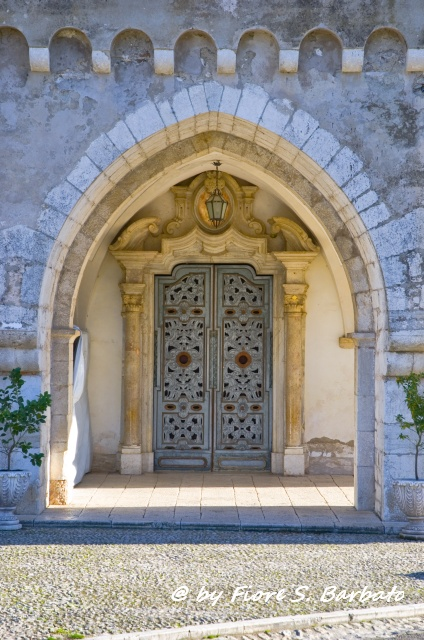
Portal of the Santuario di Santa Maria del Piano.

Ausonia is a town and comune in southern Lazio, central Italy. It takes its name from the Ausones/Aurunci, whose ancient town Ausona (member of the Auruncan Pentapolis), located nearby, was destroyed by the Romans in 314 BC. In the Middle Ages it was known as Fratte.

Ausonia is located near the border between Lazio and Campania, in a valley between the Monti Aurunci and the Mainarde. Its names stems from Ausona, an ancient city of the Osci, whose location, however, has not been identified after it was destroyed by the Romans in 314 BC. The finding of Latin inscriptions devoted to Hercules suggest that a pilgrimage road could pass from here in ancient times.

== Main sights ==
The main attraction is the sanctuary of Santa Maria del Piano (15th century, although founded in 1100). Its sacristy has a maiolica pavement from the 17th-century Neapolitan school, and a polyptych by Giovanni Filippo Criscuolo (1531). The crypt has medieval frescoes with stories of the life of St Remicarda.

Other churches include the 12th-century San Michele Arcangelo and the church of Santa Maria di Correano.

Ausonia is home to a medieval castle built by the Princes of Capua in the 11th century. Remains include two towers around the keep and the walls.

== Dialect ==
Southern Latian dialect is spoken in the city.
