= Aurunca =

Capital or metropolis of the little mountain tribe of the Aurunci

The ancient city of Aurunca was the capital or metropolis of the little mountain tribe of the Aurunci (in the more limited sense of that name (see Aurunci)), was situated on one of the summits of the volcanic group of mountains, which rise above the plains of Campania, near Suessa and Teanum.

The name Aurunca is found only in Festus, who wrote that it was founded by Auson, the son of Ulysses and Circe; but Livy clearly alludes to its existence, though without mentioning the name. He tells us, that in 337 BC, the Aurunci, being hard pressed by their neighbours the Sidicini, abandoned their city, and took refuge at Suessa, which they fortified; and that their ancient city was destroyed by the Sidicini.

Aurunca was never rebuilt, and hence no subsequent notice of it is found; but some vestiges of it have been discovered on the summit of a narrow mountain ridge, now called La Serra, or La Cortinella, about 5 miles (8.0 km) north of Suessa, where there are some fragments of the ancient walls, and massive substructions, probably those of a temple. The hill on which it stood forms part of the outer edge, or encircling ridge of an ancient volcanic crater, the highest point of which, called the Monte di Santa Croce, attains an elevation of 3,200 feet (980 m) above the sea; and the site of the ancient town must have been, like that of Alba Longa, a long and narrow plateau on the summit of this ridge. It is to this elevated position that Virgil alludes (De collibus altis Aurunci misere patres). For the description of the remains and site of the ancient city, see Abeken (1839) Suessa was frequently distinguished by the epithet Auranca, and hence Juvenal terms Gaius Lucilius, who was a native of that city, Auruncae alumnus.

== See also ==
- Ausona (ancient city), also only mentioned by Festus
