= Happisburgh footprints =

Fossilized hominid footprints in Norfolk, England

Coordinates: 52°49′31″N 01°32′06″E

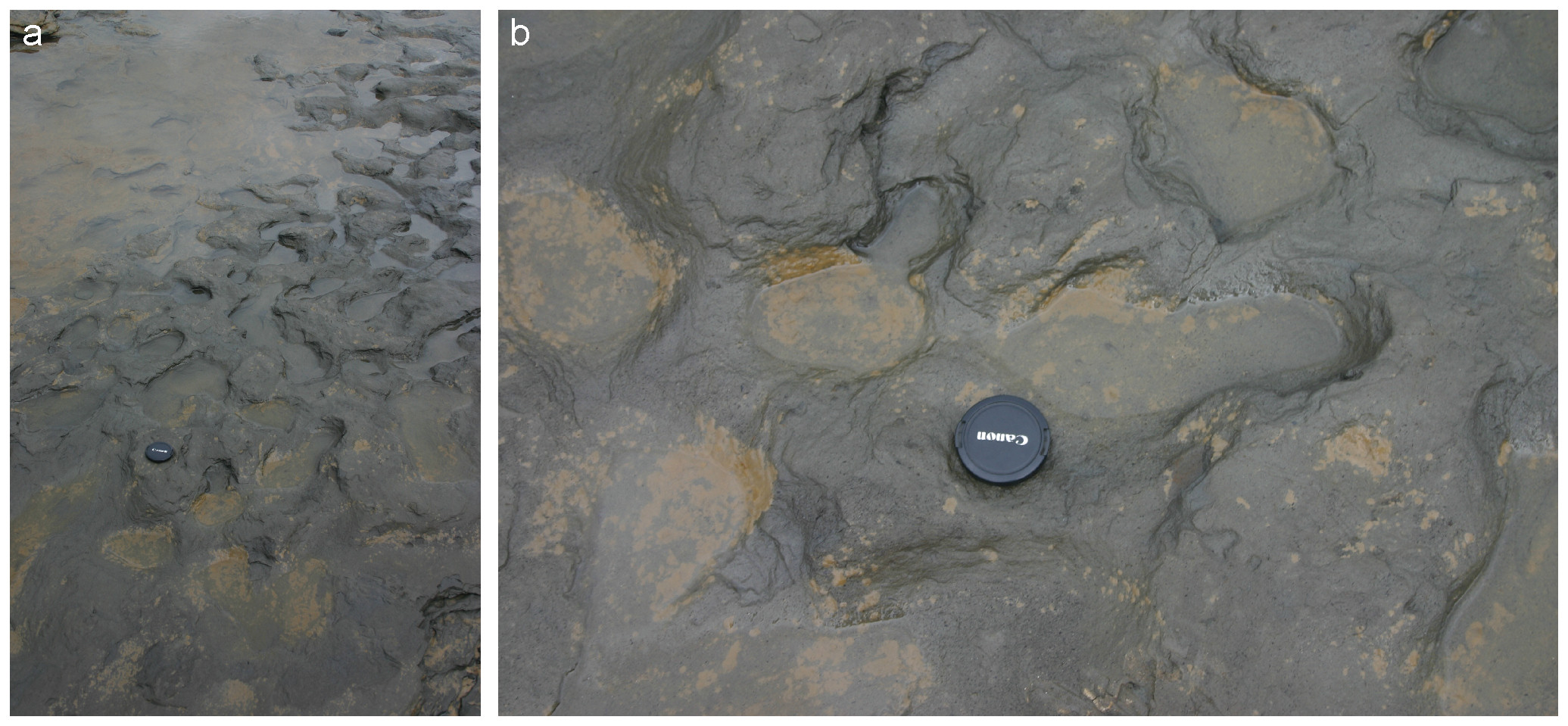
The Happisburgh footprints with a camera lens cap for scale

The Happisburgh footprints were a set of fossilized hominid footprints that date to the end of the Early Pleistocene, around 850–950,000 years ago. They were discovered in May 2013 in a newly uncovered sediment layer of the Cromer Forest Bed on a beach at Happisburgh in Norfolk, England, and carefully photographed in 3D before being destroyed by the tide shortly afterwards.

Research results on the footprints were announced on 7 February 2014, identifying them as the oldest known hominid footprints outside Africa.

Before the Happisburgh discovery, the oldest known footprints in Europe were the Ciampate del Diavolo tracks found at the Roccamonfina volcano in Italy, dated to around 350,000 years ago.

Winning the 2015 'Rescue Dig of the Year' award, the Happisburgh footprint discovery caught the public eye. It was featured in an exhibition in London's Natural History Museum.

== Discovery ==
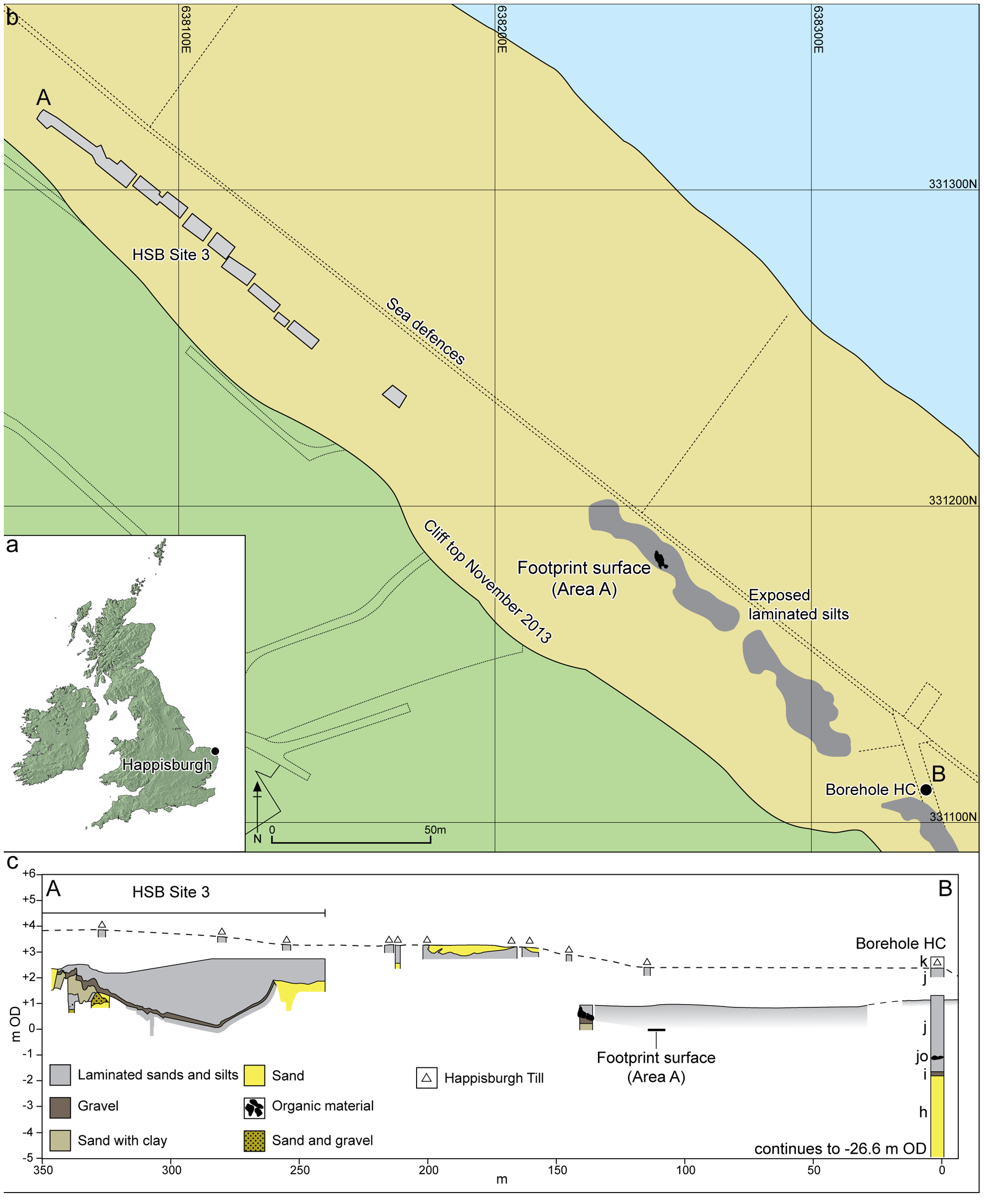
Plan of the Happisburgh site, showing exposed and recorded foreshore sediments and location of the footprint surface

The footprints were discovered in May 2013 by Nicholas Ashton, curator at the British Museum, and Martin Bates, from Trinity St David's University in Wales, who were carrying out research as part of the Pathways to Ancient Britain (PAB) project.

The footprints were found in the sediment, partially covered by beach sand, at low tide on the foreshore at Happisburgh. The sediment had been laid down in the estuary of a long-vanished river and subsequently been covered by sand, preserving its surface. The layer of sediment underlies a cliff on the beach, but after stormy weather, the protective layer of sand was washed away and the sediment exposed. The sediments are stratigraphically considered to belong to the Cromer Forest Bed unit.

Because of the softness of the sediment, which lay below the high tide mark, tidal action eroded it, and within two weeks, the footprints had been destroyed.

Although the researchers could not preserve the footprints, they worked during periods of low tide, often in pouring rain, to record 3D images of all the footprints by using photogrammetry. The images were analysed by Isabelle De Groote of Liverpool John Moores University, who was able to confirm that the hollows in the sediment were hominin footprints.

Facts concerning the discovery were published by Ashton and other members of the research team in February 2014 in the science journal PLOS ONE.

== Description ==
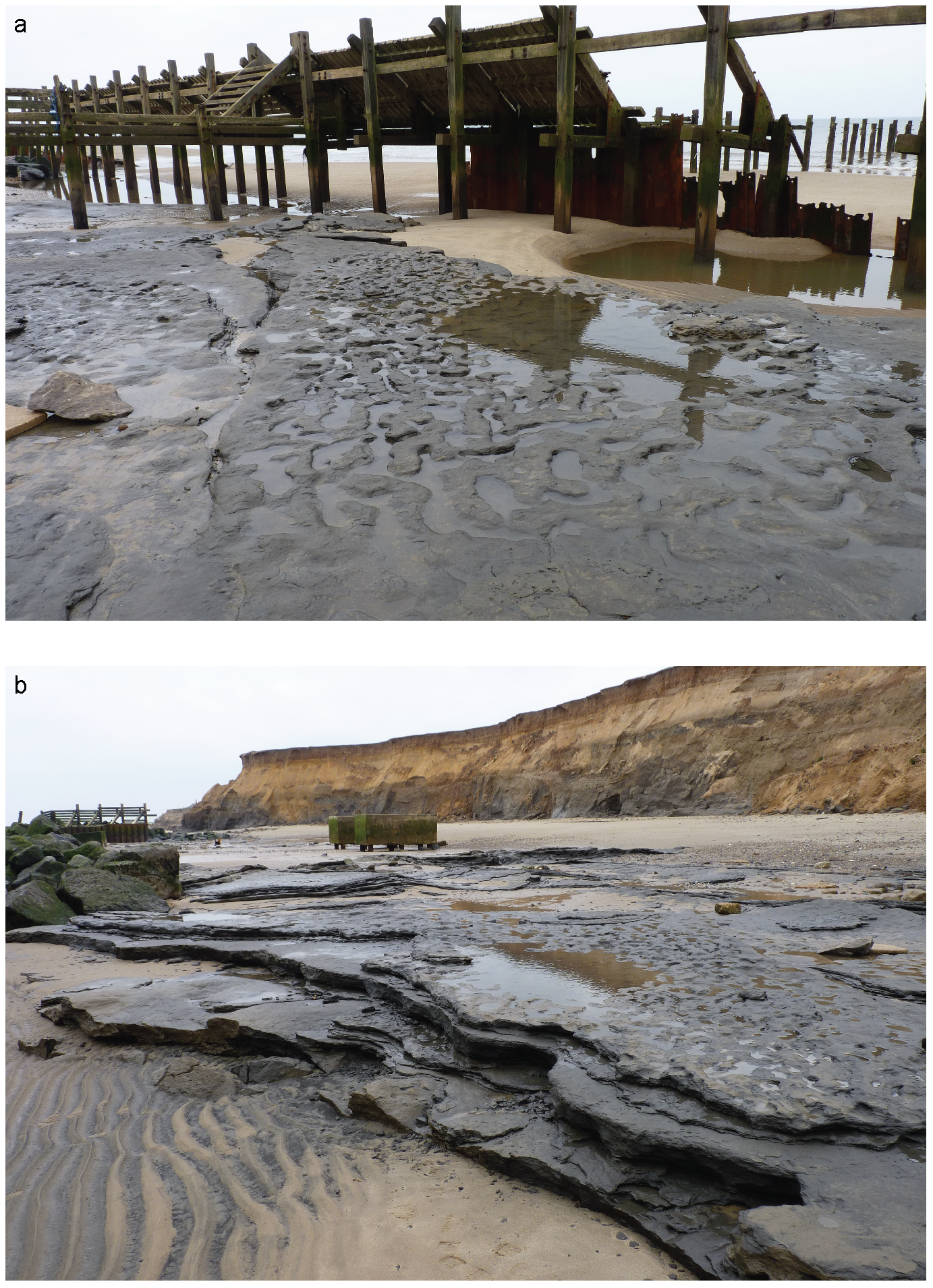
Photographs of Area A at Happisburgh, showing: (a) view of footprint surface looking north; and (b) view of footprint surface looking south, also showing underlying horizontally bedded laminated silts

Approximately fifty footprints were found in an area measuring nearly 40 m^{2} (430 sq ft). Twelve were largely complete, and two showed details of toes. The footprints of approximately five individuals have been identified, including adults and children. The footprints measured between 140 and 260 mm (5.5 and 10.2 in), thought to equate to heights between 0.9 and 1.7 m (2 ft 11 in and 5 ft 7 in). It has been tentatively proposed that the individuals who made them were from the species Homo antecessor, known to have lived in the Atapuerca Mountains of northern Spain around 800,000 years ago. No hominin fossils have been found at Happisburgh. A later 2020 study which analysed the footprints argued that they were similar to footprints attributed to Homo erectus from Ileret, Kenya.

Analysis shows that the group of perhaps five individuals was walking in a southerly direction (upstream) along mudflats in the estuary of an early path of the River Thames that flowed into the sea farther north than it did when south-east Britain was joined to the European continent. Archaeologists have speculated that the group was searching the mudflats for seafood such as lugworms, shellfish, crabs, and seaweed. It is possible that the group might have lived on an island in the estuary that provided safety from predators and were travelling from their island base to the shore at low tide.

== Dating ==
The Happisburgh site is too old to date using radiocarbon dating, which is unsuitable for sites older than approximately 50,000 years. Dating the site has instead been based upon stratigraphy, palaeomagnetism, and the evidence of fossil flora and fauna in the sediments.

Magnetic signatures within the sedimentary deposits indicate they were laid down between the two most recent geomagnetic reversals – the Brunhes–Matuyama reversal around 780,000 years ago and the Jaramillo reversal around 950,000 to 1 million years ago.

The evidence of fossil flora and fauna using indicators such as the fossilized teeth of voles, which provide very accurate dating evidence, pushes the lower limit back to at least 840,000 years ago.

On this basis, the range of possible dates for the deposition of the sediments that the footprints were found in stretches from 850,000 to 950,000 years ago, but further research is necessary to narrow the window.

A dissenting view has been presented by the geophysicist Rob Westaway, who proposed a younger date of towards the end of Marine Isotope Stage 15c, around 600,000 years ago. In the view of paleontologist Paul Pettitt and Mark White, Westaway's views deserve to be taken seriously.

== Pleistocene geography ==
Map showing the location of Happisburgh during the Early Pleistocene, approximately 800,000 years ago

At the time the Happisburgh hominins lived, a land bridge existed between Britain and France before the formation of the English Channel about 450,000 years ago. The ancestral River Thames flowed further north than it does today before converging with the ancient Bytham River, while the landscape of a large part of modern-day East Anglia consisted of a series of clay ridges and troughs known as the East Anglian Crag Basin. Happisburgh lay about 15 mi (24 km) further inland than it does today and was the site of an ancient estuary where the Bytham and Thames rivers converged to flow into what would then have been a maritime bay.

When the footprints were made, the estuary occupied a grassy, open valley surrounded by pine forests, with a climate similar to that of modern southern Scandinavia. It would have been inhabited by mammoths, woolly rhinoceros, Hippopotamus antiquus, giant deer, and bison, which were preyed upon by sabre-toothed cats, lions, wolves, and striped hyena. As well as an abundant supply of game and edible plants, the river gravels were rich in flint deposits, which early humans would have found an invaluable resource.

The Happisburgh finds mark the first time evidence of early humans from about 900,000 years ago has been found so far north. Palaeontologists had believed that hominins of the period required a much warmer climate, but the inhabitants of prehistoric Happisburgh had adapted to the cold, suggesting that they had developed advanced methods of hunting, clothing, sheltering, and warming much earlier than previously thought.

== Archaeological context ==
Happisburgh has produced several significant archaeological finds over many years. As the shoreline is subject to severe coastal erosion, new material is constantly being exposed along the cliffs and on the beach. Prehistoric discoveries have been noted since 1820 when fishermen trawling oyster beds offshore found their nets had brought up teeth, bones, horns, and antlers from elephants, rhinos, giant deer, and other extinct species. An exceptionally high tide in February 1825 exposed more prehistoric remains when it swept away sediment that had buried an ancient landscape of fossilized tree stumps, animal bones, and fir cones. In January 1877, a great storm swept huge ironstone slabs from the sea bed onto Happisburgh beach. The slabs preserved the impressions of leaves from oaks, elms, beeches, birches, and willows that had lived thousands of years ago. Pleistocene bison bones, found in the 1870s, provided the first evidence of early human activity; a re-examination of the bones in 1999 found that they were scored with tell-tale cut marks, indicating that humans had butchered the animals with stone tools.

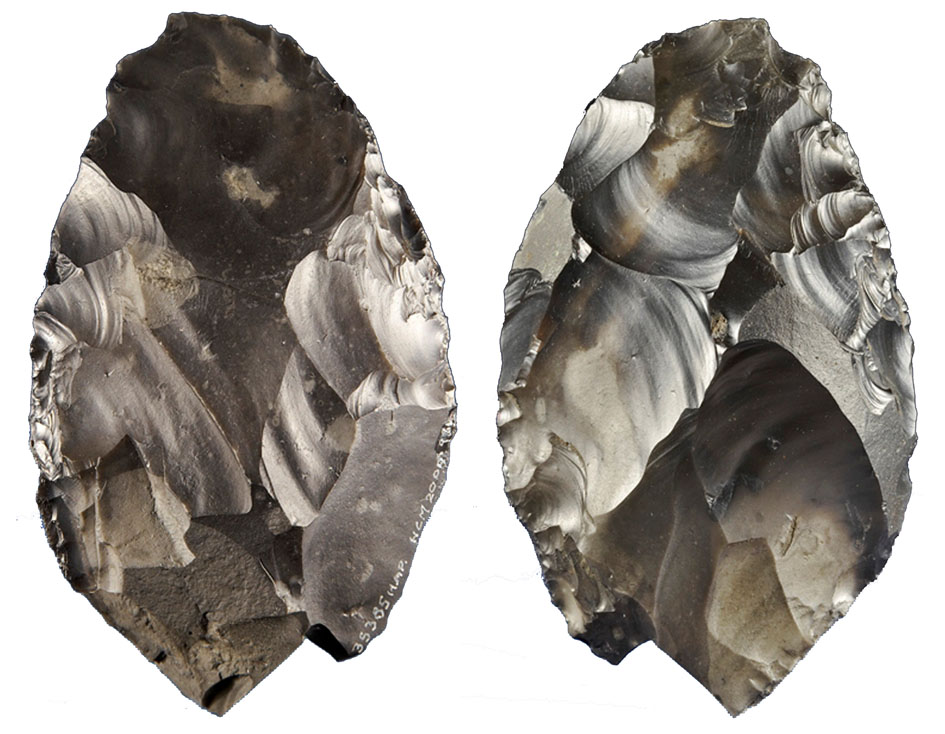
Paleolithic handaxe, from Happisburgh, found on the beach by a man walking his dog in 2000

In 2000, a black flint handaxe, dating to between 600,000 and 800,000 years ago, was found by a man walking on the beach. In 2012, for the television documentary Britain's Secret Treasures, the handaxe was selected by a panel of experts from the British Museum and the Council for British Archaeology as the most important item on a list of fifty archaeological discoveries made by members of the public.

Since the axe's discovery, the palaeolithic history of Happisburgh has been the subject of the Ancient Human Occupation of Britain (AHOB) and Pathways to Ancient Britain (PAB) projects, directed by Nick Ashton and Chris Stringer, funded by grants from the Leverhulme Trust and Calleva Foundation. Between 2005 and 2010, eighty palaeolithic flint tools, mostly cores, flakes, and flake tools, were excavated from the foreshore in sediment dating back to up to 950,000 years ago. The tools are believed to have been made by Homo antecessor, the same species thought to have made the footprints, and are the earliest artefacts found in northern Europe.

Archaeologists hope to reconstruct the environment in which the footprints were made by analysing remains of flora and fauna from the sediments. The remains of 15 species of mammals, 160 species of insects, and more than 100 species of plants have been recovered so far.

== Exhibition ==
2014 VOA report about the footprints

The Happisburgh footprints featured in an exhibition, "Britain: One Million Years of the Human Story", at the Natural History Museum in London from 13 February 2014. They were also included in an exhibition entitled "Moving stories three journeys" at the British Museum between 30 March – 30 April 2017.

== Awards ==
The Happisburgh footprints won the 'Rescue Dig of the Year' title, voted for by the general public, in the 2015 Current Archaeology Awards.

== See also ==
- Boxgrove Palaeolithic site, 480,000 year old site containing the oldest human remains in Britain
- Ancient footprints of Acahualinca – late Holocene human footprints found near the shore of Lake Managua in Nicaragua, dating to approximately 2,120 years ago.
- Eve's footprint – footprints of a single female found at Langebaan, South Africa in 1995, dating to approximately 117,000 years ago.
- Ileret – footprints of Homo erectus found at Ileret, Northern Kenya, dating to approximately 1.5 million years ago.
- Laetoli footprints – a line of hominid footprints, discovered at Laetoli, Tanzania by Mary Leakey in 1976, dating to approximately 3.6 million years ago.
- List of fossil sites (with link directory)
- List of hominina (hominid) fossils (with images)
