= Ausona (ancient city) =

Coordinates: 41.355425°N 13.748744°E

Ausona (today Ausonia) was a 4th-century BC city in the central Italian region of Latium. It was one of the three cities possessed by the tribe of the Ausones and its name seems to imply that it was their chief city or metropolis (the others were Cales and Aurunca). It is only once mentioned in history: during the Second Samnite War (326–304 BC), when—the Ausones having revolted against the Romans—all three of their cities were betrayed into the hands of the Roman consuls, and their inhabitants put to the sword without mercy. No subsequent notice is found of Ausona; but it is supposed to have been situated on the banks of the little river still called Ausente, which flows into the Liris near its mouth. The plain below the modern village of Le Fratte, near the sources of this little stream, is still known as the Piano dell'Ausente; and some remains of a Roman town have been discovered there.
