= San Michele Arcangelo, Ausonia =

Church in Ausonia, Lazio, Italy

Coordinates: 41°21′20″N 13°44′56″E

San Michele Arcangelo is a romanesque style, Roman Catholic church in the town of Ausonia, province of Frosinone, region of Lazio, Italy.

== History ==
San Michele is the main church of the town, and as its name would suggest, it is sited at the summit of a hill, the highest point in town. St Michael Archangel is the patron saint of high places. Made of white stone, the church was built during the end of the 12th to the early 13th century at the site of a former Roman temple dedicated to the cult of Hercules. A number of pillars with pagan themes, including the myth of Leda and the Swan were used as spolia in construction. At the entrance are two Roman urns used as holy water receptacles.
