= Osci =

Italic people of Campania and Latium adiectum during Roman times

Ethnolinguistic map of Italy in the Iron Age, before the Roman expansion and conquest of Italy

The Osci (also called Oscans, Opici, Opsci, Obsci, Opicans) were an Italic people of Campania and Latium adiectum before and during Roman times.

Traditions of the Opici fall into the legendary period of Italian history, roughly from the beginning of the first millennium BC until the foundation of the Roman Republic. No consensus can be reached concerning their location and language. By the end of this period, the Oscan language had evolved and was spoken by a number of sovereign tribal states. By far the most important of these in terms of military prowess and wealth was the Samnites, who rivalled Rome for about 50 years in the second half of the 4th century BC, sometimes being allies, and sometimes at war with the city, until they were finally subdued with considerable difficulty and were incorporated into the Roman state.

The Osci kept their independence by playing one state against another, especially the Romans and Samnites. Their sovereignty was finally lost during the Second Samnite War when, prior to invading Samnium, the Romans found it necessary to secure the border tribes. After the war, the Oscans assimilated quickly to Roman culture. Their cultural legacy survived only in place names and literary references.

== Classical sources ==
According to Aristotle, the Opici lived in "the part of Italy towards Tyrrhenia" and were also called Ausones. Antiochus of Syracuse agreed that the Opici were Ausones and placed them in Campania. Strabo, however, the chief source for the fragments of Antiochus, himself distinguished between the Osci and the Ausones, remarking that the Osci had disappeared, but the Romans still used their dialect as a literary language, and that the "high sea" near Sicily was still named Ausonian even though the Ausonians never lived near it. Aurunci is the Roman name for Ausones by a commonplace change of an s to an r in Latin: *Ausuni> *Auruni> *Aurunici> Aurunci. They were perhaps the same people in the early Roman Republic. In the 4th century BC, the names came to be applied to distinct tribes.

== History ==
=== Oscans of the early republic ===
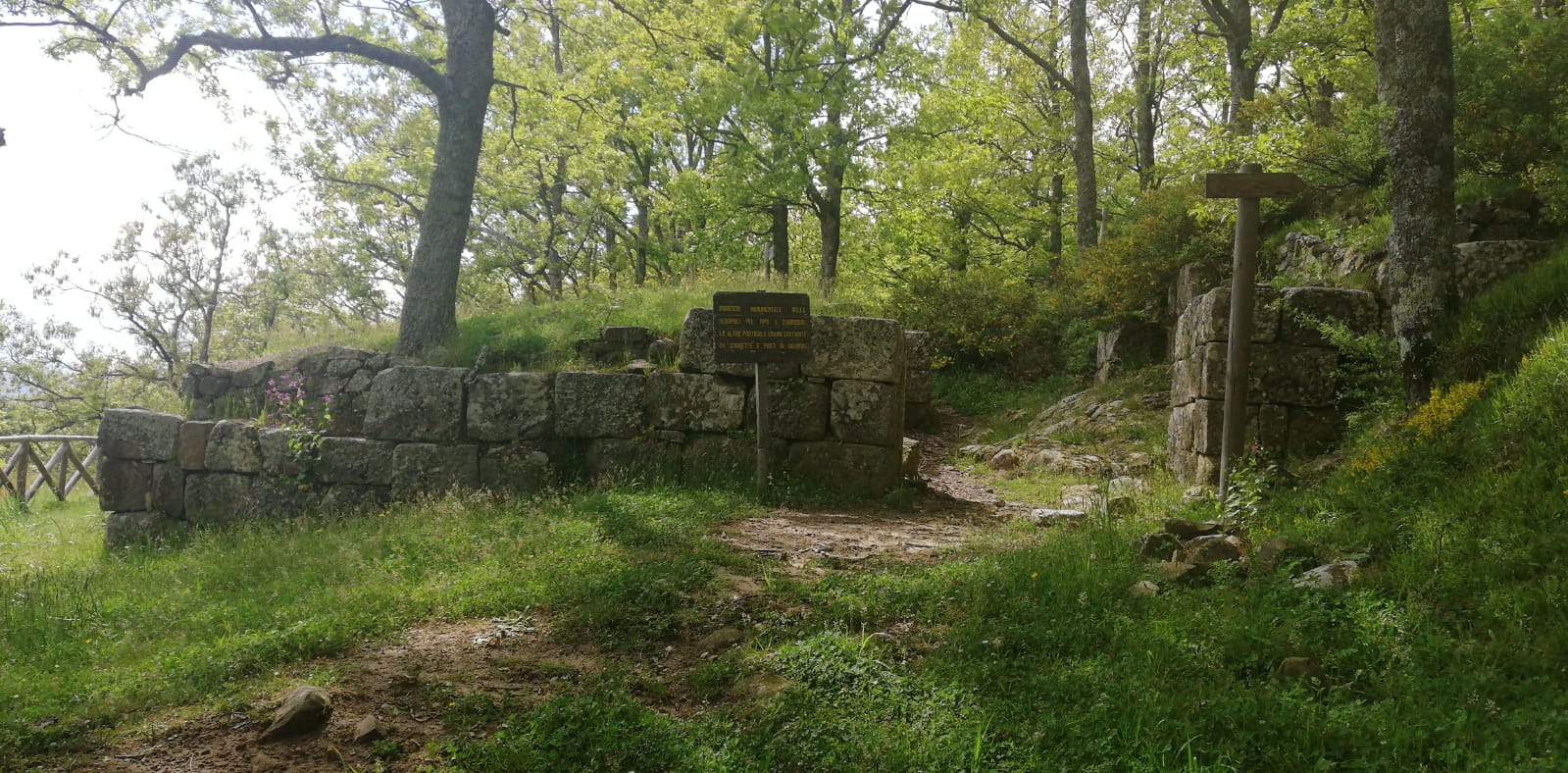
Remains of the ancient Osco-Samnite settlement of Croccia-Cognato, located near Mount Croccia, in Basilicata region

A people called the Aurunci by Livy appear the earliest in history. In 503 BC, the Latin colonies of Cora and Pometia rebelled against Roman authority, obtaining the assistance of the Aurunci, seat unknown. Two consular armies sent against them won after a hard-fought battle in which "many more were killed than were taken prisoners; the prisoners were everywhere butchered, even the hostages ... fell a victim to the enemy's bloodthirsty rage". The enemy fell back on Pometia, which was besieged by the Romans. The Aurunci sallied out, burned the siege towers, massacred the troops and grievously wounded one of the consuls. The Romans withdrew but returned later in greater force. Taking the town, they beheaded the Aurunci officers, sold the Pometians into slavery, levelled the buildings and put the land up for sale.

The Aurunci appear one more time in the early republic in a failed attempt to support the Volsci in their struggle against Rome. In 495 BC, putting an army on the march for Rome, they sent envoys ahead to demand the withdrawal of the Romans from Volscian territory. The consul Publius Servilus Priscus Structus met them on the march at Arricia and "in one battle finished the war". No more is heard of the Oscans for almost a century.

=== Conflict and subjugation ===
In the last half of the 4th century BC, the remaining Oscan populations (who were not Samnites) lived in three sovereign states: the Sidicini, the Aurunci and the Ausones. The Sidicini's capital city was Teanum, which minted its own coins bearing inscriptions in the Oscan language. The town of Cales was the capital of the Ausones.

==== Volscian war ====
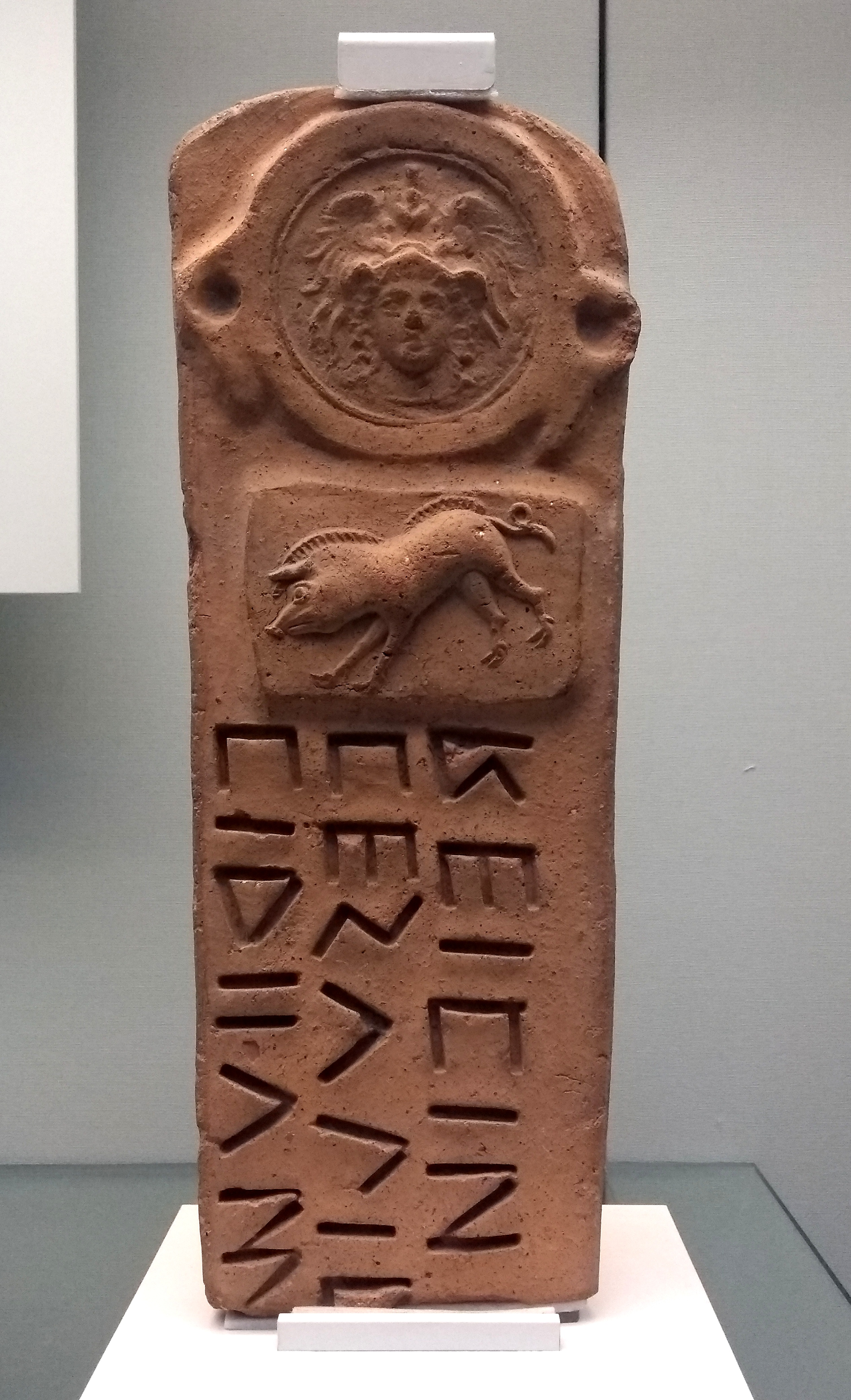
Oscan inscription with relief on a terracotta artifact, first half of the 3rd century BC, found in a tomb near Capua, exhibited in the British Museum

The beginning of the end of Oscan sovereignty was their attempted exploitation of an opportunity to maraud against the Romans in the period of instability following a major victory against the Volsci, a tribe occupying the Volsci Mountains overlooking and including the Pontine Marshes. During the final revolt of the Volsci, the Romans had sacked and levelled Satricum about 346 BC and had sold the remaining 4,000 fighting men into slavery. For whatever reasons, the Aurunci chose this moment to send a marauding expedition against the Romans. Panic ensued in the city. The senators saw a wider conspiracy with the Latin League. They appointed Lucius Furius Camillus dictator, halted business, drafted an army on the spot and sent it into the field against the Aurunci, but "the war was finished in the very first battle". The Romans used the army to complete the conquest of the Volsci at Sora.

==== First Samnite War ====
The Samnites in 343 BC "made an unprovoked attack upon the Sidicini", who appealed to Campania for military assistance and received it. After losing two battles and being penned within Capua, the Campanians offered themselves to Rome with tears and prostrations in the Senate House. The Senate accepted the offer and granted assistance on the grounds that Campania would be an ally in the rear of the Aequi and Volsci in case of further conflict with them. When Roman envoys presented the Samnite Senate with demands for withdrawal from Campania, the answer was no; moreover, the envoys were allowed to hear staged orders of Samnite commanders to their troops to march on Campania immediately. So began the First Samnite War (343–341 BC).

The Roman Senate declared war, the people ratified the declaration, and two consular armies were sent into Samnium and Campania respectively. For two years the Romans knew only victories until at last the Samnites sued for the restoration of their former alliance with one condition: they would be free to war on the Sidicini if they wished. The Romans had an agreement with Campania, but none with the Sidicini. The Senate bought peace by ratifying the treaty and paying off their army.

==== Latin War ====
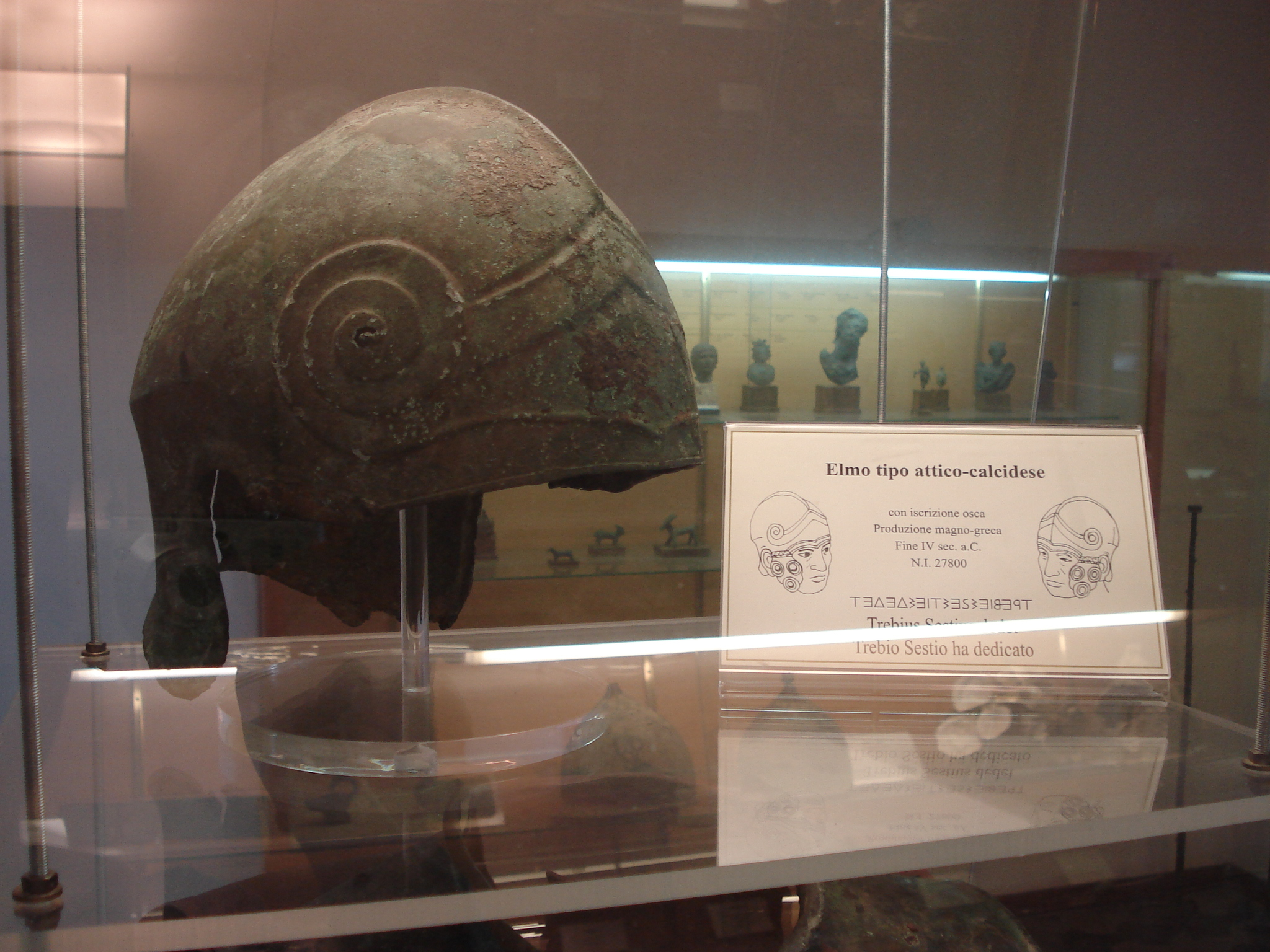
Magna Graecia helmet in bronze, with inscription in Oscan language, Antonino Salinas Regional Archaeological Museum

The Samnites used their army to attack the Sidicini again. In desperation, the latter offered themselves to Rome but were turned down on the grounds that they were too late. The Sidicini allied with a force being raised by the Latin League against the Samnites. They were joined by the Campanians. A multi-national army began to devastate Samnium. The Samnites now appealed to Rome under the terms of their treaty, asking if in fact, Rome was sovereign over Campania. The Romans disavowed any agreement that would restrain the Campanians and Latins from making war on whomever else they pleased.

Encouraged by Roman refusal to assume leadership, the Latins made plans to turn their army against Rome once the Samnite threat had been neutralized. Word of the plans leaked to the Romans, who reacted by inviting ten Latin chiefs to Rome to receive orders under the terms of the treaty. As the price for submitting to Rome, the Latins demanded a new common government, with one consul and half the Senate to be elected from the Latins. When Titus Manlius Torquatus, one of the consuls for 340 BC, heard these conditions, he swore by Jupiter's statue that if the Senate accepted them he would kill every Latin in the Senate House with drawn sword. Emotional posturing began around the statue; a Latin envoy, Lucius Annaeus, slipped on the stairs while railing against Jupiter and hit his head, becoming unconscious. At that moment, a thunderstorm burst on the Senate House. Interpreting these events as a sign the Romans declared war on the Latins and their allies and allied themselves with the Samnites. The two years of conflict, 340–338, is known as the Latin War.

In a number of legendary battles, the Romans defeated the Latin League, taking away the sovereignty of its tribal states, who subsequently assimilated to Rome. The consul, Lucius Furius Camillus, asked the Senate: "Do you wish to adopt ruthless measures against a people that have surrendered and been defeated? ... Or do you wish to follow the example of your ancestors and make Rome greater by conferring her citizenship on those whom she has defeated?" The Senate chose to offer different terms to different Latin cities. Colonists were placed throughout Latium.

==== Fall of Cales ====
The Aurunci and Sidicini, who had been perforce in the Latin camp, received separate treaties from Rome. In 337, the Sidicini attacked the Aurunci for no reason given by Livy. The Roman Senate decided that the terms of the latter's treaty warranted military intervention, but meanwhile the Aurunci abandoned their towns in Campania in favour of a mountain stronghold, Suessa, which they renamed Aurunca. Further events escalated the conflict: the Ausones of Cales joined the Sidicini. In 335, the Romans sent a consular army under Marcus Valerius Corvus to lay siege to Cales. Informed by an escaped prisoner (who broke his chains and climbed the wall in plain sight without being observed) that the enemy were all drunk and sleeping, Corvus took the city in a night-time rout and garrisoned it. The Senate voted to send 2,500 colonists, to whom enemy land was distributed. The Ausoni were never again sovereign.

==== Peace with the Sidicini and Aurunci ====
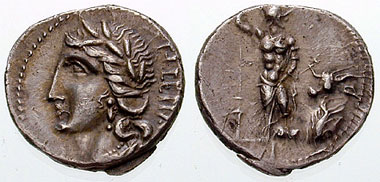
Denarius of Marsican Confederation with Oscan legend

After the fall of Cales, both consular armies were sent against the Sidicini, who fortified themselves in Teanum with a large army. Livy does not reveal the outcome of this campaign. The Romans were struck by a plague (the most typical plague in the region was malaria, carried by the marsh mosquitos); both consuls were relieved for suspicion of impiety, but the Roman army remained among the Sidicini. Livy changes the topic to relations with the Samnites in preparation for his account of the Second Samnite War (326–304 BC). The Sidicini do not appear in that war or ever again in history, but Teanum goes on as Teanum Sidicinum and its territory as Sidicinus ager. If the Romans had fought a great battle and had obliterated the Sidicini there would be some mention of it or some evidence of a discontinuity at Teano. Instead, the city prospers. Smith accords with the general conclusion that between 335 and 326, most likely in 334, the Sidicini consented to lay down their arms and become part of the greater Roman municipality. Livy's omission remains unexplained.

The Aurunci similarly disappeared from tradition after they became subject to Rome. After the Samnites were pacified, the region kept the peace and was prosperous. It was a popular vacation spot, being on high ground away from the pestilential air, which today is recognized to be the malaria mosquito.

==== Vestiges of the Oscans at Rome ====
Their debauchery was adopted by the larger Roman society over time, and the term Osci loqui or Obsci loqui came to mean licentious or lewd language. Another vestige of the Oscans at Rome was the Atellan Farce, also known as the Oscan Games, which were masked improvised farces in Ancient Rome. The Oscan athletic games were very popular, and usually preceded by longer pantomime plays.

== Religion ==
Like other Italic religions, the Oscans propitiated Mars (Oscan: Mamars) and worshipped the sky-god Jupiter (Oscan: iúveí) as the chief deity within their pantheon. In the Oscan Tablet of Agnone, numerous deities are mentioned as epithets of Ceres (Oscan: kerrí). For instance, the goddess Proserpina is presumably to be identified with the Futreí Kerríiaí, or "daughter of Ceres," mentioned in the Agnone Tablet. Archaeological evidence reveals that ceramics, weapons, and — beginning during the 4th century BCE — terracotta female statuettes were common votive offerings in Oscan temples. During the 3rd century BCE, a new yet rare style of anatomical ex-voto offerings appears in Oscan sanctuaries, possibly due to the influence of similar artifacts that are more widespread in Latium. It is likely that the animal sacrifice was a prominent part of religious life and cultic ritual in Oscan culture.

== See also ==
- Oscan language
- Ancient peoples of Italy
- Prehistoric Italy
- Ausones

== Sources ==
- Cancik, Hubert; Helmuth Schneider, eds. (2003). "Oscans". Brill's New Pauly Encyclopedia of the Ancient World. Vol. II. Leiden: Brill Academic Publisher. ISBN 90-04-12259-1.
- Caspari, M.O.B. (1911). "The Etruscans and the Sicilian Expedition of 414–413 B.C." The Classical Quarterly. 5 (2): 113–115. doi:10.1017/S0009838800019467. JSTOR 636050. S2CID 170932168.
- Hornblower, Simon; Spawforth, Anthony, eds. (2003). Oxford Classical Dictionary (Revised) (3rd ed.). Oxford: Oxford University Press. ISBN 0-19-866172-X.
- de Cazanove, Olivier; Dupraz, Emmanuel (2024). "Religions and Religiosity in Italy". In Maiuro, Marco; Johnson, Jane Botsford (eds.). The Oxford Handbook of Pre-Roman Italy (1000-49 BCE). Oxford University Press. ISBN 978-0-19-998789-4.
- Linderski, Jerzy (March 7, 2016). "Religion, Italic". Oxford Classical Dictionary. Oxford University Press.
- Livy (1990). "History of Rome". In Lewis, Naphtali; Reinhold, Meyer (eds.). Roman Civilization: The Republic and the Augustan Age. Vol. I (3rd ed.). New York: Columbia University Press. pp. 81–85. ISBN 0-231-07131-0.
- Smith, William, ed. (1854). "Aurunci, Ausones". Dictionary of Greek and Roman Geography. Volume. Vol. I. Boston: Little, Brown & Company.
