= Roccamonfina =

- Comune
- Comune di Roccamonfina
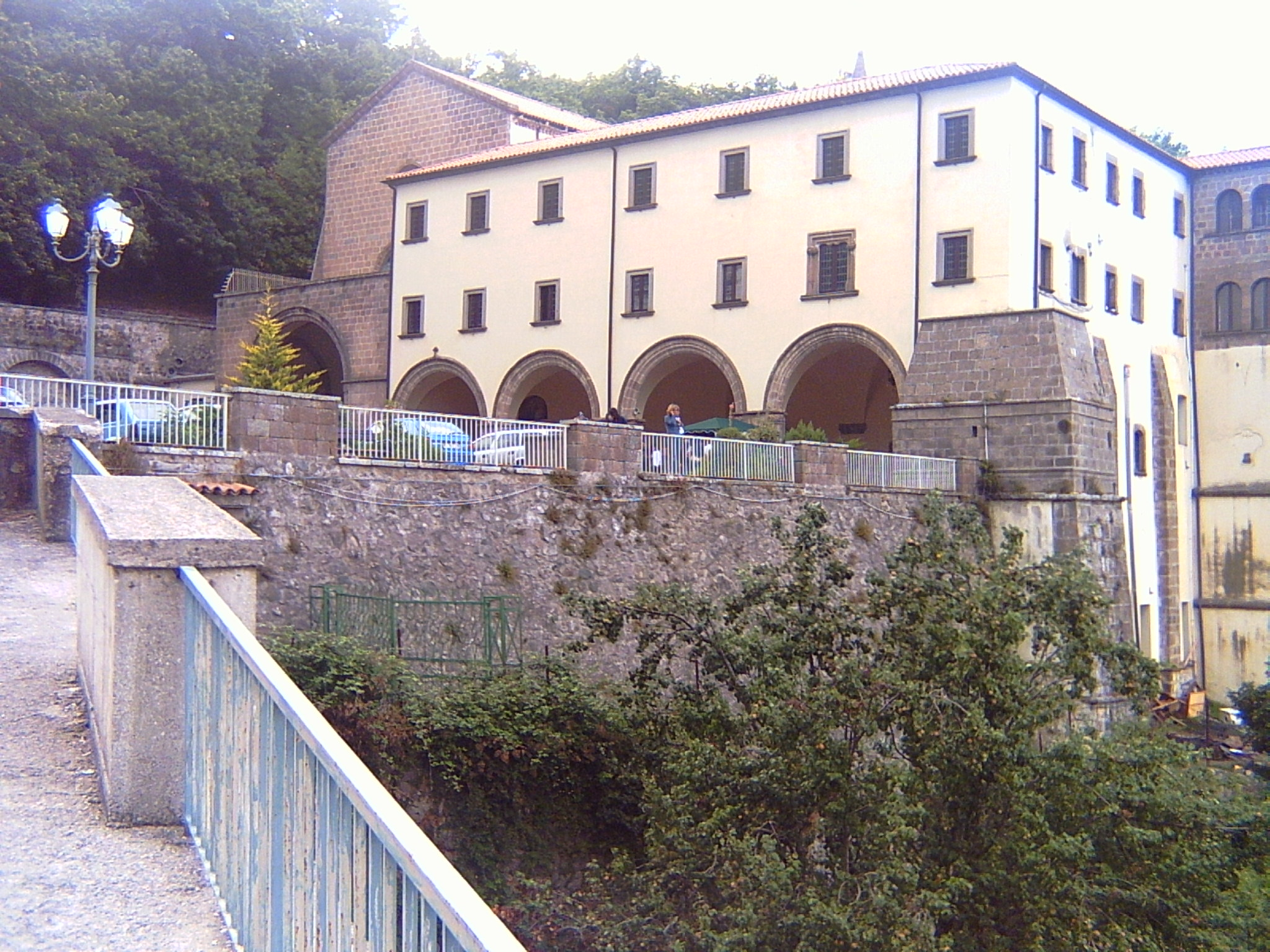
- Sanctuary of the Lattani.

- Coat of arms

- Location within Italy Location within Campania
- Coordinates: 41°18′N 13°59′E
- Country: Italy
- Region: Campania
- Province: Caserta (CE)
- Frazioni: Ausoni, Cari, Cembali, Cese, Filorsi, Fontanafredda, Gallo, Garofali, Gigloli, San Domenico, Tavola, Torano, Tuorisichi, Tuoro di Tavola

Government
  - Mayor: Carlo Montefusco

Area
  - Total: 31.04 km^{2} (11.98 sq mi)
- Elevation: 612 m (2,008 ft)

Population (31 December 2015)
  - Total: 3,511
  - Density: 113.1/km^{2} (293.0/sq mi)
- Time zone: UTC+1 (CET)
  - Summer (DST): UTC+2 (CEST)
- Postal code: 81035
- Dialing code: 0823
- Patron saint: St. Anthony
- Saint day: Last Tuesday in May and last Sunday in August
- Website: Official website

Roccamonfina is a comune (municipality) in the Province of Caserta in the Italian region Campania, located about 60 kilometres (37 mi) northwest of Naples and about 40 kilometres (25 mi) northwest of Caserta.

In the communal territory is the extinct volcano of Roccamonfina. The fossil human footprints called Ciampate del Diavolo have been found there. The town is surrounded by dense groves of sweet chestnut trees.

== History ==
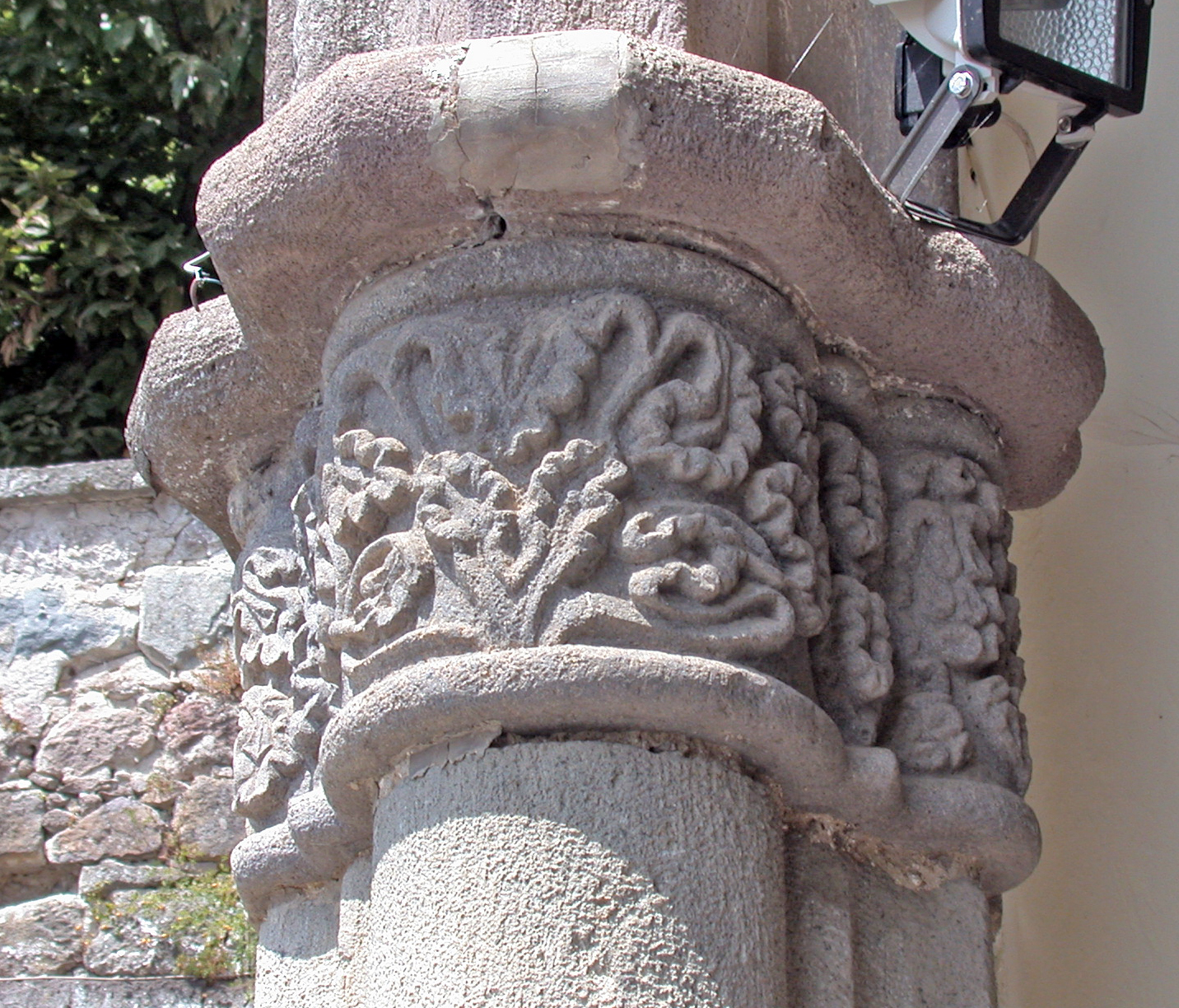
Capital at the entrance of the Santa Maria dei Lattani sanctuary.

In the territory of the volcano are traces of Ausonian or Auruncan settlements, with remains of polygonal walls dating to the 6th-5th century BC. Findings of coins and inscriptions seem to confirm the presence of a settlement in the current town as early as the 3rd century BC, although it is mentioned only in the 10th century AD.

In the Middle Ages and the modern era it was a fief of Neapolitan and Papal noble families, while under the Bourbon rulers it was a direct possession of the crown of the Two Sicilies.

== Main sights ==
Roccamonfina's main attraction is the sanctuary of Maria Santissima dei Lattani, founded in 1430 by St. Bernardino of Siena and St. James of the Marches and enlarged to the current shape in 1448–1507. The façade has a large portico with the original wooden door from 1507. The interior has a nave with no aisles, and 15th and 17th centuries frescoes. The Chapel of the Virgin of the Lattani has a statue of "Madonna with Child", dating perhaps to the 9th century. The convent has a two-storey cloister.

The Collegiate church of Santa Maria Maggiore is of medieval origin, but its current appearance dates to the 1715 restoration. In the same square is the Palazzo Colletta.
