= Santa Maria di Correano, Ausonia =

Church in Ausonia, Lazio, Italy

Santa Maria di Correano is a Romanesque style, Roman Catholic church in the town of Ausonia, province of Frosinone, region of Lazio, Italy.

== History ==
The church was erected at the site of a former ancient Roman villa, located outside of the town, on the slopes of Monte Fammera. The structure includes spolia from the site. The interiors house a medieval frescoes of San Nicola, the Madonna and Child, and Christ calming the Storm.
