= Sanctuary of the Madonna del Piano, Ausonia =

Church in Ausonia, Lazio, Italy

Coordinates: 41°20′48.9″N 13°45′03.0″E

The Sanctuary of the Madonna del Piano (Madonna of the Plain) is a Roman Catholic church in the town of Ausonia, province of Frosinone, region of Lazio, Italy.

== History ==
The building was known as the Sanctuary of the Fratte (Friars or Franciscan monks). The present church layout was built in the 15th century, but stands atop an older romanesque style crypt with frescoes commissioned by Benedictine monks. The frescoes depict topics for popular devotion including a Miracle of Remingarda which recounts the legend of a young local female shepherd who had a Marian vision, leading to the erection here of the sanctuary. The church has a venerated painted wooden icon of the Madonna and Child. The child is said to have miraculously appeared in the vicinity.
