= Aurunci =

Italic tribe in Ancient Italy

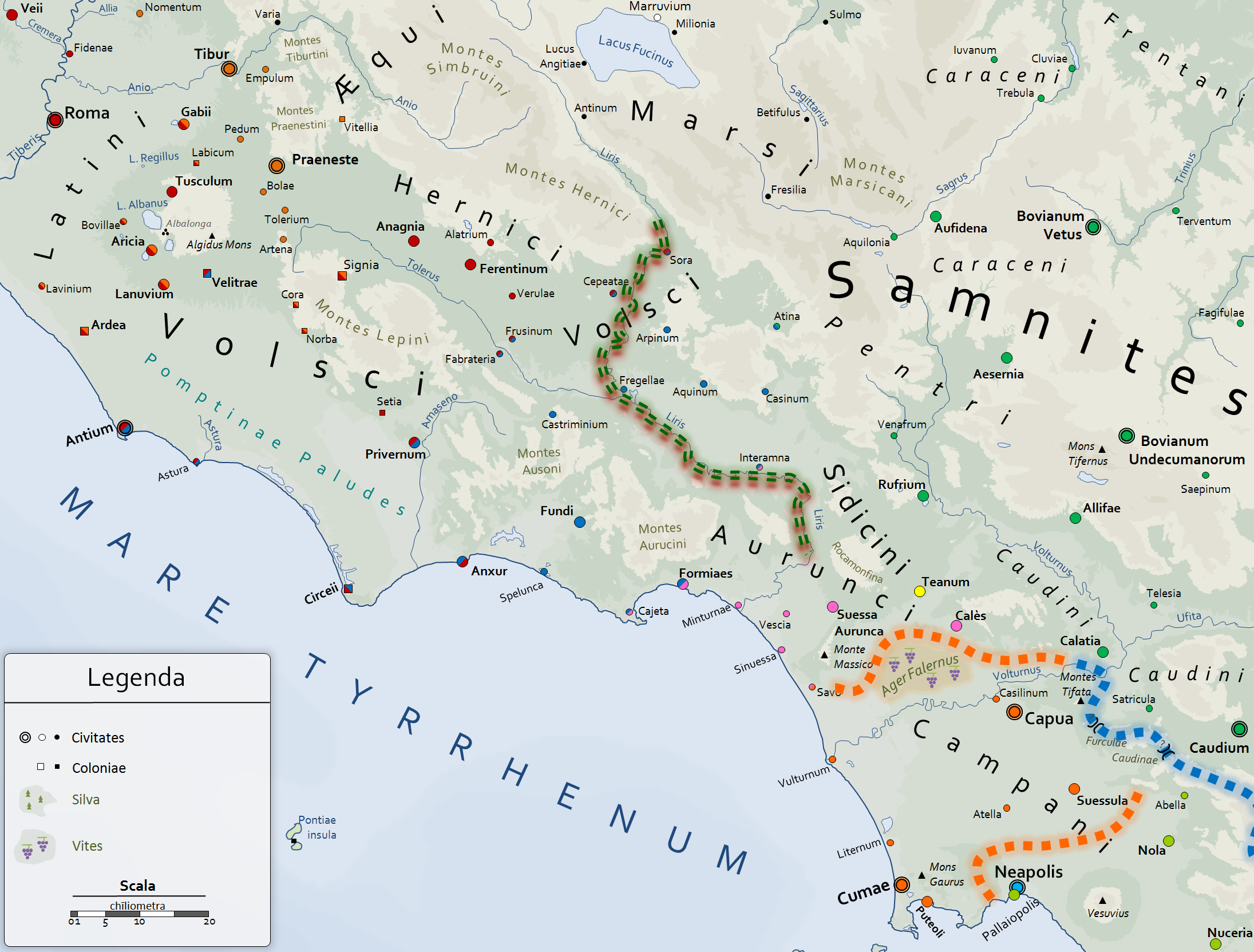
Map showing the territory of the Aurunci.

The Aurunci were an Italic tribe that lived in southern Italy from around the 1st millennium BC. They were eventually defeated by Rome and subsumed into the Roman Republic during the second half of the 4th century BC.

== Identity ==
Aurunci is the name given by Roman writers to an ancient race or nation of Italy. It appears that "Aurunci" was the appellation the Romans gave to the people called "Ausones" by the Greeks. One form might be derived from the other by rhotacism (corruption of sound "s" in "r") (Ausoni > Auroni > Auronici > Aurunci).

The identity of the two is distinctly asserted by Servius, and clearly implied by Cassius Dio, where he says that the name of Ausonia was properly applied only to the land of the Auruncans, between the Volscians and the Campanians. In like manner, Festus makes the mythical hero Auson the founder of the city of Aurunea. Servius terms the Aurunci one of the most ancient nations of Italy. They appear to have been much more powerful and widely spread at an early period than we subsequently find them, but it does not appear that the name was ever employed by the Romans in the vague and extended sense in which "Ausones" was used by the Greeks.

At a later period, in the fourth century BC, the two names of Aurunci and Ausones had assumed a distinct signification, and came to be applied to two petty nations, evidently mere subdivisions of the same great race, both dwelling on the frontiers of Latium and Campania; the Ausones on the west of the Liris, extending from there to the mountains of the Volscians; the Auruncans, on the other hand, being confined to the detached group of volcanic mountains now called Monte Santa Croce, or Rocca Monfina, on the left bank of the Liris, together with the hills that slope from there towards the sea. Their ancient stronghold or metropolis, Aurunca was situated near the summit of the mountain, while Suessa, which they subsequently made their capital, was on its south-western slope, commanding the fertile plains from there to the sea. On the east and south they bordered closely on the Sidicini of Teanum and the people of Cales, who, according to Livy, were also of Ausonian race, but were politically distinct from the Auruncans. Virgil evidently regards these hills as the original abode of the Auruncan, and speaks of them as merely a petty people.

In contrast, in 495 BC, Dionysius of Halicarnassus refers to them as being a warlike people of great strength and fierceness, who occupied the fairest plains of Campania; so that it seems certain the name is here used as including the people to whom the name of Ausones (in its more limited sense) is afterwards applied.

== History ==
The first occasion in which they appear in Roman history exhibits them as a warlike and powerful nation who had extended their conquests to the borders of Latium.

Livy tells us that in 503 and 502 BC, the Latin cities of Cora and Pometia revolted and allied themselves with the Aurunci. These powerful neighbours supported them with a large army against the infant republic; however, Rome ultimately prevailed. A few years later, in 495 BC, at around the time of a Volscian attack upon Rome, the Aurunci took up arms against Rome in support of the Volscian cause, and advanced with their army as far as Aricia, where they were defeated by the Roman consul Publius Servilius Priscus Structus.

From this time, the name of the Aurunci does not again occur until 344 BC, when it is evident that Livy is speaking only of the people who inhabited the mountain of Rocca Monfina, who were defeated and reduced to submission without difficulty. A few years later (337 BC), they were compelled by the attacks of their neighbours, the Sidicini, to apply to Rome for aid, and meanwhile abandoned their stronghold on the mountain and established themselves in their new city of Suessa.

No mention of their name is found in the subsequent Roman wars in this part of Italy. In 313 BC, a Roman colony was established at Suessa; their national existence must have been thenceforth at an end. Their territory was subsequently included in Campania.

== Legacy ==
The Aurunci mountains and the modern town of Sessa Aurunca bears the Aurunci's name.

== See also ==
- Ausones
- Aurunca
- Osci
- List of ancient Italic peoples
- Coinage of Suessa
