= Roccamonfina (volcano) =

Volcano in Italy

Coordinates: 41.29356341°N 13.969195°E

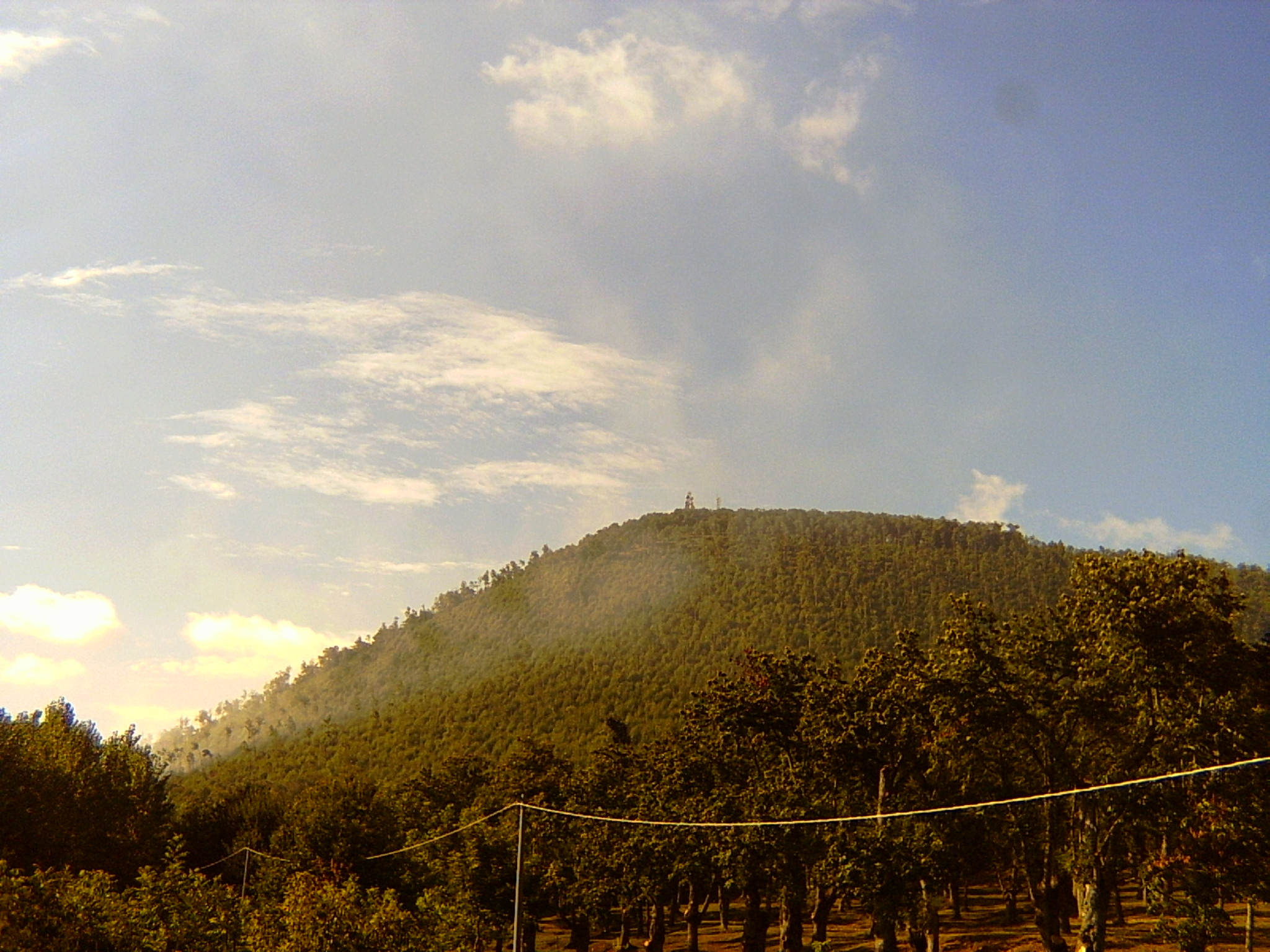
View of the Monte Santa Croce.

The Volcano of Roccamonfina is an extinct/inactive volcano in Roccamonfina, Campania, southern Italy. It was active from some 650,000 to 50,000 years ago. It comprises an isolated large cone of some 25 km (16 mi) perimeter between the Monti Aurunci, the plain and valley of the Garigliano, the Monte Massico and the Monti Trebulani. The central caldera has a diameter of nearly 6 km (4 mi) and the small commune (town) of Roccamonfina is located inside it. Volcanic activity is now replaced by minor seismic movements and by the presence of mineral waters. The mount is part of the Roccamonfina-Garigliano Mouth Regional Park, created in 1999.

The Ciampate del Diavolo are a series of hominid footprints in solidified ash from an eruption of the volcano 345,000 years ago.

== Geology ==
The volcano originated as a stratovolcano in the Garigliano rift valley, with a group of eruptive mouths spread in a 1,000 km^{2} (386 sq mi) area; later an effusive activity concentrated in the central area, forming a volcanic cone some 1,800 m-high, mostly formed of tephra and accompanied by minor cones such as the Monte Ofelio at south-west. Some 400,000 years ago, the collapse of the volcano's eastern sector formed a caldera which, for some time, was occupied by a volcanic lake.

A second period of volcanic activity began some 385,000 years ago with an explosive eruption, including eruptions from the former caldera. This phase continued until some 285,000 years ago. The formation of the volcano also modified the course of the Garigliano and Volturno rivers. The Volturno moved southwest in what is its current course; the Garigliano no longer reached the sea, and formed a lake (Lake Lirino) until (around 200,000 years ago) it eroded rocks near Suio and assumed the current course.

Although there are current records of no eruptions, geological process varies and pleistocene volcanoes once thought extinct may rejuvenate. However, based on current scientific study, it exhibits there are no current magmatic ongoing activity or seismic unrest hence the eruption index is quite low. However, being extinct is a relatively vague term, as it is too young in terms of geological epoch.
