= Ciampate del Diavolo =

Location of fossilized hominid footprints in Campania, Italy

Coordinates: 41°19′57.04″N 14°01′28.65″E

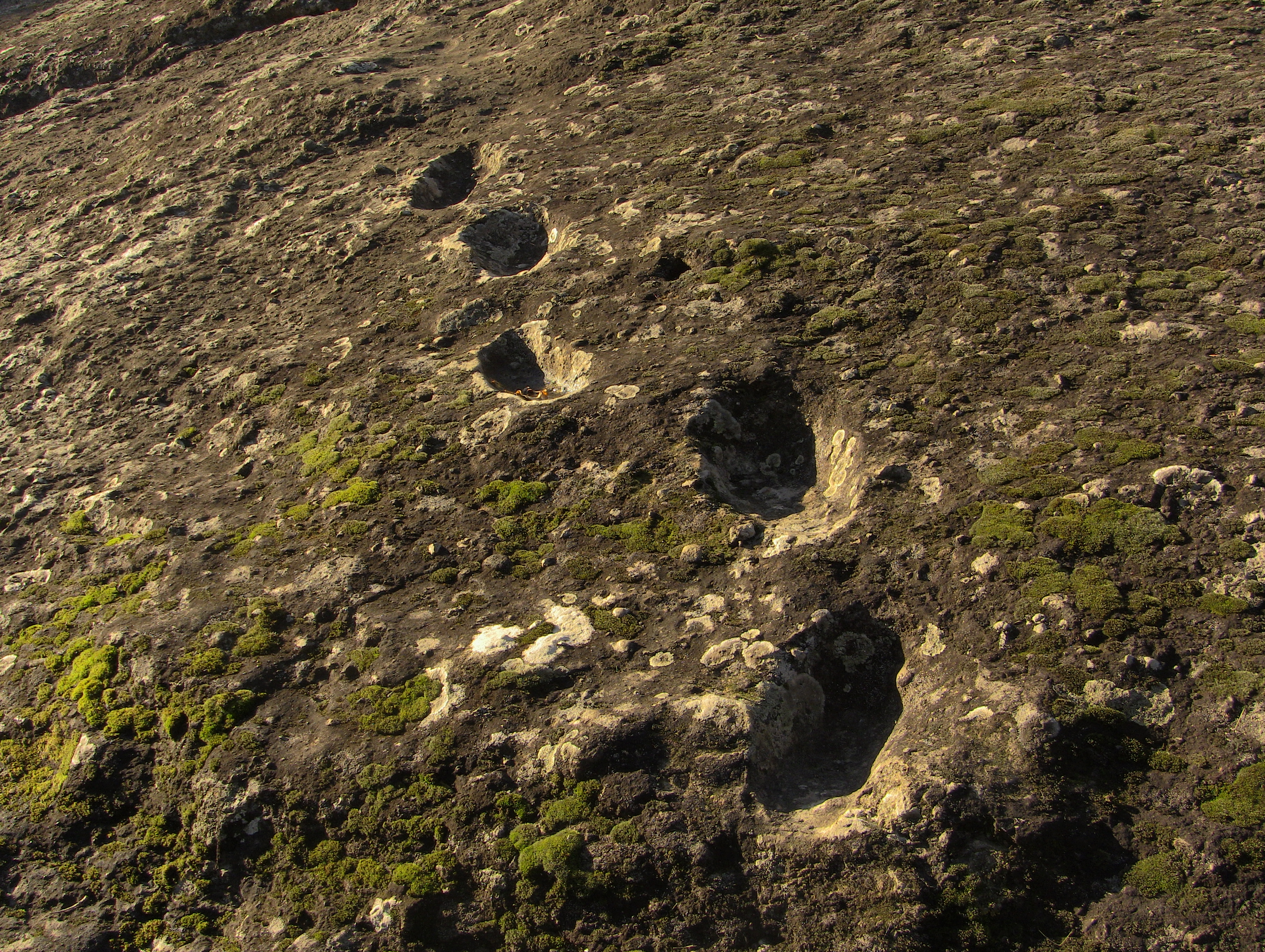
The Ciampate del Diavolo

The Ciampate del Diavolo (Neapolitan: "Devil's Footprints" or "Devil's Trails") is a locality near the extinct Roccamonfina volcano in northern Campania, Italy. It is named after fossilised footprints preserved in pyroclastic flow deposits that have been dated to around 350,000 years ago. They have been attributed to bipedal hominids, possibly Homo heidelbergensis, which is known to have inhabited the region at the time.

The footprints comprise three sets of tracks indicating that three hominids made their way down a steep slope on the flank of the volcano, away from the crater. The tracks were preserved under a layer of volcanic ash and were revealed by erosion, probably in the late 18th to early 19th century. Local people attributed the prints to the Devil as they regarded him as the only being capable of walking on lava without harm. They were identified as hominid footprints after archaeologists examined them in 2002 and are the second oldest set of hominid footprints known outside Africa, after the Happisburgh footprints.

== Description ==
The area in which the tracks appear is an eroded layer of rock covering about 2,000 m^{2}, tilted at an angle of about 45°, in a forest on the side of the volcano. The footprints consist of three sets of tracks which descend a steep slope created by a pyroclastic flow. The first, identified as Trackway A, measures 13.4 metres (44 ft) and consists of 27 prints from left and right feet descending 4.26 metres (14.0 ft) vertically along a Z-shaped course. It testifies to a careful descent down a steep and probably unstable slope. Trackway B is 8.6 metres (28 ft) long and descends 2.91 metres (9.5 ft) vertically along a single curved route. Less care was taken with this part of the descent, as slips and irregularities indicating stumbles are visible. Finally, the less well-preserved Trackway C measures 9.98 metres (32.7 ft) along a single straight line which descends 2.56 metres (8.4 ft) vertically. Occasional handprints are visible where the track-maker sought support on the steep slope, and a couple of animal paw marks made by a big dog or wolf are also visible.

== Age and origins ==
Until the discovery of the Happisburgh footprints in England in 2013, they were the oldest known hominid footprints outside Africa. The tracks were originally dated to between 385,000 and 325,000 years ago, but subsequent studies using argon–argon dating placed the date more precisely as around 349–350,000 years ago. The pyroclastic deposits in which the footprints were imprinted were laid down around 349,000 years ago (±3,000 years), while the layer of volcanic ash which subsequently covered and preserved them was deposited around 350,000 years ago (±3,000 years). The footprints are thought to have been exposed by erosion caused by heavy precipitation and landslides in the early 19th century, when the name Ciampate del Diavolo was first recorded.

The track-makers are estimated to have been about 1.56 metres (5.1 ft) tall and to have been travelling at a speed of 1.09 metres (3.6 ft) per second. Based on the age of the tracks, they have been tentatively ascribed to the hominid Homo heidelbergensis, a probable ancestor of the Neanderthals. As the tracks point away from the volcano's crater, it is possible that they were made while the track-makers were trying to escape an eruption. There was certainly an eruption following the track-makers' passage, as the tracks were buried under a subsequently erupted layer of volcanic ash which preserved them to the present day.

Based on the small stature of the individuals, it has been suggested that the prints were made by children.

== Investigations ==
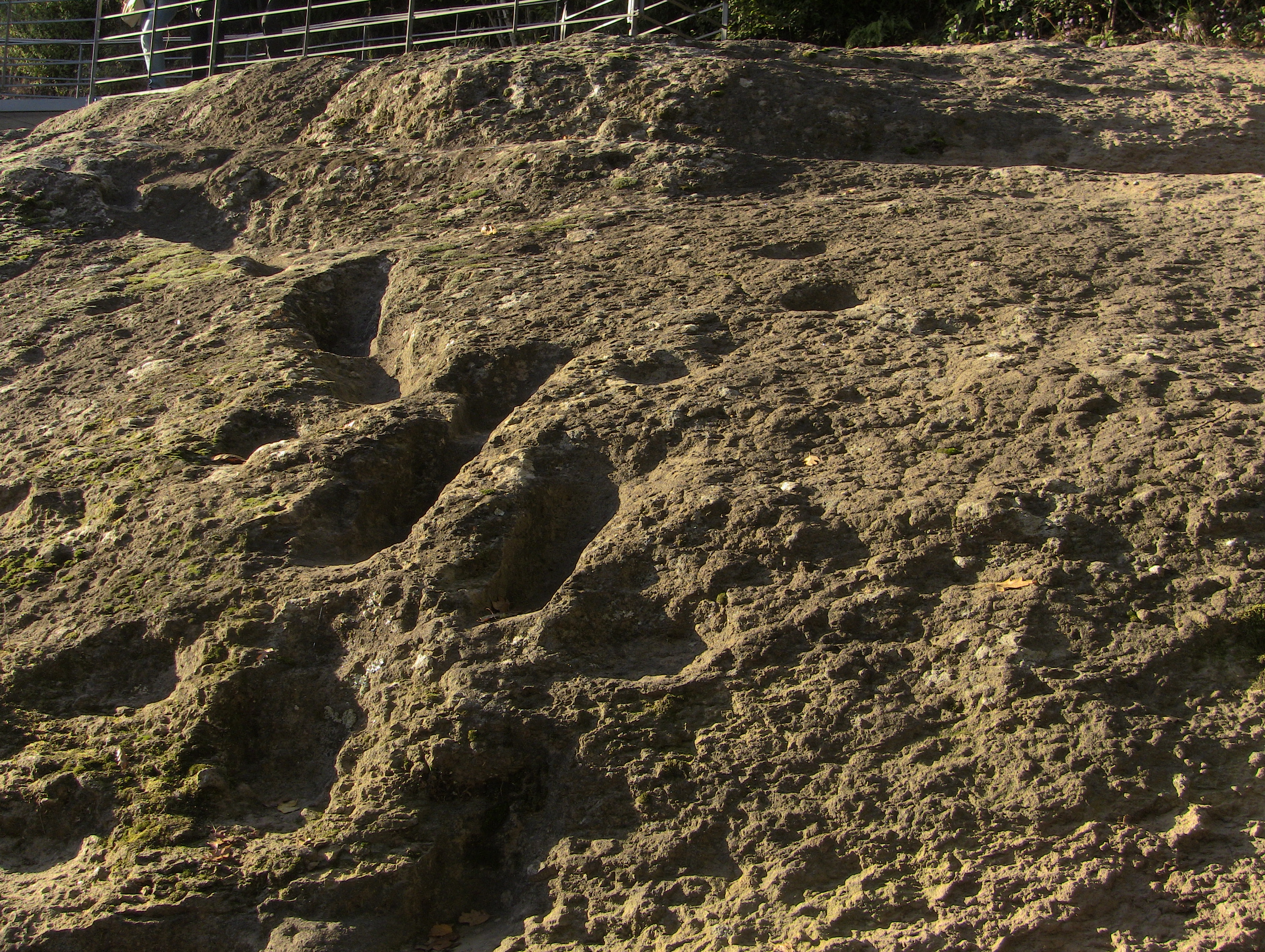
View of the footprints with walkway above

The tracks were known locally for many years, as they are situated near a trail that was established in the 18th century between the villages of Tuoro/Foresta and Piccilli. Local people attributed them to the Devil, the only being considered capable of walking on lava without burning his feet, but despite this the site was not considered cursed or threatening. In 1986 a writer suggested that the footprints might have been created in historic times by a human. It was not until 2002 that they were first brought to scientific attention by two amateur archaeologists who noticed them and informed archaeologists at the University of Padua.

A cattle path through the forest formerly crossed the fossil tracks and caused accelerated erosion at that point, but since 2001 the vegetation around the tracks has been cleared away and the exposed rock protected by fencing. The tracks were initially thought to have been made by prehistoric elephants but when Paolo Mietto and two other researchers from the University of Padua investigated them, they were surprised to find that the tracks were of hominid origin. It is very rare to find preserved hominid footprints in open-air environments, where they are vulnerable to erosion; most examples are found in enclosed and thus better protected environments such as caves.

== See also ==
- Laetoli footprints
- Paleoanthropology
