= Teano =

- Comune
- Comune di Teano
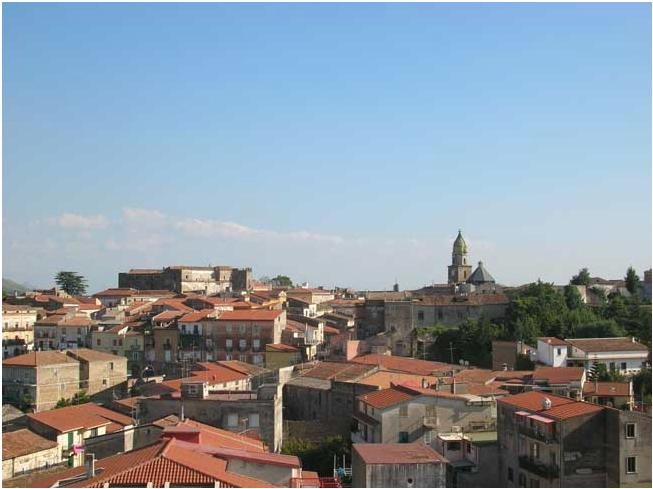

- Location within Italy Location within Campania
- Coordinates: 41°15′N 14°04′E
- Country: Italy
- Region: Campania
- Province: Caserta (CE)
- Frazioni: Borgonuovo, Cappelle, Carbonara, Casafredda, Casale, Casamostra, Casi, Cipriani, Fontanelle, Furnolo, Gloriani, Magnano, Maiorisi, Pugliano, San Giulianeta, San Giuliano, San Marco, Santa Maria Versano, Taverna Zarone, Teano Scalo, Tranzi, Tuoro, Versano

Government
  - Mayor: Giovanni Scoglio

Area
  - Total: 89.43 km^{2} (34.53 sq mi)
- Elevation: 196 m (643 ft)

Population (31 August 2015)
  - Total: 12,593
  - Density: 140.8/km^{2} (364.7/sq mi)
- Demonym: Teanesi
- Time zone: UTC+1 (CET)
  - Summer (DST): UTC+2 (CEST)
- Postal code: 81057
- Dialing code: 0823
- Website: Official website

Teano is a town and comune in the province of Caserta, Campania, southern Italy, 30 kilometres (19 mi) northwest of Caserta on the main line to Rome from Naples. It stands at the southeast foot of an extinct volcano, Rocca Monfina. Its St. Clement's cathedral is the see of the Roman Catholic Diocese of Teano-Calvi, which started as the Diocese of Teano circa AD 300.

== History ==
=== Ancient times and Middle Ages ===
The ancient Teanum Sidicinum was the capital of the Oscan tribe of the Sidicini, which drove the Aurunci from Roccamonfina. They probably submitted to Rome in 334 BC and their troops were grouped with those of Campania in the Roman army. Thus the garrison of Regium, which in 280 attacked the citizens, consisted of one cohort of Sidicini and two of Campanians. Like Cales, Teanum continued to have the right of coinage, and, like Suessa and Cales, remained faithful to Rome in both the Hannibalic and the Social wars. Its position gave it some military importance, and it was apparently made a colony by Claudius, not by Augustus. Strabo speaks of it as the most important town on the Via Latina, joined by a branch road from Suessa, of which remains still exist, and which continued east to Alife.

In the 4th century Teano became seat of a diocese, and was later an important Lombard county, as part of the Duchy of Benevento. The Benedictines had several properties in the city, where the monks from Montecassino took refuge when their abbey was destroyed in 883. Here one of the first document of vulgare Italian was issued in 963.

=== "Handshake of Teano" ===
Teano was the site of the famous meeting of 26 October 1860, between Italian nationalist fighter Giuseppe Garibaldi and Victor Emanuel II, the King of Sardinia. Having wrested the Kingdom of the Two Sicilies from the Neapolitan Bourbons, Garibaldi shook Victor Emanuel's hand and hailed him as King of Italy. Thus, Garibaldi sacrificed republican hopes for the sake of Italian unity under a monarchy. The event is a popular subject for Italian patriotic statues and paintings.

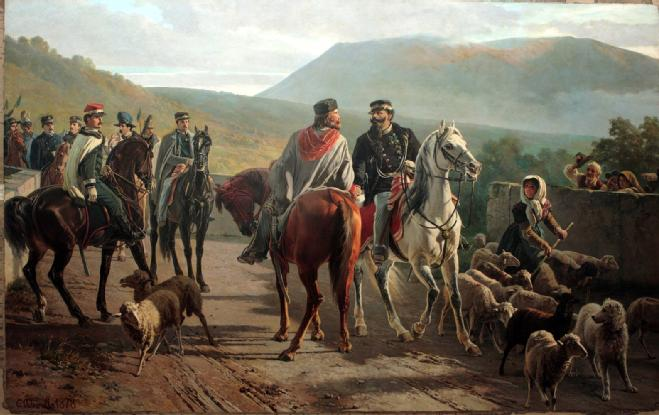
The Handshake of Teano, by Carlo Ademollo

== Main sights ==
- Roman remains of Teano include the theater (2nd century BC, rebuilt in the 2nd century AD), once one of the greatest in Italy with its 85 m of diameter, some extensive baths (Le Caldarelle) containing several statues, and some Roman dwellings. A tomb with a Christian mosaic representing the visit of the Three Wise Men to Bethlehem was found in 1907. Of the famous amphitheater, cited by several sources, no traces remain.
- Cathedral of St Clement (also called San Giovanni Ante Portam Latinam), begun around 1050 and completed in 1116, using Corinthian columns obtained from the ruins of the ancient town. It has a basilica plant with a nave and two aisles. After a fire, the church was rebuilt in 1610. The portico preceding the facade houses two sphinxes in red granite, coming from a pre-existing pagan temple. In the interior are a pergamum, with interesting parts from the original of the 12th century and a 14th-century Crucifix of Giotto's school, while the crypt houses a noteworthy Roman sarcophagus.
- Castle, built by the dukes of Sessa in the 15th century, originating from a 4th-century BC fortress. In the Bourbon era it was used as prison.

Other sights include:

- Loggione, built over Roman baths in Gothic style.
- San Peter in Aquariis: 14th century church, built over a Palaeo-Christian edifice (in turn constructed over a Roman bath, whence the epithet in Aquariis, "on the water"). Recent restoration work has revealed precious Byzantine frescoes depicting St. Agatha, St Martha, and St Mark and John the Evangelist. The belfry is a rare example of Byzantine architecture in southern Italy.
- St Benedict, the most ancient church within the walls, built in the 9th century over a temple dedicated to Ceres. It has 12 granite and marble columns with antique capitals, and once housed precious Benedictine documents which went lost after a fire.
- San Paride ad Fontem: Paleo-Christian church located on the southeast site below the town. It was built over a Roman cisterna, whence the name (fons, fontis being Latin for a fountain or water source). Built originally in the 4th century, the current construction is from the 11th-12th centuries (extensively restored in 1988).
- Franciscan convent of St Anthony of Padua was built in 1427, according to tradition, by the will of Bernardino da Siena, who also lived here for some years.

== Transportation ==
Teano is 7 kilometres (4 mi) from the gate of Capua of A1 Milan-Naples highway. It can be also reached by road through SS.7 Via Appia and SS.6 Via Casilina. The city is also served by a railway station.
