= Sidicini =

Italic peoples of ancient Italy

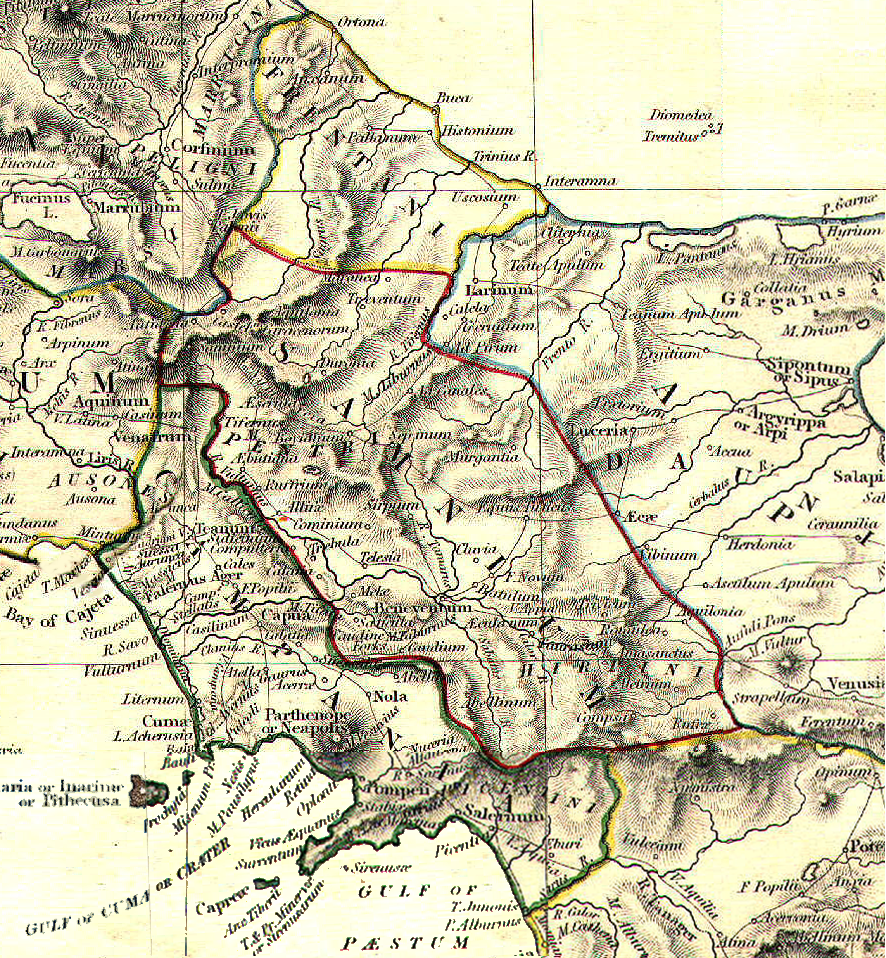
Map of ancient Samnium

The Sidicini (Ancient Greek Σιδικῖνοι) were one of the Italic peoples of ancient Italy. Their territory extended northward from their capital, Teanum Sidicinum (modern day Teano), along the valley of the Liri river up to Fregellae, covering around 3,000 square kilometres (1,200 square miles) in total. They were neighbors of the Samnites and Campanians, and allies of the Ausones and Aurunci. Their language was Oscan.

== Origins ==
According to Strabo, the Sidicini geography was taken from the Opici.

== History ==
=== First Samnite War ===
The Sidicini were mentioned for the first time in 343 BC, when the Samnites declared war on them. The Samnites sought to take Teano because of its position as a regional crossroad. The Sidicini then sought the help of the Campanians. The Campanians sent an army to assist the Sidicini but were beaten in battle by the Samnites, the Samnites then seized the Tifata hills overlooking Capua (the main Campani city) and, having left a strong force to hold them, marched into the plain between the hills and Capua. There they defeated the Campanians in a second battle and drove them within their walls. At this point the Campanians decided to surrender themselves unconditionally into the power of Rome, following which the Romans felt compelled to intervene to protect their new subjects against further Samnite attacks.

Modern historians are in some dispute whether this surrender really took place or was invented to absolve Rome of treaty breaking, but generally agree that Rome formed some kind of alliance with Capua. The Romans broke their treaty of friendship with the Samnites to help the Campani. The First Samnite War ended in 341 with a negotiated peace and renewal of the former treaty between them and Rome. Rome retained her Campanian alliance, but accepted that the Sidicini belonged to the Samnite sphere.

According to Livy, once peace with Rome had been concluded, the Samnites attacked the Sidicini with the same forces they had deployed against Rome. Facing defeat, the Sidicini tried to surrender themselves to Rome, but their surrender was rejected by the senate as coming far too late. The Sidicini then turned to the Latins who had already taken up arms on their own account. The Campanians joined the war as well, and led by the Latins a large army of these allied peoples invaded Samnium.

=== Sidicini-Aurunci War ===
In 337 BC the Sidicini declared war on the Aurunci, and defeated them and forced them out of their capital city of Aurunca, after which the Aurunci made Suessa their capital. In 336 BC the Ausoni joined the Sidicini's side of the war. However the Romans came to the defence of the Aurunci, defeating Sidicini and Ausoni. The capital of the Ausoni, Cales, was occupied, and in 332 BC the Sidicini territory itself was occupied by both consular armies of Rome, but Teano, the capital, resisted the Romans.

The Sidicini do not appear in that war or ever again in history, but Teanum goes on as Teanum Sidicinum and its territory as Sidicinus Ager. If the Romans had fought a great battle and had obliterated the Sidicini, there would be some mention of it or some evidence of a discontinuity at Teano. Instead, the city prospered. Smith accords with the general conclusion that between 335 and 326, most likely in 334, the Sidicini consented to lay down their arms and become part of the greater Roman municipality. Livy's omission remains unexplained.
