= Clavus =

Clavus may refer to:

- Claudius Clavus (born 1388), 15th-century Danish cartographer
- Clavus (gastropod), a genus of snails in the family Drilliidae
- The Roman clavus, a reddish-purple stripe on garments that distinguished members of the senatorial and equestrian orders; see laticlave and angusticlavia
- A shooting pain in the forehead, associated with hysteria, also called clavus hystericus
- Corn (medicine), type of callus formed on the toes
- The plant disease ergot
- The pseudo-tail of the Molidae (sunfish)
- In Hemiptera, a usually narrow strip of the hemelytron adjacent to the scutellum

== See also ==
- Clav (disambiguation)
