= Tunic =

Simple T-shaped or sleeveless garment, usually unfitted, of archaic origin

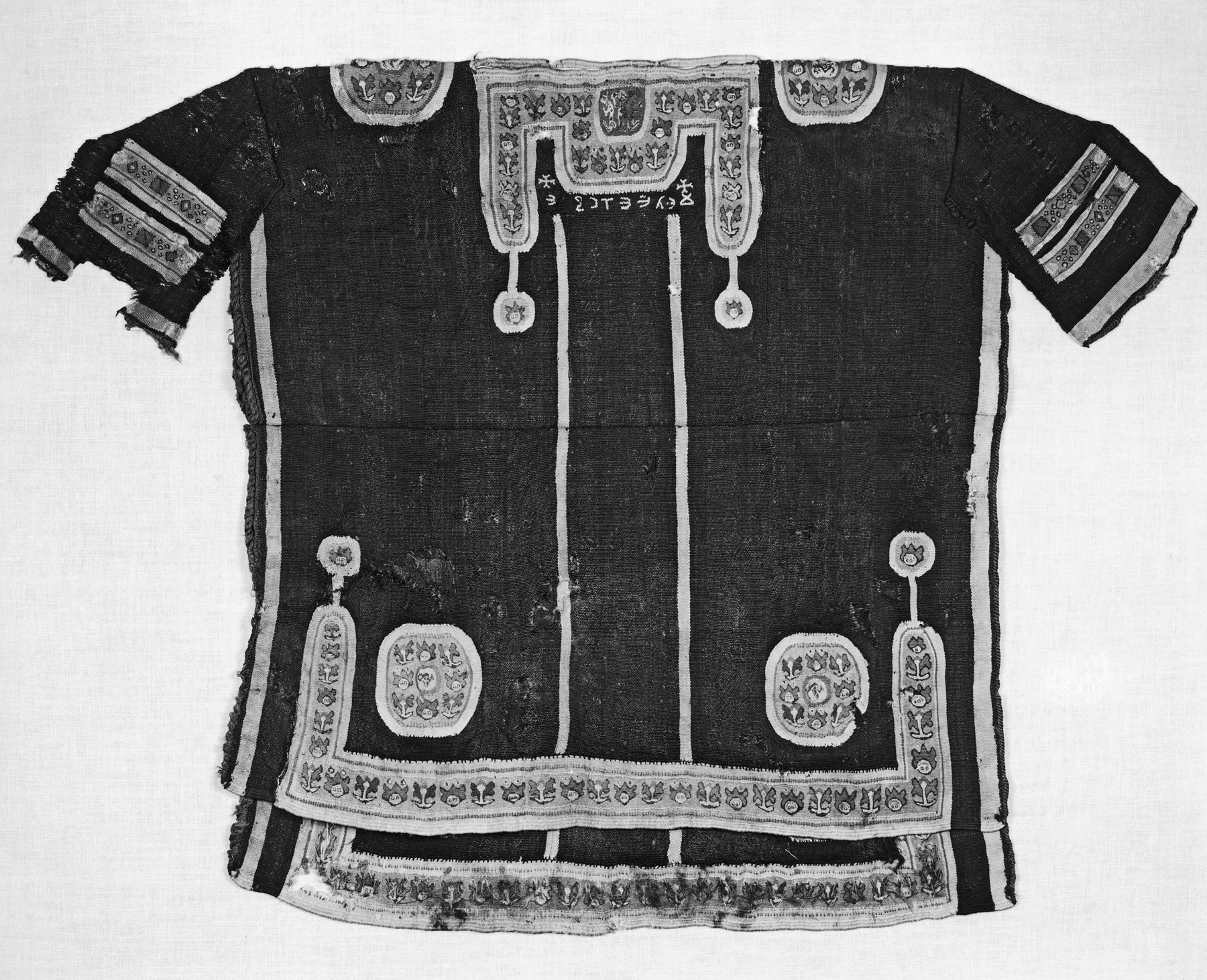
- Egyptian wool tunic, small enough for a child (6th century) (Walters Art Museum)
- Type: clothing reaching from the shoulders to a length somewhere between the hips and the ankles
- Material: fabric

A tunic is a garment for the torso, usually simple in style, reaching from the shoulders to a length somewhere between the hips and the ankles. It might have arm-sleeves, either short or full-length. Most forms have no fastenings. The name derives from the Latin tunica, the basic garment worn by both men and women in ancient Rome, and medieval Egypt, which in turn was based on earlier Greek garments that covered wearers' waists.

The term is likely borrowed from a Semitic word *kittan with metathesis. The word khiton (Ancient Greek: χῐτών) is of the same origin.

== Ancient era ==
=== Roman tunic ===
The Roman tunica was adopted by Roman citizens in the 3rd century BC. It was often worn by Roman citizens and by non-citizens alike. However, citizens might wear it under the toga, especially at formal occasions.

The length of the garment, the presence or lack of stripes, as well as their width and ornamentation, would indicate the wearer's status in Roman society. Roman senators, for example, used the laticlavus, with broad purple stripes, and members of the equestrian class wore the Angusticlavia, with narrower stripes. Soldiers, slaves and manual workers generally had tunics to a little above the knee; those in more sedentary occupations to about the ankle (unless they were expecting to ride a horse, when a shorter one would be worn).

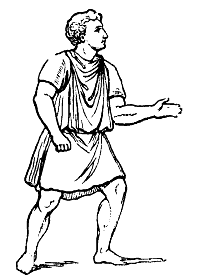
Roman worker dressed in a tunic

The tunic or chiton was worn as a shirt or gown by all genders among the ancient Romans. The body garment was loose-fitting for males, usually beginning at the neck and ending above the knee. A woman's garment could be either close fitting or loose, beginning at the neck and extending over a skirt or skirts.

=== Greek tunic ===
Tunics were also worn in ancient Greece, whence the Roman version was adopted. Later Greek and Roman tunics were an evolution from the very similar chiton, chitoniskos, and exomis, each of which can be considered versions of the garment. In ancient Greece, a person's tunic was decorated at the hemline to represent the polis (city-state) in which he lived. Tunics might be dyed with bright colours like red, purple, or green.

There was also the sisúra (σισύρα), which according to Pollux was a tunic with sleeves of skins. According to the Suda, it was a type of inexpensive cloak, like a one-shoulder tunic. The Dictionary of Greek and Roman Antiquities mentions that it seems to have been more of a cloak than a tunic, and was worn for warmth or used to sleep in. According to the same source, late authors may use the term to mean a piece of cloth.

=== Celtic tunic ===
Tunics worn by the Celts were documented by the Greek historian Diodorus Siculus:

[T]he way they dress is astonishing: they wear brightly coloured and embroidered shirts, with trousers called braccae and cloaks fastened at the shoulder with a brooch, heavy in winter, light in summer. These cloaks are striped or checkered in design, with the separate checks close together and in various colours.

=== Germanic tunic ===
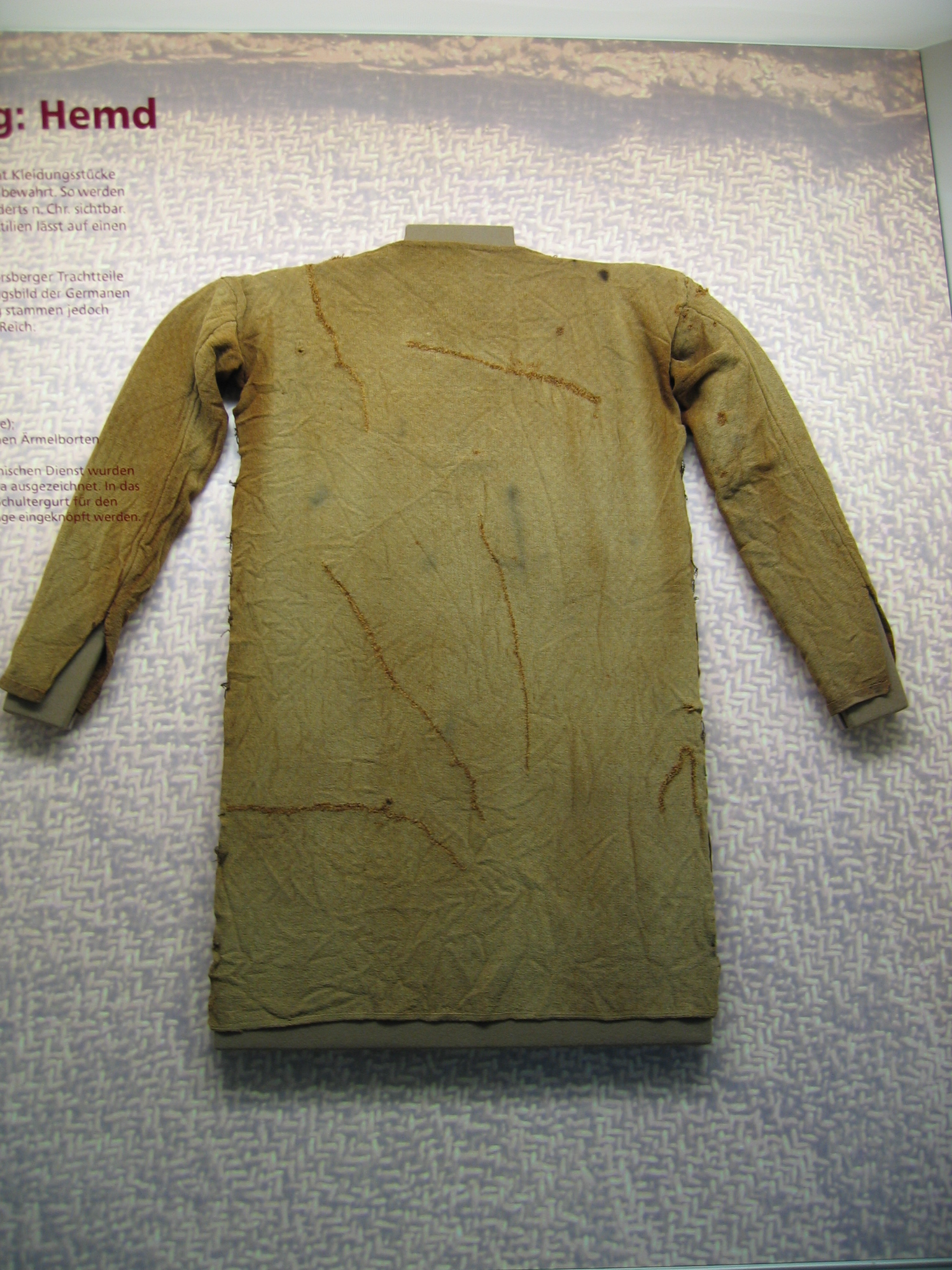
Germanic tunic of the 4th century AD found in the Thorsberg moor

The various Celtic and Germanic peoples living in the colder Middle and Northern Europe wore long-sleeved tunics from as long back as pictorial evidence goes. Such tunics are often found depicted on the various Roman monuments depicting victories over these peoples and show the tunic as a simple pull-over construction reaching to the mid-thighs or the knees. Similar tunics were eventually taken up by the Romans and continued to be used into the Byzantine period.

After the fall of the Western Roman Empire, the long-sleeved Celto-Germanic tunic continued to be worn. The construction was more elaborate than the earlier Graeco-Roman garment, with a tight-fitting neck with a split down the front for pulling it over the head, and gusset under the arms and inserted around the lower half to give a flaring skirt. Being used by both Vikings and Normans, the garment continued as a general male garment into the Middle Ages, still being used in Norway as late as the 17th century.

=== Indian tunic ===
Indus Valley Civilization figurines depict both women and men wearing a tunic-like garment. A terracotta model called Lady of the Spiked Throne depicts two standing turban-wearing men wearing what appears to be a conical gown marked by a dense series of thin vertical incisions that might suggest stiffened cloth. A similar gold disc in the al-Sabah Collection from the Kuwait National Museum appears to be from the Indus Valley civilization and depicts similar conical tunic-wearing men holding two bulls by their tails under a pipal tree shown in an Indus-like mirror symmetry. A mother goddess figurine from the National Museum, New Delhi, shows a female wearing a short tight tunic.

Worn in the Indian subcontinent, including India, Pakistan and Bangladesh, the tunic is usually referred to as kurta. An Asian tunic is typically adorned with delicate embroidery, bead-work or intricate threadwork as well. Embroidery or thread work on such tunics usually combines threads of many different colors.

=== Vietnamese tunic ===
Vietnamese tunics are called áo dài (lit. 'long shirt'), is a traditional garment worn by both men and women, it was derived from áo ngũ thân (lit. 'five-piece shirt'). It is similar to the kurta of the Indian subcontinent countries because they are both forms of clothing consisting of a long split tunic worn over trousers.

In the 18th century, in an attempt to separate his domain from Tonkin, ruled by his rivals the Trịnh clan, and build an independent state, Nguyễn Phúc Khoát (reigned 1738–1765) forced his subjects to change their style of dress. The áo giao lĩnh (lit. 'cross-collar robe') replaced by a robe with fasteners, which was buttoned in the front, and had an upright collar, the skirt was also replaced by trousers. This new style of dress became the prototype of the áo dài; it was a form of áo ngũ thân which was invented by Nguyễn Phúc Khoát; the áo ngũ thân also had five flaps instead of four (the fifth flap was small and was found under the front garment) and five buttons. Under the rule of Minh Mạng, two new forms of áo dài were created from the áo ngũ thân regulated by Nguyễn Phúc Khoát: the áo tứ thân (lit. 'four-piece shirt') and the Huế-style áo dài which was created with five flaps. The Huế-style áo dài represented royal court culture of the Huế and later developed influenced the modern áo dài.

== Medieval tunic ==
The tunic continued to be the basic garment of the Byzantine Romans of both sexes throughout the medieval period. The upper classes wore other garments atop the basic tunic, such as the dalmatica, a heavier and shorter type of tunic, again, worn by both sexes, or the scaramangion, a riding-coat of Persian origin. Except for the military or riding dress, men and women of higher status wore tunics that came down to the ankles, or nearly so. Tunics were often dyed or richly embroidered, although the plainer ones could be used when layering different types.

Beyond the reduced empire, the tunic continued to be worn with varying sleeve and hem lengths throughout Europe during the Middle Ages. Often reaching the knees or ankles, it was usually worn over underclothes consisting of a shirt (usually hip-length or longer) and drawers (usually knee- or ankle-length pants related to braccae). It may be accompanied by hose. Wool and linen were common fabrics used, though the wealthy sometimes wore fancy silk tunics or a lesser fabric with silk trim. In English the garment was referred to as a sark, and this word survives in some northern UK dialects to mean a shirt or chemise.

Tunics worn during the Early Middle Ages often featured decorative embroidery or tablet-woven braids along the neck, hem and wrists. This was the case, for instance, with tunics worn by both rich and poor Anglo-Saxons before the Norman Conquest.

== Modern tunic ==
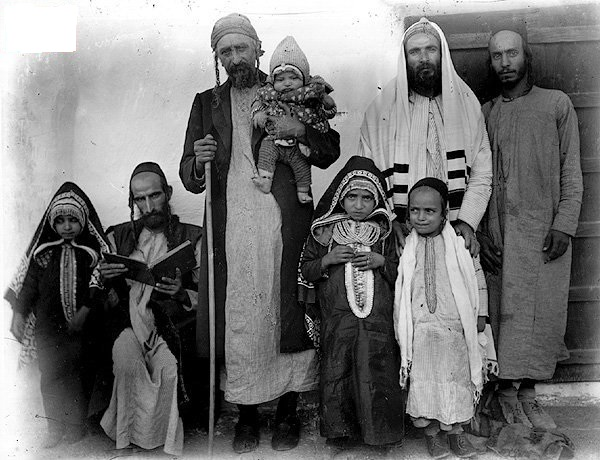
20th-century Yemenite Jews dressed in tunics

Around 1830, small boys began to be dressed in sashed or belted tunics over trousers, a fashion which replaced the earlier skeleton suit.

During the Crimean War in the 1850s, it was realized that the waist length jackets which had been worn by British soldiers since Napoleonic times were unsuitable for fighting in winter conditions. A new longer jacket was introduced which reached down to the mid thigh and this was named the 'tunic' after the 'tunica' of the intrepid ancient Roman soldier. This type of jacket soon became standard for most armies.

In Western culture, its use continues primarily in a religious and uniform context. It is the primary garment worn by the clergy and members of religious orders. The religious tunic reaches to the feet and was the source of the clerical cassock, as well as, in its liturgical form, the alb, after the long tunic worn by Roman citizens. 'Tunic' is also the name often given to the high-collar uniform coat worn by military and police personnel. Light feminine garments, especially for sports or exercise, usually only coming down to mid-thigh, are also called tunics.

== See also ==
- 1830s children's fashion
- 1840s children's fashion
- 1850s children's fashion
- Anglo-Saxon dress
- Clothing in ancient Rome
- Clothing in the ancient world
- Coat
- Dashiki
- Dress
- Early medieval European dress
- Gymslip
- Kaftan
- Kurta
- Robe
- Seamless robe of Jesus
- Shalwar kameez
- T-shirt
- Thawb
