= Enkyklon =

Kind of himation (wraparound)

Enkyklon (Greek: ἔγκυκλον, "circular [garment]") was a kind of himation. Enkyklon was most likely used as a wraparound outer garment, a mantle or 'encircling'. It was worn by ancient Greek women from the archaic through the Hellenistic periods. The garment has been recorded at the ancient Greek sanctuary of Artemis, Brauron. Contemporary wraps such as ampechonon, epiblēma are also included in the inventories at Delos (Leto, Hera), Brauron, Tanagra and Samos (Hera).

== See also ==
- Chiton (garment)
- Toga
