= Toga =

Ancient Roman formal dress

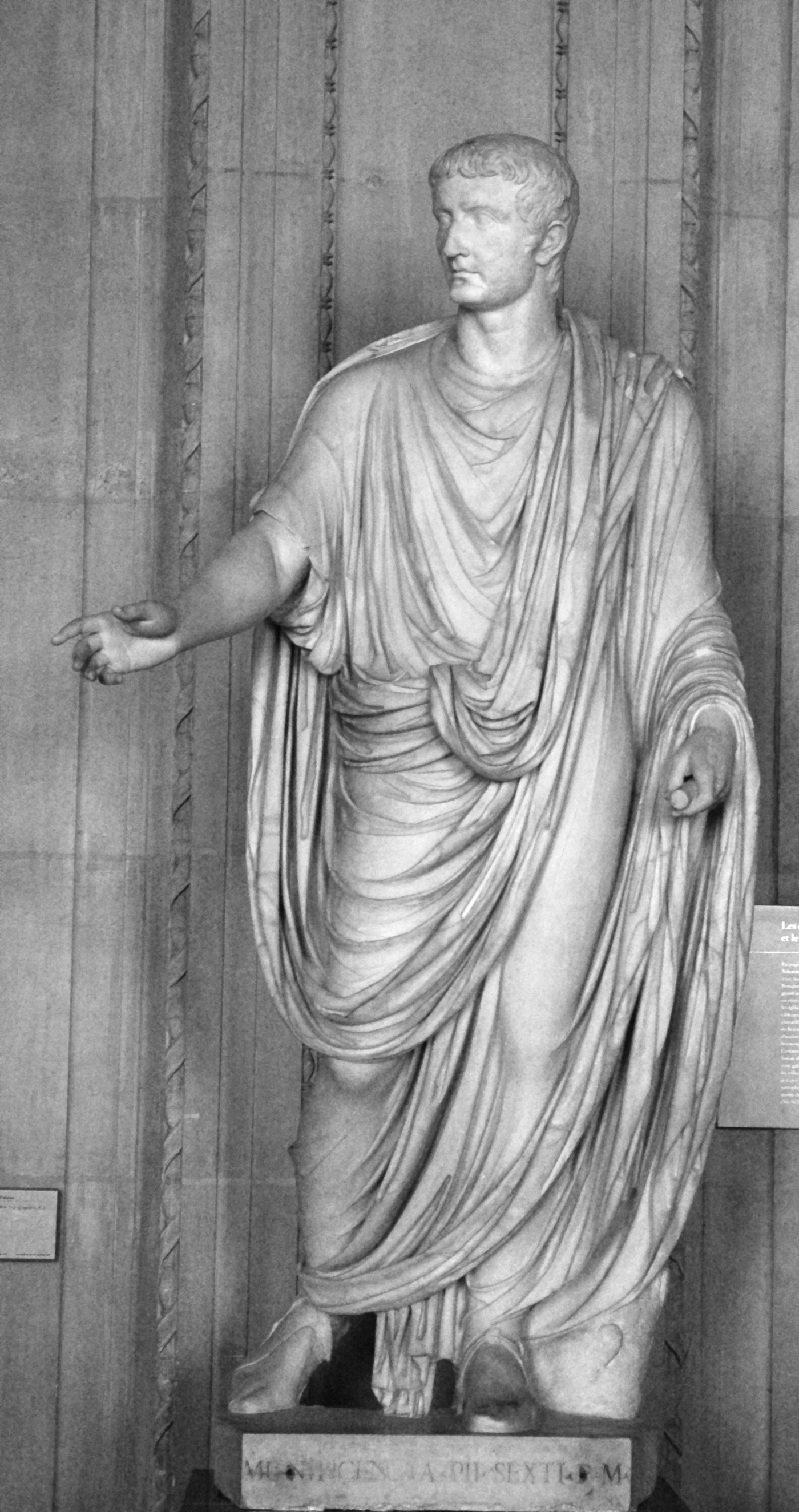
Statue of the Emperor Tiberius showing a draped toga of the 1st century AD

The toga (/ˈtoʊɡə/, Classical Latin: [ˈt̪ɔ.ɡa]), a distinctive garment of Ancient Rome, was a roughly semicircular cloth, between 12 and 20 feet (3.7 and 6.1 m) in length, draped over the shoulders and around the body. It was usually woven from white wool, and was worn over a tunic. In Roman historical tradition, it is said to have been the favored dress of Romulus, Rome's founder; it was also thought to have originally been worn by both sexes, and by the citizen-military. As Roman women gradually adopted the stola, the toga was recognized as formal wear for male Roman citizens. Women found guilty of adultery and women engaged in prostitution might have provided the main exceptions to this rule.

The type of toga worn reflected a citizen's rank in the civil hierarchy. Various laws and customs restricted its use to citizens, who were required to wear it for public festivals and civic duties.

From its probable beginnings as a simple, practical work-garment, the toga became more voluminous, complex, and costly, increasingly unsuited to anything but formal and ceremonial use. It was and is considered ancient Rome's "national costume"; it had great symbolic value. However, even among Romans, it was hard to put on, uncomfortable and challenging to wear correctly, and never truly popular. When circumstances allowed, those otherwise entitled or obliged to wear it opted for more comfortable, casual garments. It gradually fell out of use, firstly among citizens of the lower class, then those of the middle class. Eventually, it was worn only by the highest classes for ceremonial occasions.

== Varieties ==
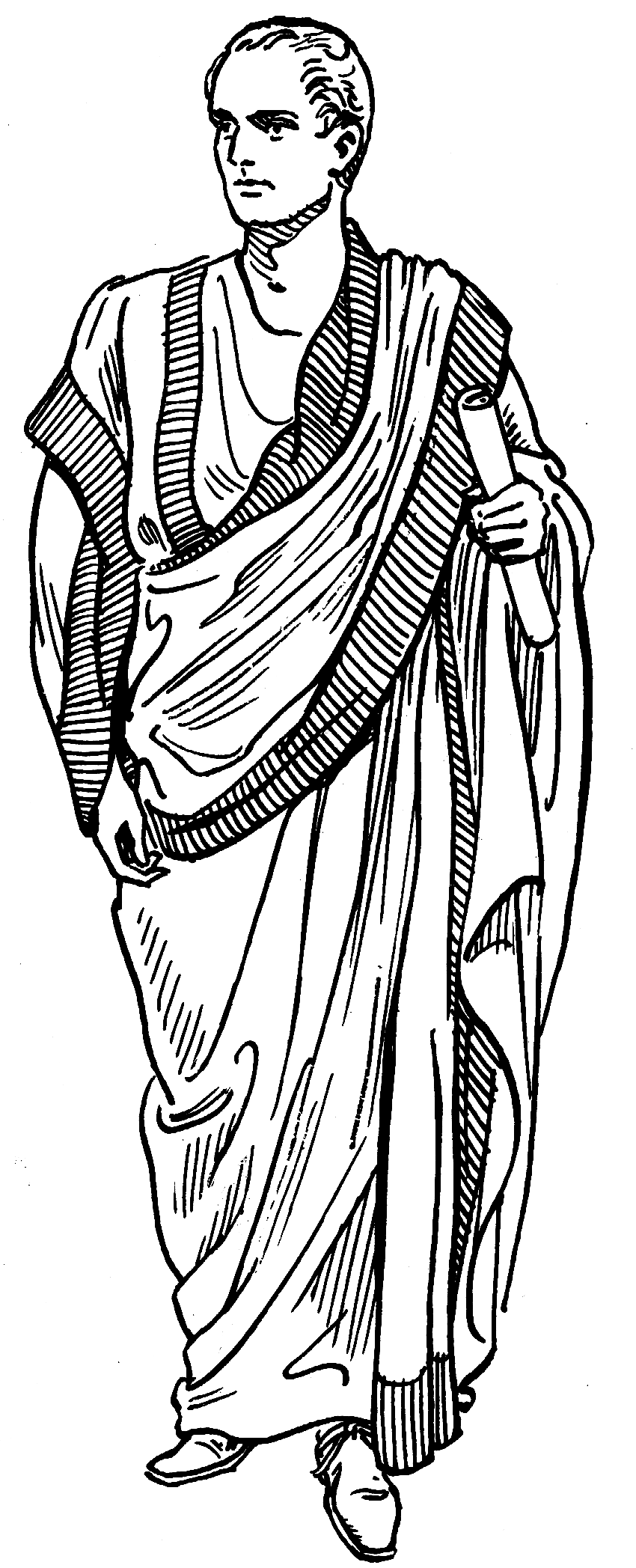
A toga praetexta

The toga was an approximately semi-circular woollen cloth, usually white, worn draped over the left shoulder and around the body: the word "toga" probably derives from tegere, to cover. It was considered formal wear and was generally reserved for citizens. The Romans considered it unique to themselves, thus their poetic description by Virgil and Martial as the gens togata ('toga-wearing race'). There were many kinds of toga, each reserved by custom to a particular usage or social class.

- Toga virilis ("toga of manhood") also known as toga alba or toga pura: A plain white toga, worn on formal occasions by adult male commoners, and by senators not having a curule magistracy. It represented adult male citizenship and its attendant rights, freedoms and responsibilities; traditionally given at a father's discretion to his son during the feast of Liberalia, to mark the onset of puberty and legal "coming of age", at around 14-17 years of age.
- Toga praetexta: a white toga with a broad purple stripe on its border, worn over a tunic with two broad, vertical purple stripes. It was formal costume for:
  - Curule magistrates in their official functions, and traditionally, the Kings of Rome.
  - Freeborn boys, and some freeborn girls, before they came of age. It marked their protection by law from sexual predation and immoral or immodest influence. A praetexta was thought effective against malignant magic, as were a boy's bulla and a girl's lunula.
  - Some priesthoods, including the Pontifices, Tresviri Epulones, the augurs, and the Arval brothers.
- Toga candida: "Bright toga"; a toga rubbed with chalk to a dazzling white, worn by candidates (from Latin candida, "pure white") for public office. Thus Persius speaks of a cretata ambitio, "chalked ambition". Toga candida is the etymological source of the word candidate.
- Toga pulla: a "dark toga" was supposed to be worn by mourners at elite funerals. A toga praetexta was also acceptable as mourning wear, if turned inside out to conceal its stripe; so was a plain toga pura. Wearing a toga pulla at the feast that ended mourning was irreligious, ignorant, or plain bad manners. Cicero makes a distinction between the toga pulla and an ordinary toga deliberately "dirtied" by its wearer as a legitimate mark of protest or supplication.
- Toga picta ("painted toga"): Dyed solid purple, decorated with imagery in gold thread, and worn over a similarly decorated tunica palmata. Worn by early Roman kings, later used by generals in their triumphs. During the Empire, it was worn by consuls and emperors. Over time, it became increasingly elaborate, and was combined with elements of the consular trabea.
- Trabea, associated with citizens of equestrian rank; thus their description as trabeati in some contemporary Roman literature. It may have been a shorter form of toga, or a cloak, wrap or sash worn over a toga. It was white with some form of decoration. In the later Imperial era, trabea refers to elaborate forms of consular dress. Some later Roman and post-Roman sources describe it as solid purple or red, either identifying or confusing it with the dress worn by the ancient Roman kings (also used to clothe images of the gods) or reflecting changes in the trabea itself. More certainly, equites wore an angusticlavia, a tunic with narrow, vertical purple stripes, at least one of which would have been visible when worn with a toga or trabea, whatever its form.
- Laena, a long, heavy cloak worn by Flamen priesthoods, fastened at the shoulder with a brooch. A lost work by Suetonius describes it as a toga made "duplex" (doubled by folding over upon itself).

== As "national dress" ==
The toga's most distinguishing feature was its semi-circular shape, which sets it apart from other cloaks of antiquity like the Greek himation or pallium. To Rothe, the rounded form suggests an origin in the very similar, semi-circular Etruscan tebenna. Norma Goldman believes that the earliest forms of all these garments would have been simple, rectangular lengths of cloth that served as both body-wrap and blanket for peasants, shepherds and itinerant herdsmen. Roman historians believed that Rome's legendary founder and first king, the erstwhile shepherd Romulus, had worn a toga as his clothing of choice; the purple-bordered toga praetexta was supposedly used by Etruscan magistrates, and introduced to Rome by her third king, Tullus Hostilius.

In the wider context of classical Greco-Roman fashion, the Greek enkyklon ("circular [garment]") was perhaps similar in shape to the Roman toga, but never acquired the same significance as a distinctive mark of citizenship. The 2nd-century diviner Artemidorus Daldianus in his Oneirocritica derived the toga's form and name from the Greek tebennos, supposedly an Arcadian garment invented by and named after Temenus. Emilio Peruzzi claims that the toga was brought to Italy from Mycenaean Greece, its name based on Mycenaean Greek te-pa, referring to a heavy woollen garment or fabric.

=== In civil life ===
Roman society was strongly hierarchical, stratified and competitive. Landowning aristocrats occupied most seats in the Roman Senate and held the most senior magistracies. Magistrates were elected by their peers and "the people"; in Roman constitutional theory, they ruled by consent. In practice, they were a mutually competitive oligarchy, reserving the greatest power, wealth and prestige for their class. The commoners who made up the vast majority of the Roman electorate had limited influence on politics, unless barracking or voting en masse, or through representation by their tribunes. The Equites (sometimes loosely translated as "knights") occupied a broadly mobile, mid-position between the lower senatorial and upper commoner class. Despite often extreme disparities of wealth and rank between the citizen classes, the toga identified them as a singular and exclusive civic body.

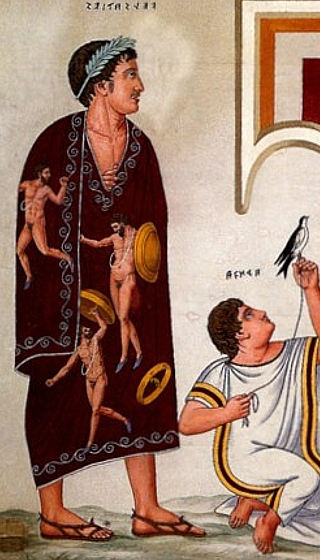
Illustration of an Etruscan wall painting from the François Tomb at Vulci. Some scholars believe this shows a toga picta, largely based on its colour and decorative detail; others suggest that the straight edges make it a Greek-style cloak, and not a toga.

Togas were relatively uniform in pattern and style but varied significantly in the quality and quantity of their fabric, and the marks of higher rank or office. The highest-status toga, the solidly purple, gold-embroidered toga picta could be worn only at particular ceremonies by the highest-ranking magistrates. Tyrian purple was supposedly reserved for the toga picta, the border of the toga praetexta, and elements of the priestly dress worn by the inviolate Vestal Virgins. It was colour-fast, extremely expensive and the "most talked-about colour in Greco-Roman antiquity". Romans categorised it as a blood-red hue, which sanctified its wearer. The purple-bordered praetexta worn by freeborn youths acknowledged their vulnerability and sanctity in law. Once a boy came of age (usually at puberty) he adopted the plain white toga virilis; this meant that he was free to set up his own household, marry, and vote. Young girls who wore the praetexta on formal occasions put it aside at menarche or marriage, and adopted the stola. Even the whiteness of the toga virilis was subject to class distinction. Senatorial versions were expensively laundered to an exceptional, snowy white; those of lower ranking citizens were a duller shade, more cheaply laundered.

Citizenship carried specific privileges, rights and responsibilities. The formula togatorum ("list of toga-wearers") listed the various military obligations that Rome's Italian allies were required to supply to Rome in times of war. Togati, "those who wear the toga", is not precisely equivalent to "Roman citizens", and may mean more broadly "Romanized". In Roman territories, the toga was explicitly forbidden to non-citizens; to foreigners, freedmen, and slaves; to Roman exiles; and to men of "infamous" career or shameful reputation; an individual's status should be discernable at a glance. A freedman or foreigner might pose as a togate citizen, or a common citizen as an equestrian; such pretenders were sometimes ferreted out in the census. Formal seating arrangements in public theatres and circuses reflected the dominance of Rome's togate elect. Senators sat at the very front, equites behind them, common citizens behind equites; and so on, through the non-togate mass of freedmen, foreigners, and slaves. Imposters were sometimes detected and evicted from the equestrian seats.

Various anecdotes reflect the toga's symbolic value. In Livy's history of Rome, the patrician hero Lucius Quinctius Cincinnatus, retired from public life and clad (presumably) in tunic or loincloth, is ploughing his field when emissaries of the Senate arrive, and ask him to put on his toga. His wife fetches it and he puts it on. Then he is told that he has been appointed dictator. He promptly heads for Rome. Donning the toga transforms Cincinnatus from rustic, sweaty ploughman – though a gentleman nevertheless, of impeccable stock and reputation – into Rome's leading politician, eager to serve his country; a top-quality Roman. Rome's abundant public and private statuary reinforced the notion that all Rome's great men wore togas, and must always have done so.

=== Work and leisure ===
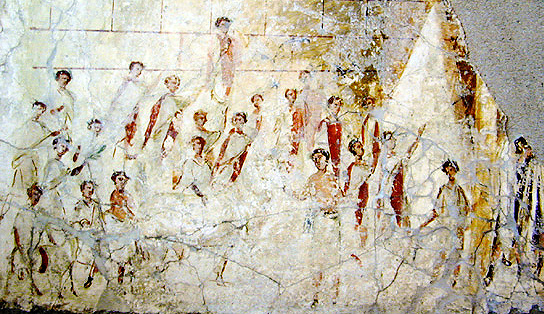
A fresco from a building near Pompeii, a rare depiction of Roman men in togae praetextae with dark red borders. It dates from the early Imperial Era and probably shows an event during Compitalia, a popular street festival.

Traditionalists idealised Rome's urban and rustic citizenry as descendants of a hardy, virtuous, toga-clad peasantry, but the toga's bulk and complex drapery made it entirely impractical for manual work or physically active leisure. The toga was heavy, "unwieldy, excessively hot, easily stained, and hard to launder". It was best suited to stately processions, public debate and oratory, sitting in the theatre or circus, and displaying oneself before one's peers and inferiors while "ostentatiously doing nothing".

Every male Roman citizen was entitled to wear some kind of toga – Martial refers to a lesser citizen's "small toga" and a poor man's "little toga" (both togula), but the poorest probably had to make do with a shabby, patched-up toga, if he bothered at all. Conversely, the costly, full-length toga seems to have been a rather awkward mark of distinction when worn by "the wrong sort". The poet Horace writes "of a rich ex-slave 'parading from end to end of the Sacred Way in a toga three yards long' to show off his new status and wealth."

In the early 2nd century AD, the satirist Juvenal claimed that "in a great part of Italy, no-one wears the toga, except in death"; in Martial's rural idyll there is "never a lawsuit, the toga is scarce, the mind at ease". Most citizens who owned a toga would have cherished it as a costly material object, and worn it when they must for special occasions. Family, friendships and alliances, and the gainful pursuit of wealth through business and trade would have been their major preoccupations, not the otium (cultured leisure) claimed as a right by the elite. Rank, reputation and Romanitas were paramount, even in death, so almost invariably, a male citizen's memorial image showed him clad in his toga. He wore it at his funeral, and it probably served as his shroud.

Despite the overwhelming quantity of Roman togate portraits at every social level, and in every imaginable circumstance, at most times Rome's thoroughfares would have been crowded with citizens and non-citizens in a variety of colourful garments, with few togas in evidence. Only a higher-class Roman, a magistrate, would have had lictors to clear his way, and even then, wearing a toga was a challenge. The toga's apparent natural simplicity and "elegant, flowing lines" were the result of diligent practice and cultivation; to avoid an embarrassing disarrangement of its folds, its wearer had to walk with measured, stately gait, yet with virile purpose and energy. If he moved too slowly, he might seem aimless, "sluggish of mind" – or, worst of all, "womanly". Vout (1996) suggests that the toga's most challenging qualities as garment fitted the Romans' view of themselves and their civilization. Like the empire itself, the peace that the toga came to represent had been earned through the extraordinary and unremitting collective efforts of its citizens, who could therefore claim "the time and dignity to dress in such a way".

== Patronage and salutationes ==
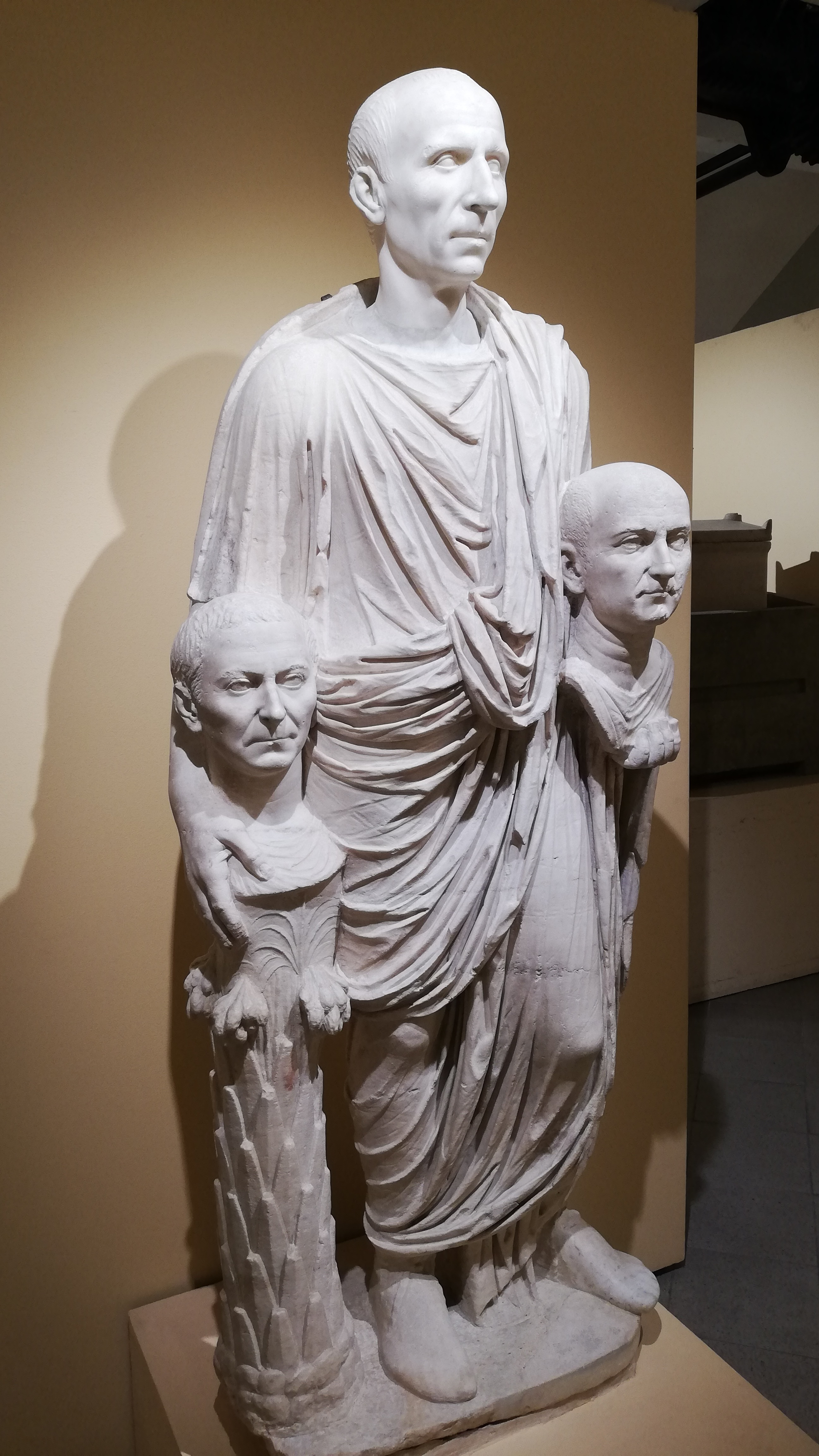
The so-called "Togatus Barberini" depicting a Roman senator with portrait busts of ancestors, one of which is supported by a herma: marble, late 1st century BC; head (not belonging): middle 1st century BC.

Patronage was a cornerstone of Roman politics, business and social relationships. A good patron offered advancement, security, honour, wealth, government contracts and other business opportunities to his client, who might be further down in the social or economic scale, or more rarely, his equal or superior. A good client canvassed political support for his patron, or his patron's nominee; he advanced his patron's interests using his own business, family and personal connections. Freedmen with an aptitude for business could become extremely wealthy; but to negotiate citizenship for themselves, or more likely their sons, they had to find a patron prepared to commend them. Clients seeking patronage had to attend the patron's early-morning formal salutatio ("greeting session"), held in the semi-public, grand reception room (atrium) of his family house (domus). Citizen-clients were expected to wear the toga appropriate to their status, and to wear it correctly and smartly or risk affront to their host.

Martial and his friend Juvenal suffered the system as clients for years, and found the whole business demeaning. A client had to be at his patron's beck and call, to perform whatever "togate works" were required; and the patron might even expect to be addressed as "domine" (lord, or master); a citizen-client of the equestrian class, superior to all lesser mortals by virtue of rank and costume, might thus approach the shameful condition of dependent servitude. For a client whose patron was another's client, the potential for shame was still worse. Even as a satirical analogy, the equation of togate client and slave would have shocked those who cherished the toga as a symbol of personal dignity and auctoritas – a meaning underlined during the Saturnalia festival, when the toga was "very consciously put aside", in a ritualised, strictly limited inversion of the master-slave relationship.

Patrons were few, and most had to compete with their peers to attract the best, most useful clients. Clients were many, and those of least interest to the patron had to scrabble for notice among the "togate horde" (turbae togatae). One in a dirty or patched toga would likely be subject to ridicule; or he might, if sufficiently dogged and persistent, secure a pittance of cash, or perhaps a dinner. When the patron left his house to conduct his business of the day at the law courts, forum or wherever else, escorted (if a magistrate) by his togate lictors, his clients must form his retinue. Each togate client represented a potential vote: to impress his peers and inferiors, and stay ahead in the game, a patron should have as many high-quality clients as possible; or at least, he should seem to. Martial has one patron hire a herd (grex) of fake clients in togas, then pawn his ring to pay for his evening meal.

The emperor Marcus Aurelius, rather than wear the "dress to which his rank entitled him" at his own salutationes, chose to wear a plain white citizen's toga instead. Caligula wore a triumphal toga picta or any other garment he chose, according to whim. Nero caused considerable offence when he received visiting senators while dressed in a tunic embroidered with flowers, topped off with a muslin neckerchief.

== Oratory ==
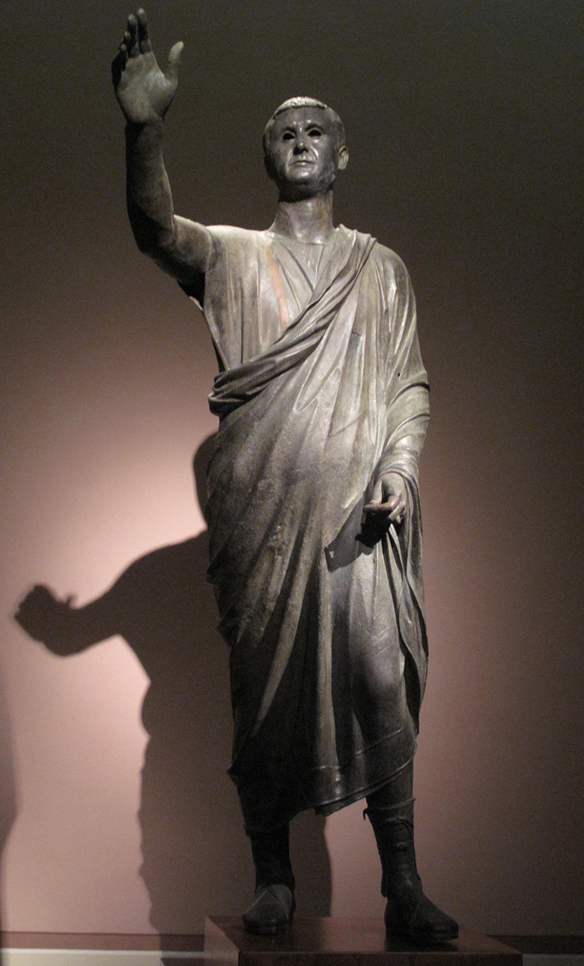
The Orator, c. 100 BC, an Etrusco-Roman bronze sculpture depicting Aule Metele (Latin: Aulus Metellus), an Etruscan man of Roman senatorial rank, engaging in rhetoric. He wears senatorial shoes, and a toga praetexta of "skimpy" (exigua) Republican type. The statue features an inscription in the Etruscan alphabet.

In oratory, the toga came into its own. Quintilian's Institutio Oratoria (circa 95 AD) offers advice on how best to plead cases at Rome's law-courts, before the watching multitude's informed and critical eye. Effective pleading was a calculated artistic performance, but must seem utterly natural. First impressions counted; the lawyer must present himself as a Roman should: "virile and splendid" in his toga, with statuesque posture and "natural good looks". He should be well groomed – but not too well; no primping of the hair, jewellery or any other "feminine" perversions of a Roman man's proper appearance. Quintilian gives precise instructions on the correct use of the toga. Its fabric could be old-style rough wool, or new and smoother if preferred – but definitely not silk. The orator's movements should be dignified, and to the point; he should move only as he must, to address a particular person, a particular section of the audience. He should employ to good effect that subtle "language of the hands" for which Roman oratory was famed; no extravagant gestures, no wiggling of the shoulders, no moving "like a dancer".

To a great extent, the toga itself determined the orator's style of delivery:

we should not cover the shoulder and the whole of the throat, otherwise our dress will be unduly narrowed and will lose the impressive effect produced by breadth at the chest. The left arm should only be raised so far as to form a right angle at the elbow, while the edge of the toga should fall in equal lengths on either side.

If, on the other hand, the "toga falls down at the beginning of our speech, or when we have only proceeded but a little way, the failure to replace it is a sign of indifference, or sloth, or sheer ignorance of the way in which clothes should be worn". By the time he had presented his case, the orator was likely to be hot and sweaty; but even this could be employed to good effect.

== In public morals ==
Roman moralists "placed an ideological premium on the simple and the frugal". Aulus Gellius claimed that the earliest Romans, famously tough, virile and dignified, had worn togas with no undergarment; not even a skimpy tunic. Towards the end of the Republic, the arch-conservative Cato the Younger favoured the shorter, ancient Republican type of toga; it was dark and "scanty" (exigua), and Cato wore it without tunic or shoes; all this would have been recognised as an expression of his moral probity. Die-hard Roman traditionalists deplored an ever-increasing Roman appetite for ostentation, "un-Roman" comfort and luxuries, and sartorial offences such as Celtic trousers, brightly coloured Syrian robes and cloaks. The manly toga itself could signify corruption, if worn too loosely, or worn over a long-sleeved, "effeminate" tunic, or woven too fine and thin, near transparent.

Appian's history of Rome finds its strife-torn Late Republic tottering at the edge of chaos; most seem to dress as they like, not as they ought: "For now the Roman people are much mixed with foreigners, there is equal citizenship for freedmen, and slaves dress like their masters. With the exception of the Senators, free citizens and slaves wear the same costume."

The Augustan Principate brought peace, and declared its intent as the restoration of true Republican order, morality and tradition.

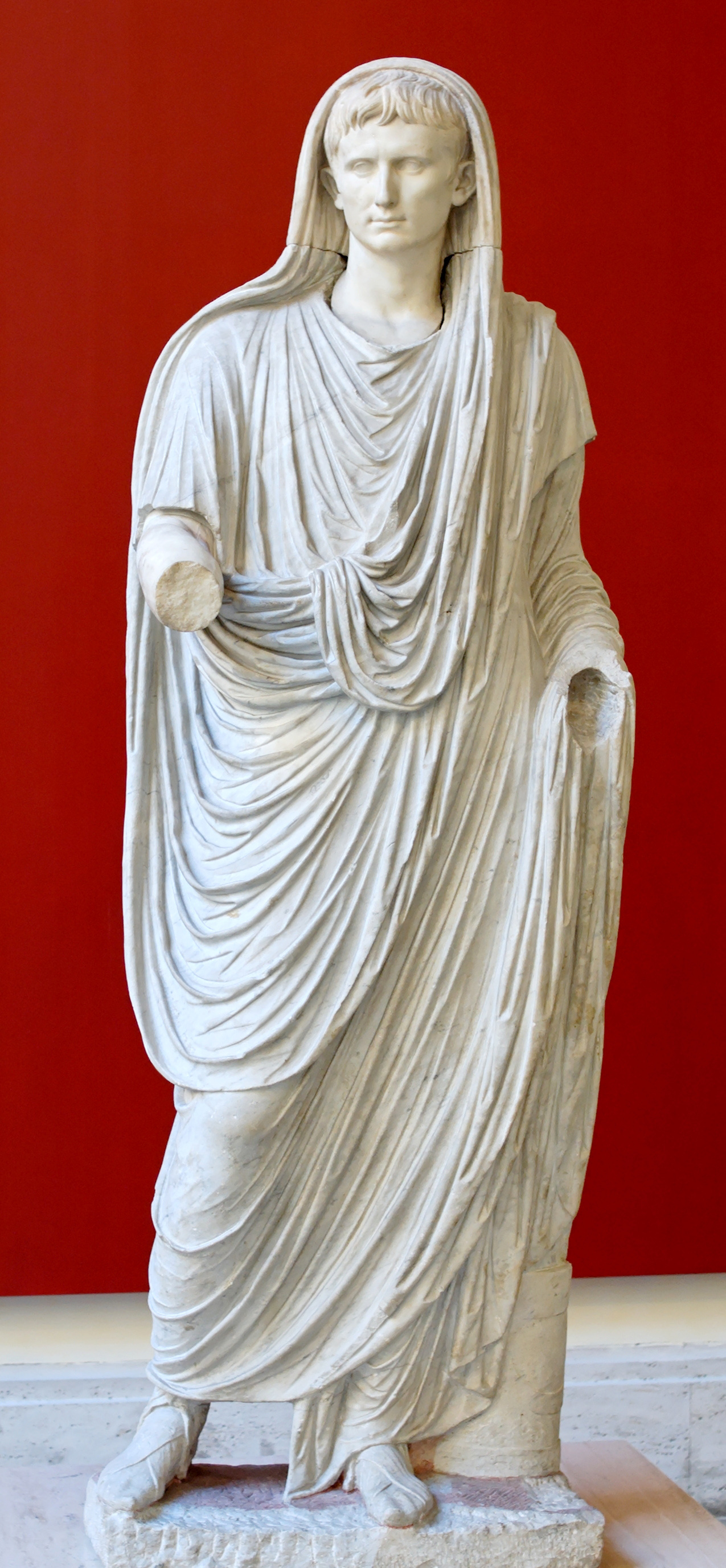
Augustus wearing a toga capite velato ("with covered head"). A knee-length loop of fabric (left) forms the sinus; a smaller loop at waist level forms the umbo, which functions as a pocket (c. 12 BC). (Via Labicana Augustus).

Augustus was determined to bring back "the traditional style" (the toga). He ordered that any theater-goer in dark (or colored or dirty) clothing be sent to the back seats, traditionally reserved for those who had no toga; ordinary or common women, freedmen, low-class foreigners and slaves. He reserved the most honorable seats, front of house, for senators and equites; this was how it had always been, before the chaos of the civil wars; or rather, how it was supposed to have been. Infuriated by the sight of a darkly clad throng of men at a public meeting, he sarcastically quoted Virgil at them: "Romanos, rerum dominos, gentemque togatam" ("Romans, lords of the world and the toga-wearing people"), then ordered that in future, the aediles ban anyone not wearing the toga from the Forum and its environs – Rome's "civic heart".

During the reign of Augustus, the toga rasa was introduced, an ordinary toga for which the rough fibers were teased from the woven nap, then shaved back to a smoother, more comfortable finish. By Pliny's day (circa 70 AD), this was probably standard among the elite. Pliny also describes a glossy, smooth, lightweight but dense fabric woven from poppy-stem fibers and flax, in use from at least the time of the Punic Wars. Although probably appropriate for a "summer toga", it was criticized for its improper luxuriance.

=== Women ===
Some Romans believed that in earlier times, both genders and all classes had worn the toga. Radicke (2002) claims that this belief goes back to a Late Antique scholiast misreading of earlier Roman writings. Women could also be citizens, but by the mid-to-late Republican era, respectable women were stolatae (stola-wearing), expected to embody and display an appropriate set of female virtues: Vout cites pudicitia and fides as examples. Women's adoption of the stola may have paralleled the increasing identification of the toga with citizen men, but this seems to have been a far from straightforward process. An equestrian statue, described by Pliny the Elder as "ancient", showed the early Republican heroine Cloelia on horseback, wearing a toga. The unmarried daughters of respectable, reasonably well-off citizens sometimes wore the toga praetexta until puberty or marriage, when they adopted the stola, which they wore over a full-length, usually long-sleeved tunic.

Higher-class female prostitutes (meretrices) and women divorced for adultery were denied the stola. Meretrices might have been expected or perhaps compelled, at least in public, to wear the "female toga" (toga muliebris). This use of the toga appears unique; all others categorized as "infamous and disreputable" were explicitly forbidden to wear it. In this context, modern sources understand the toga – or perhaps merely the description of particular women as togata – as an instrument of inversion and realignment; a respectable (thus stola-clad) woman should be demure, sexually passive, modest and obedient, morally impeccable. The archetypical meretrix of Roman literature dresses gaudily and provocatively. Edwards (1997) describes her as "antithetical to the Roman male citizen". An adulterous matron betrayed her family and reputation; and if found guilty, and divorced, the law forbade her remarriage to a Roman citizen. In the public gaze, she was aligned with the meretrix. When worn by a woman in this later era, the toga would have been a "blatant display" of her "exclusion from the respectable Roman hierarchy". However, the view that a convicted adulteress (moecha damnata) actually wore a toga in public has been challenged; Radicke believes that the only prostitutes who could be made to wear particular items of clothing were unfree, compelled by their owners or pimps to wear the relatively shorter, "skimpy", less costly toga exigua, which was more revealing, easily opened, and thus convenient to their profession.

== Roman military ==
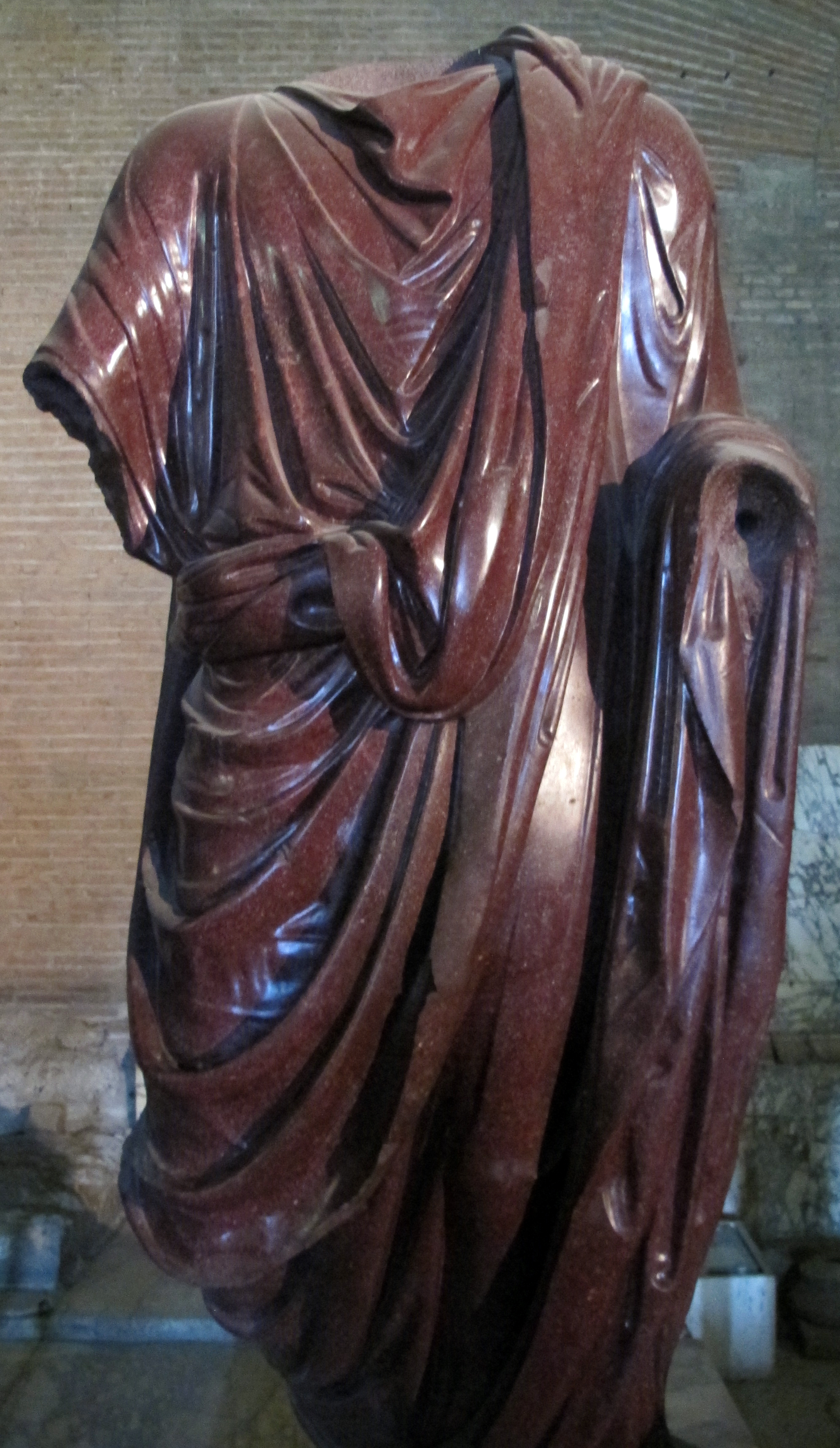
Togate statue of an emperor in porphyry, now in the Curia Julia.

The lower ranks of Rome's military forces were "farmer-soldiers", a militia of citizen smallholders conscripted for the duration of hostilities, expected to provide their own arms and armour. Citizens of higher status served in senior military posts as a foundation for their progress to high civil office (see cursus honorum). The Romans believed that in Rome's earliest days, its military had gone to war in togas, hitching them up and back for action by using what became known as the "Gabine cinch". In 206 BC, Scipio Africanus was sent 1,200 togas and 12,000 tunics for his operations in North Africa. As part of a peace settlement of 205 BC, two formerly rebellious Spanish tribes provided Roman troops with togas and heavy cloaks. In the Macedonian campaign of 169 BC, the army was sent 6,000 togas and 30,000 tunics. From at least the mid-Republic on, the military reserved their togas for formal leisure and religious festivals; the tunic and sagum (heavy rectangular cloak held on the shoulder with a brooch) were used or preferred for active duty.

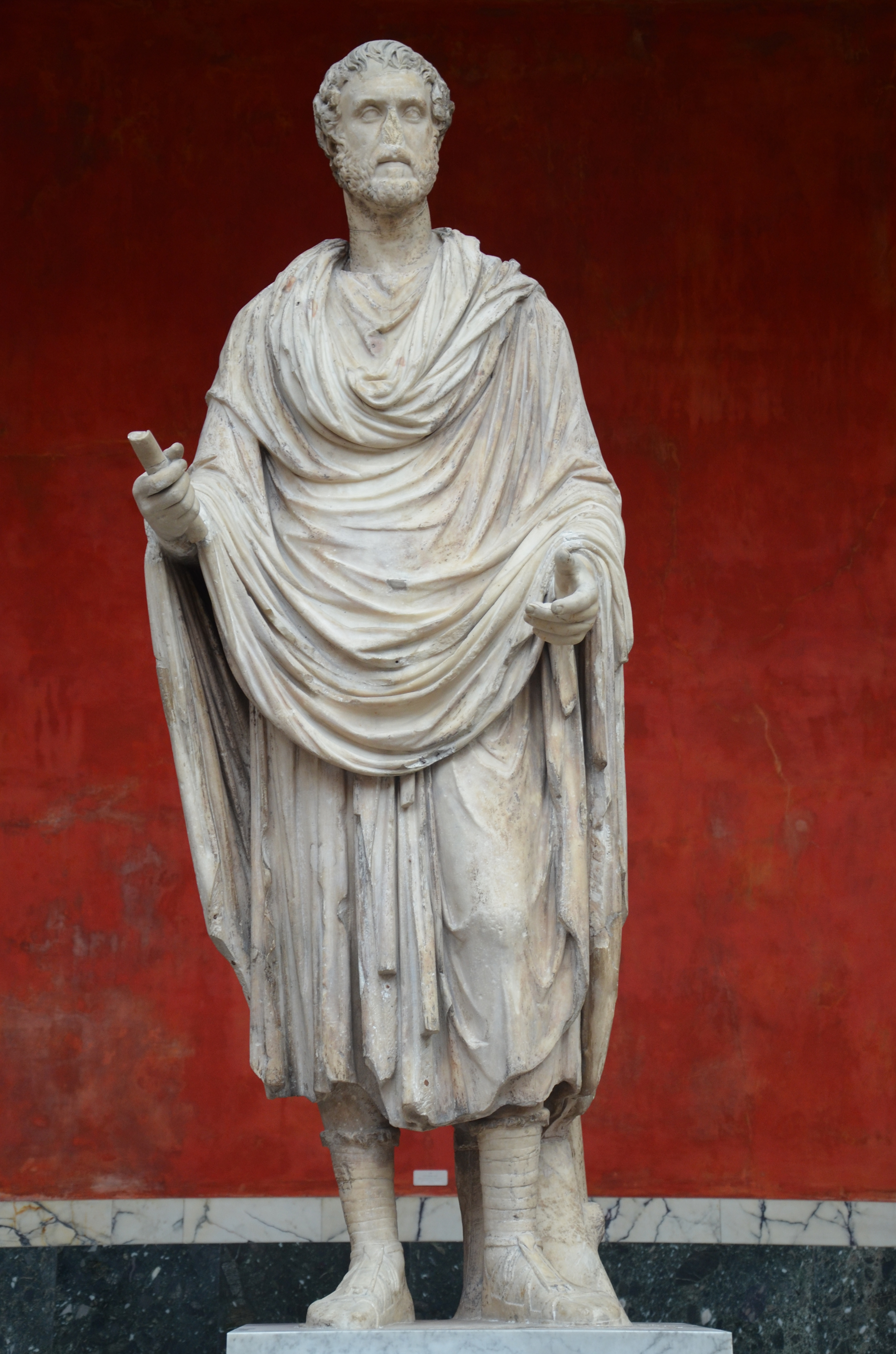
Togate statue of Antoninus Pius (r. 138–161) in the Ny Carlsberg Glyptotek.

Late republican practice and legal reform allowed the creation of standing armies, and opened a military career to any Roman citizen or freedman of good reputation. A soldier who showed the requisite "disciplined ferocity" in battle and was held in esteem by his peers and superiors could be promoted to higher rank: a plebeian could achieve equestrian status. Non-citizens and foreign-born auxiliaries given honourable discharge were usually granted citizenship, land or stipend, the right to wear the toga, and an obligation to the patron who had granted these honours; usually their senior officer. A dishonourable discharge meant infamia. Colonies of retired veterans were scattered throughout the Empire. In literary stereotype, civilians are routinely bullied by burly soldiers, inclined to throw their weight around.

Though soldiers were citizens, Cicero typifies the former as "sagum wearing" and the latter as "togati". He employs the phrase cedant arma togae ("let arms yield to the toga"), meaning "may peace replace war", or "may military power yield to civilian power", in the context of his own uneasy alliance with Pompey. He intended it as metonym, linking his own "power to command" as consul (imperator togatus) with Pompey's as general (imperator armatus); but it was interpreted as a request to step down. Cicero, having lost Pompey's ever-wavering support, was driven to exile. In reality, arms rarely yielded to civilian power. During the early Roman Imperial era, members of the Praetorian Guard (the emperor's personal guard as "First Citizen", and a military force under his personal command), concealed their weapons under white, civilian-style togas when on duty in the city, offering the reassuring illusion that they represented a traditional Republican, civilian authority, rather than the military arm of an Imperial autocracy.

== In religion ==
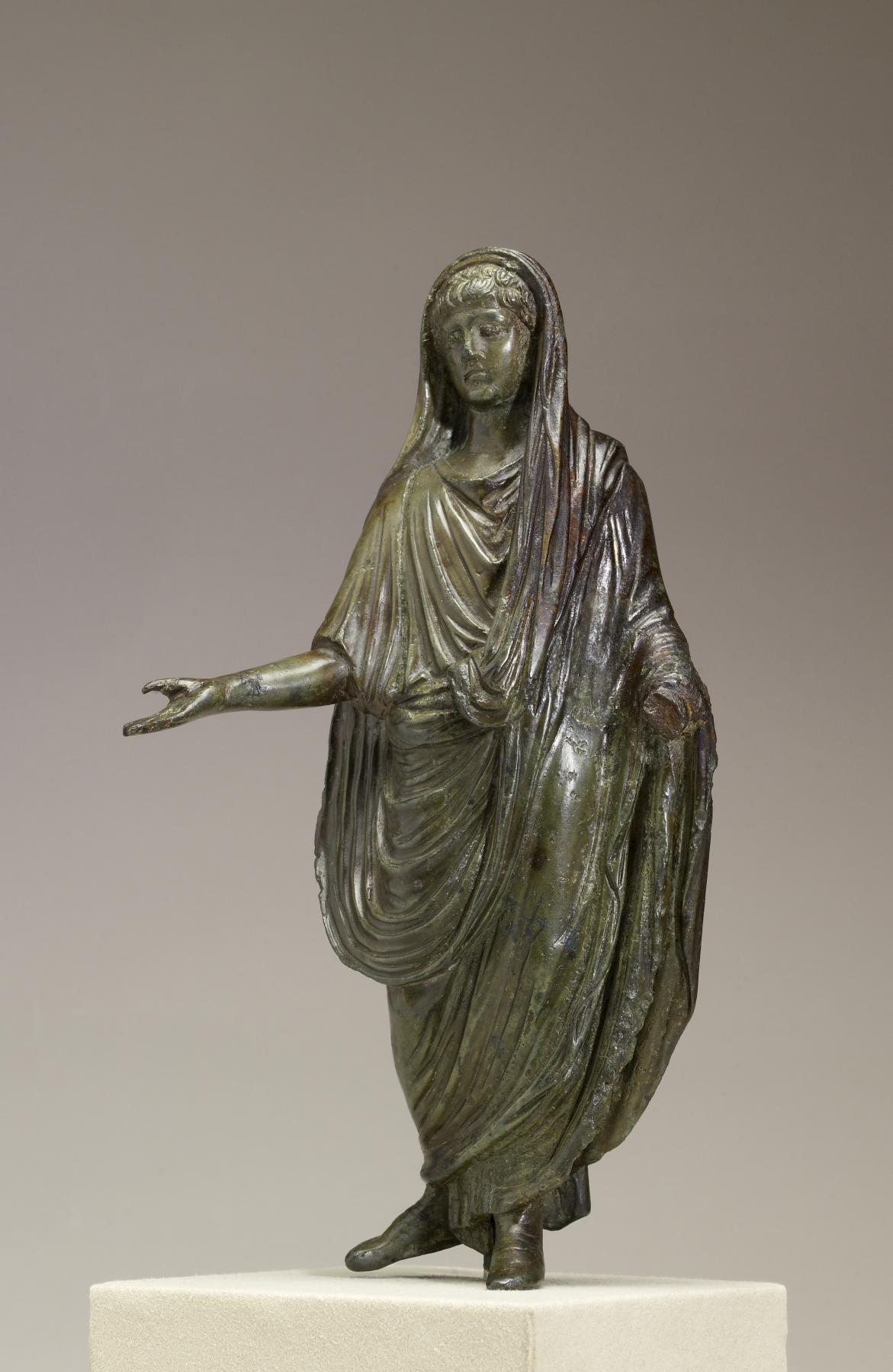
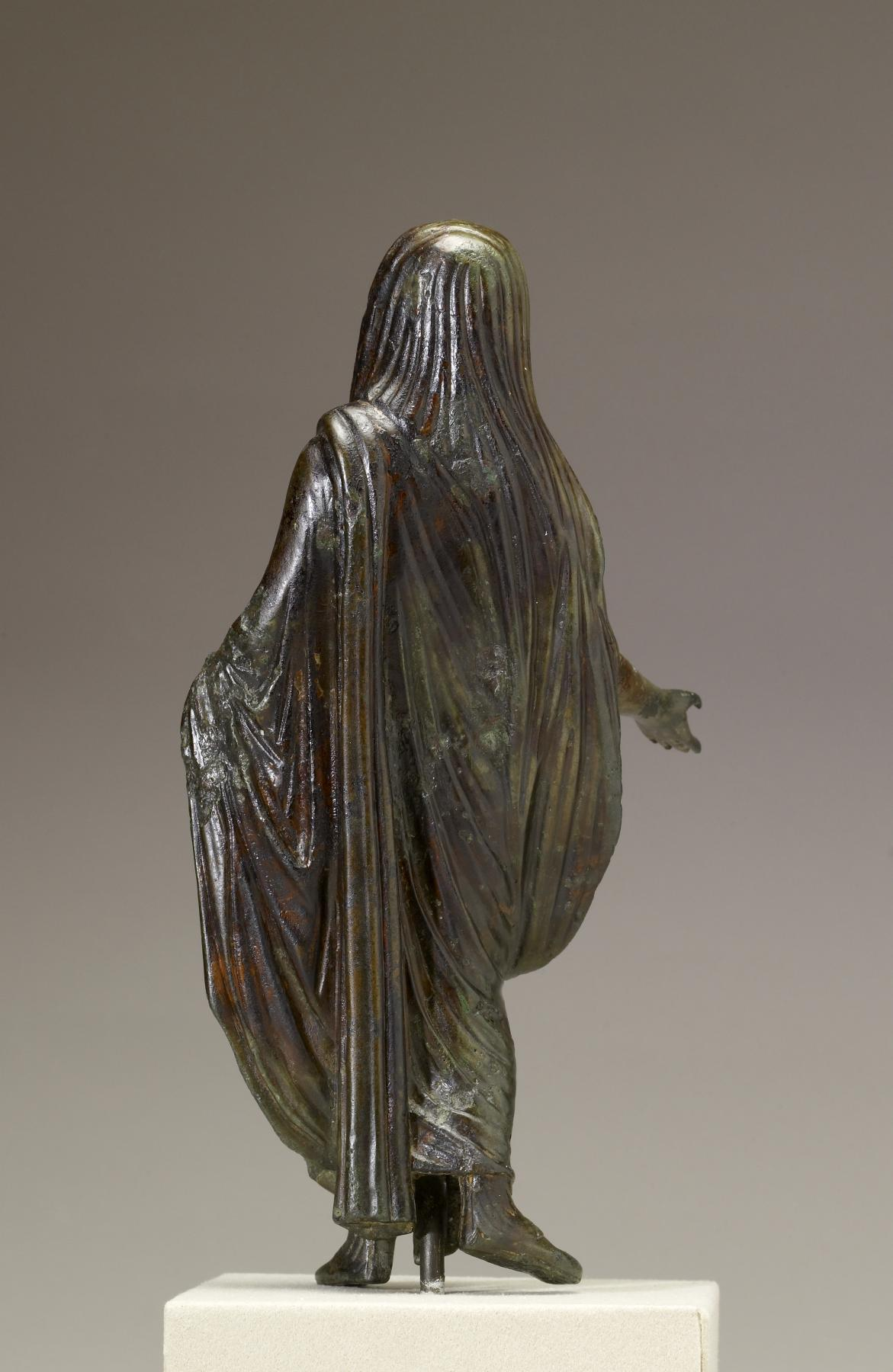
Statuette of a genius of a 1st-century AD official of the senatorial class, wearing a toga praetexta and with covered head, in priestly attitude.

Citizens attending Rome's frequent religious festivals and associated games were expected to wear the toga. The toga praetexta was the normal garb for most Roman priesthoods, which tended to be the preserve of high status citizens. When offering sacrifice, libation and prayer, and when performing augury, the officiant priest covered his head with a fold of his toga, drawn up from the back: the ritual was thus performed capite velato (with covered head). This was believed a distinctively Roman form, in contrast to Etruscan, Greek and other foreign practices. The Etruscans seem to have sacrificed bareheaded (capite aperto). In Rome, the so-called ritus graecus ("Greek rite") was used for deities believed Greek in origin or character; the officiant, even if a Roman citizen, wore Greek-style robes with wreathed or bare head, not the toga. It has been argued that the Roman expression of piety capite velato influenced Paul's prohibition against Christian men praying with covered heads.

An officiant capite velato who needed free use of both hands to perform ritual—as while plowing the sulcus primigenius undertaken at the founding of new colonies—could employ the "Gabine cinch" or "robe" (cinctus Gabinus) or "rite" (ritus Gabinus) which tied the toga back. This style, later said to have been part of Etruscan priestly dress, was associated by the Romans with their early wars with nearby Gabii and was thus used during Roman declarations of war.

== Materials ==
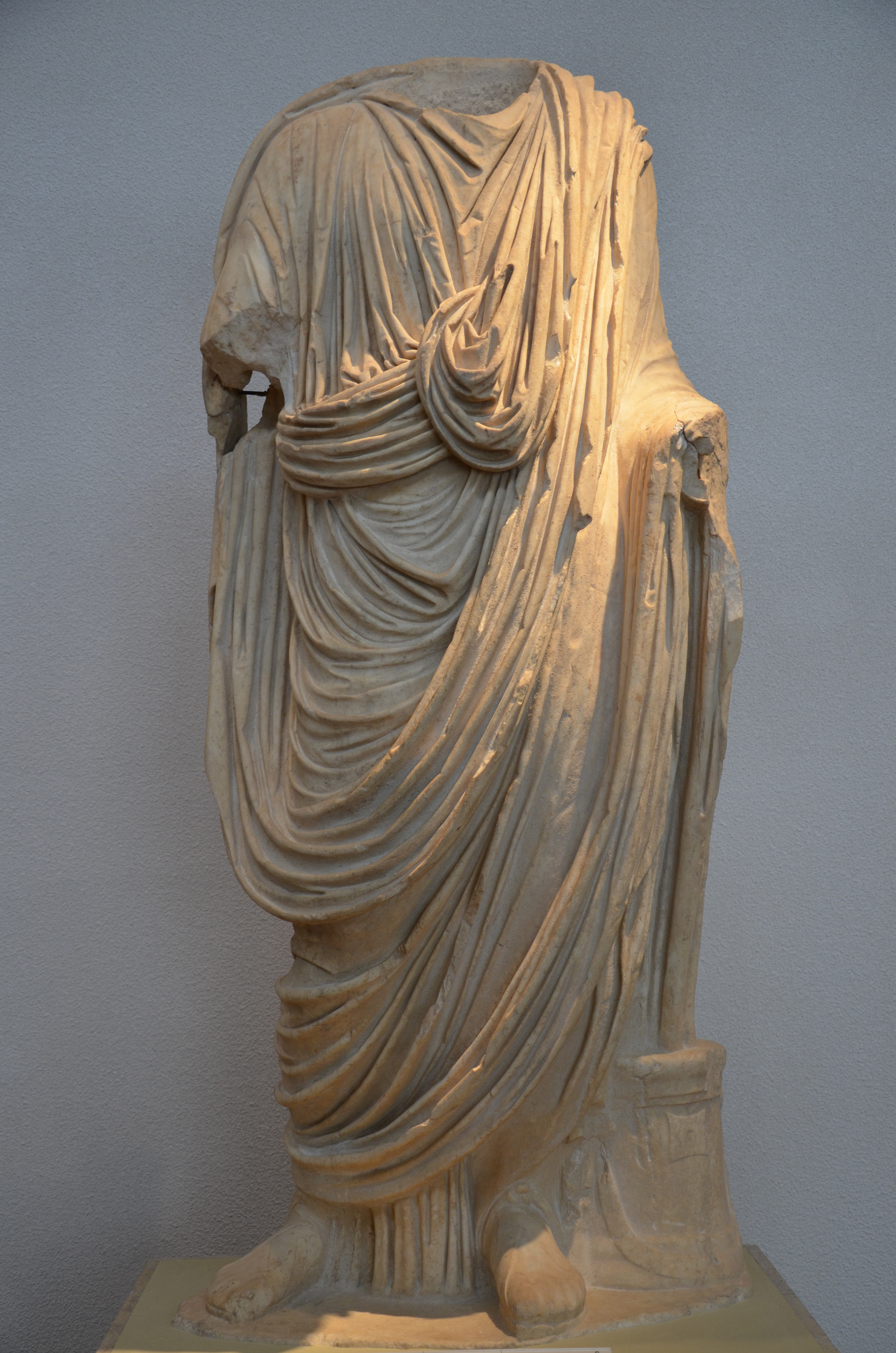
Togate statue in the Archaeological Museum of Olympia

The traditional toga was made of wool, which was thought to possess powers to avert misfortune and the evil eye; the toga praetexta (used by magistrates, priests and freeborn youths) was always woollen. Wool-working was thought a highly respectable occupation for Roman women. A traditional, high-status mater familias demonstrated her industry and frugality by placing wool-baskets, spindles and looms in the household's semi-public reception area, the atrium. Augustus was particularly proud that his wife and daughter had set the best possible example to other Roman women by, allegedly, spinning and weaving his clothing.

Hand-woven cloth was slow and costly to produce, and compared to simpler forms of clothing, the toga used an extravagant amount of it. To minimise waste, the smaller, old-style forms of toga may have been woven as a single, seamless, selvedged piece; the later, larger versions may have been made from several pieces sewn together; size seems to have counted for a lot. More cloth signified greater wealth and usually, though not invariably, higher rank. The purple-red border of the toga praetexta was woven onto the toga using a process known as "tablet weaving"; such applied borders are a feature of Etruscan dress.

Modern sources broadly agree that if made from a single piece of fabric, the toga of a high status Roman in the late Republic would have required a piece approximately 12 ft (3.7 m) in length; in the Imperial era, around 18 ft (5.5 m), a third more than its predecessor, and in the late Imperial era around 8 ft (2.4 m) wide and up to 18–20 ft (5.5–6.1 m) in length for the most complex, pleated forms.

=== Features and styles ===
The toga was draped, rather than fastened, around the body, and was held in position by the weight and friction of its fabric. Supposedly, no pins or brooches were employed. The more voluminous and complex the style, the more assistance would have been required to achieve the desired effect. In classical statuary, draped togas consistently show certain features and folds, identified and named in contemporary literature.

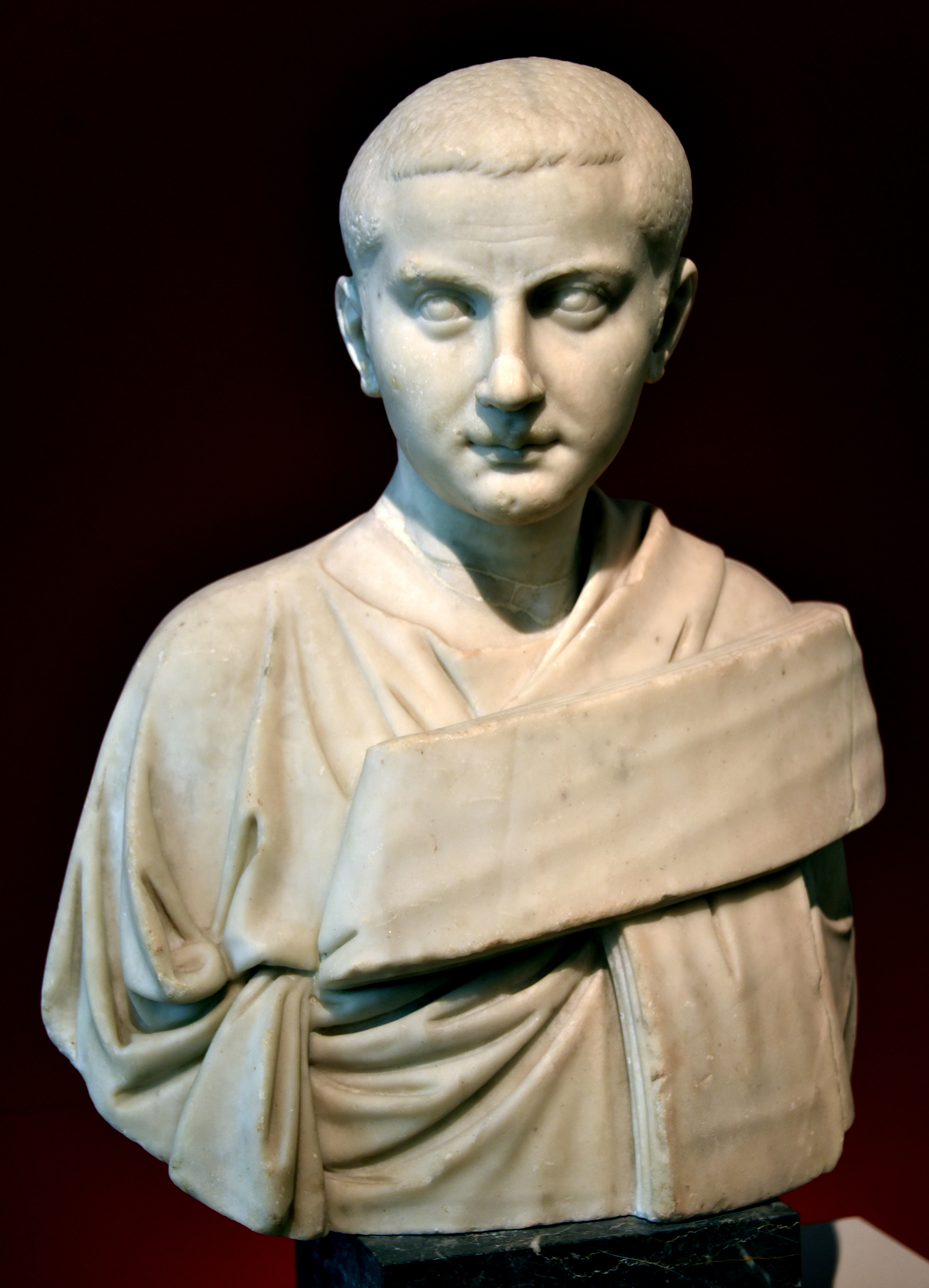
Portrait bust of the emperor Gordian III wearing a toga contabulata ("banded toga").

The sinus (literally, a bay or inlet) appears in the Imperial era as a loose over-fold, slung from beneath the left arm, downwards across the chest, then upwards to the right shoulder. Early examples were slender, but later forms were much fuller; the loop hangs at knee-length, suspended there by draping over the crook of the right arm.

The umbo (literally "knob") was a pouch of the toga's fabric pulled out over the balteus (the diagonal section of the toga across the chest) in imperial-era forms of the toga. Its added weight and friction would have helped (though not very effectively) secure the toga's fabric onto the left shoulder. As the toga developed, the umbo grew in size.

The most complex togas appear on high-quality portrait busts and imperial reliefs of the mid-to-late Empire, probably reserved for emperors and the highest civil officials. The so-called "banded" or "stacked" toga (Latinised as toga contabulata) appeared in the late 2nd century AD and was distinguished by its broad, smooth, slab-like panels or swathes of pleated material, more or less correspondent with umbo, sinus and balteus, or applied over the same. On statuary, one swathe of fabric rises from low between the legs, and is laid over the left shoulder; another more or less follows the upper edge of the sinus; yet another follows the lower edge of a more-or-less vestigial balteus then descends to the upper shin. As in other forms, the sinus itself is hung over the crook of the right arm. If its full-length representations are accurate, it would have severely constrained its wearer's movements. Dressing in a toga contabulata would have taken some time, and specialist assistance. When not in use, it required careful storage in some form of press or hanger to keep it in shape. Such inconvenient features of the later toga are confirmed by Tertullian, who preferred the pallium. High-status (consular or senatorial) images from the late 4th century show a further ornate variation, known as the "Broad Eastern Toga"; it hung to the mid-calf, was heavily embroidered, and was worn over two pallium-style undergarments, one of which had full length sleeves. Its sinus was draped over the left arm.

== Decline ==
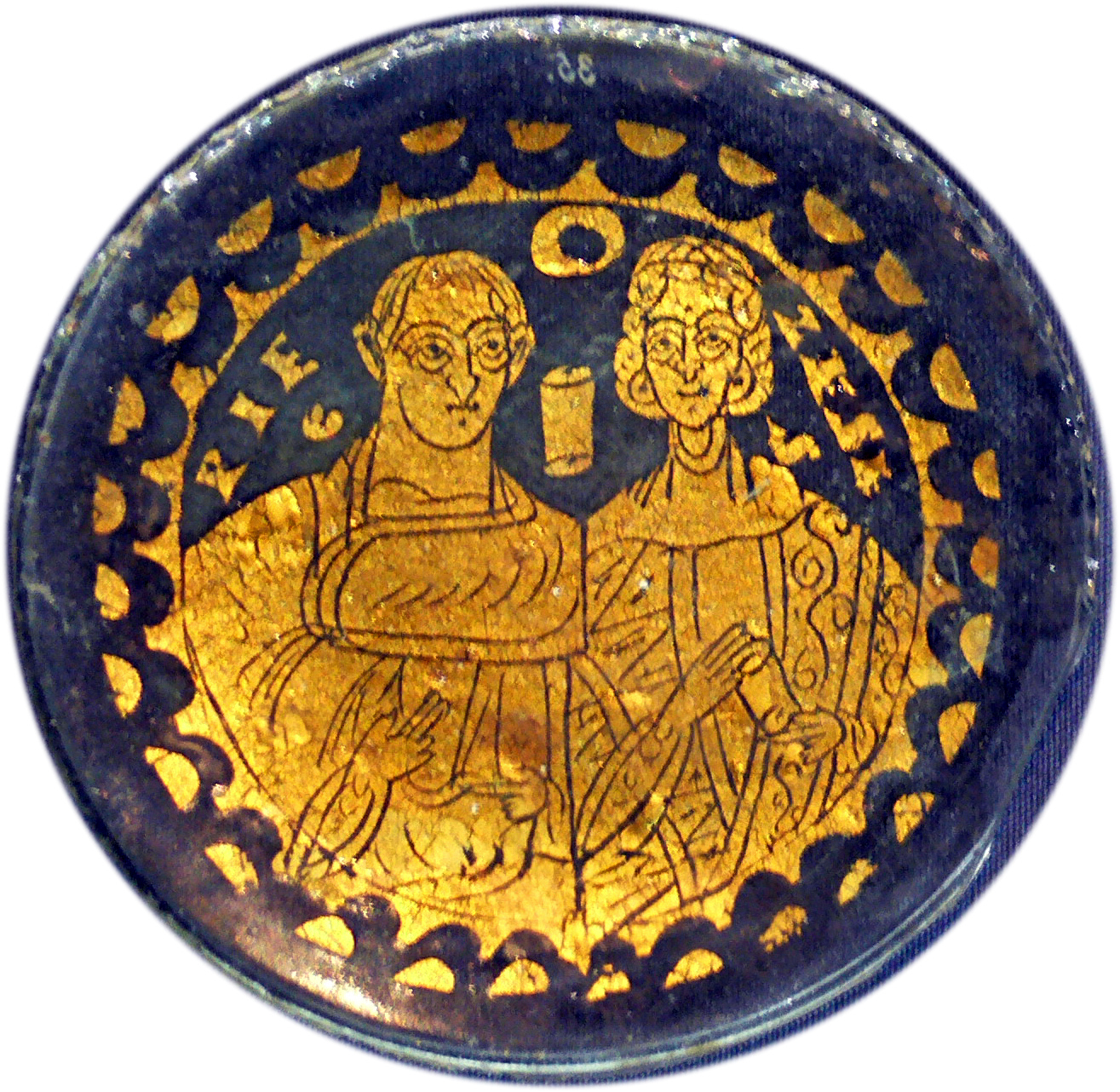
4th-century gold glass image of a married couple with the husband wearing a banded toga.

The toga saw both a gradual transformation and decline, punctuated by attempts to retain it as an essential feature of true Romanitas. It was never a popular garment: in the late 1st century, Tacitus disparaged the urban plebs as a vulgus tunicatus ("tunic-wearing crowd"); Hadrian issued an edict compelling equites and senators to wear the toga in public. The extension of citizenship, from around 6 million citizens under Augustus to between 40 and 60 million under the "universal citizenship" of Caracalla's Constitutio Antoniniana (212 AD), probably further reduced whatever distinctive value the toga still held for commoners, and accelerated its abandonment among their class. Meanwhile, the office-holding aristocracy adopted ever more elaborate, complex, costly and impractical forms of toga.

The toga nevertheless remained the formal costume of the Roman senatorial elite. A law issued by co-emperors Gratian, Valentinian II and Theodosius I in 382 AD (Codex Theodosianus 14.10.1) states that while senators in the city of Rome may wear the paenula in daily life, they must wear the toga when attending their official duties. Failure to do so would result in the senator being stripped of rank and authority, and of the right to enter the Curia Julia. Byzantine Greek art and portraiture show the highest functionaries of court, church and state in magnificently wrought, extravagantly exclusive court dress and priestly robes; some at least are thought to be versions of the Imperial toga. In the West, the kings and aristocrats of new European kingdoms styled their dress after that of late military generals rather than the senatorial order, and the toga thus did not survive the end of centralized Roman governance.

== See also ==
- Clothing in ancient Rome
- Tricivara
- Toga party
