= Clav =

Clav or clavi may refer to:

== Music ==
- Clavichord, a stringed keyboard instrument which produces sound by striking brass or iron strings with small metal blades
- Clavinet, an electrically amplified keyboard instrument

== People ==
- Clavicular (influencer), often shortened to "Clav", a live streamer and social media influencer

== See also ==
- Clavus (disambiguation)
