= Laticlave =

Purple band worn by Ancient Roman senators as an emblem of office

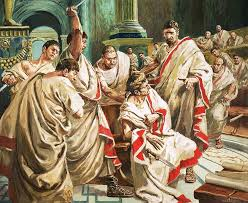
Artist's representation of the assassination of Caesar; various of the assassins are wearing laticlavia or angusticlavia according to their respective ranks.

In ancient Roman regalia, a laticlave or clavus was a broad stripe or band of purple on the fore part of the tunic, worn by senators as an emblem of office. The name laticlavia translates to 'broad nail' and figuratively 'broad stripe', in contrast to the 'narrow stripe' (angusticlavia) which appeared on the tunics of lower social ranks.

This ornament, according to some, was called clavus ('nail') as being set with little round plates of gold, or silver, like the heads of nails. Cantelius maintained that the clavus consisted of a kind of purple flowers, sewn upon the cloth.

The garment is mentioned in Suetonius, as citizens singing songs of disapproval against Julius Caesar for him having offered the opportunity for Gauls to "put on the laticlave" as imposter/foreign members of a traditionally "Roman" Senate.
