= Angusticlavia =

Tunic with two narrow purple stripes worn in ancient Rome

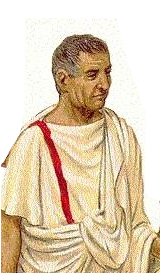
Picture of an equestrian dressed in his rank toga and tunic, the angusticlavia

In ancient Rome, an angusticlavia, angusticlavus or angustus clavus was a narrow-strip tunic (tunica) with two narrow vertical Tyrian purple stripes (clavi, singular clavus). The tunic was typically worn under the toga with the right side stripe visible.

== Usage and significance ==
The angusticlavia was the tunic associated with the rank and office of the eques, or equestrians, one of the two highest legal orders in aristocratic Rome. Order members were military men, often patricians (patrici), who served as the cavalry units in war. During times of peace they frequently served as personal assistants to Roman senators. Equestrians wore the angusticlavia under the trabea, a short toga of distinctive form and color. They also wore equestrian shoes (calcei), and a gold ring (anulus aureus). The tunic's stripes were about an inch wide, which contrasted with the senator's laticlavus, which bore three-inch wide stripes.

The angusticlavia's purple-hued bands distinguished members of the equestrian order from other Roman dignitaries and from regular citizens. In ancient Rome, the color purple became increasingly linked to the higher classes, and eventually to the emperor and the empire's magistrates. Thus, the angusticlavia served to indicate social status above regular citizenry but below senators and magistrates.

On certain occasions, particularly during times of political or social upheaval, senators in Rome chose to wear the equestrian tunic as a public display of distress. This practice was part of the semi-egalitarian legacy of the Republic. In 58 BCE, when the tribune of the plebs Clodius was pushing Cicero into exile, the senators took on the angusticlavia in public protest. In 53 BCE, during a period of civic violence, the consuls put aside their senatorial dress (the laticlavus) and summoned the Senate in equestrian attire (the angusticlavia). Over the course of ancient Roman history, the angusticlavia lost its symbolic meaning and class association. Wall paintings and other representations of the Roman past "show all types of men and boys wearing stripes of similar width – but there were later attempts to enforce or reintroduce the senatorial and equestrian classes".

== Etymology ==
The Latin word angusticlavia is compounded of angustus ('narrow'; 'small') and clavus ('nail'; 'stud'). The word clavus, or 'nail', refers to the stripes, for being as long as nails. The term angustus, or 'narrow', refers to these stripes or ornaments as being slimmer than on the senatorial laticlavus.

== See also ==
- Clothing in ancient Rome
- Laticlavus
- Tribunus angusticlavius
