= Coinage of Cales =

Coinage of Cales, Italy

Litra (?)
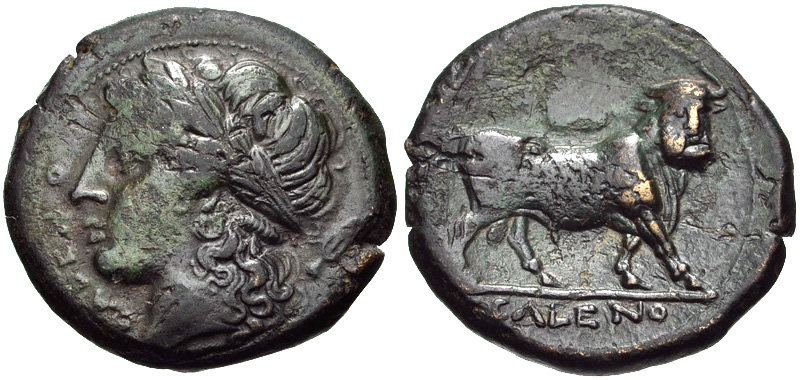
First side of the image: Laureate head of Apollo at left; spearhead behind
Second side of the image: Man-headed bull moving to the right; lyre at top.
Æ 3rd century BC.; ref.: Sambon 922, SNG ANS 175
Litra (?)
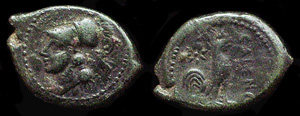
First side of the image: Head of Minerva with Corinthian helmet
Second side of the image: CALENO; standing rooster, star behind.
Æ 3rd century BC.

The coinage of Cales concerns coins minted in Cales, a city in Campania, the most important urban center of the ancient Italic population of the Ausones. Cales was located on the Via Latina, halfway between the mountains of Samnium and the plains of Campania felix, a few kilometers north of Casilinum (present-day Capua) and just south of Teanum Sidicinum.

Καὶ ἡ ἐφεξῆς ἡ τῶν Καληνῶν καὶ αὕτη ἀξιόλογος, συνάπτουσα τῷ Κασιλίνῳ. [...] Πρὸς δὲ ταῖς ῥηθείσαις ἔτι καὶ αὗται Καμπαναὶ πόλεις εἰσιν ὧν ἐμνήσθημεν πρότερον, Κάλης τε καῖ Τέανον Σιδικῖνον.
Next comes the city of the Caleni, also important, very close to Casilinum [...]. In addition to those described, those mentioned earlier belong to Campania: Cales and Teanum Sidicinum [...].

—Strabo, Geography, V, 3, 9; V, 4, 11

The archaeological site is located in the municipality of Calvi Risorta, a short distance from the town.

The city minted coins in the period between 268 BC and the Second Punic War. The coins of Cales are included among those issued by colonies and allies of Rome, in an area centered around ancient Campania. After the Second Punic War, Cales, like most centers in Roman Italy, no longer minted its own coins and used Roman coinage centered on the denarius.

Traditionally numismatists treat Calenian coins as Greek coinage.

== Cataloging ==
No text specifically devoted to the coinage of Cales has been published. The text with the most extensive coverage is the one published by Arthur Sambon, a French scholar, entitled Les monnaies antiques de l'Italie, and published in Paris in 1903. The book treats, despite its title, only part of ancient Italy, namely central Italy and Campania. The coins pertinent to Cales are numbered from 885 to 973 and divided into silver coins (885-915) and bronze coins. These, in turn, are differentiated into three groups: those with the head of Pallas and the rooster (916-918), those with the head of Apollo and the man-headed bull, that is, a bull with a human face, surmounted by the lyre (919-953) or by a star (954-967), or with nothing (968), and those in which above the man-headed bull is depicted a winged Victory crowning him (969-973). Thus in the catalogs one finds a reference of the type "Sambon" followed by the number.

A less thorough but still sufficient analysis is found in Historia Numorum - Italy, a text published in Great Britain in 2001 by a group of numismatists coordinated by Keith N. Rutter. This text considers only the major types. Catalogs include a type reference "HN" or "HN Italy" followed by the number: 434 for the silver didrachm with Athena on the obverse and Victory on a biga on the reverse, 435 for Minerva and the rooster, and 436 for Apollo and the bull.

Other cataloging sources are the Sylloge Nummorum Graecorum. Generally, the most recent or most widely available ones are used, such as that of the American Numismatic Society, Copenhagen, and France. For bronzes, the Sylloge of the Morcom Collection, a British-based collection of bronzes from the Greek West, is also used. The catalogs contain an abbreviated Sylloge designation, such as "ANS," "Cop.", "France," or "Morcom," followed by the number of the coin depicted.

== Historical context ==
The city, according to Livy, was conquered by the Romans in 335 B.C., and the following year it became a colony under Latin law, that is, a colony with administrative autonomy, the first in the area. The other cities in the area came into the Roman orbit, either as colonies or as socii, in the following period.

In 209 B.C., during the Second Punic War, twelve colonies, including Cales, sent legates to Rome, where they refused to give the aid that had been requested of them under the formula togatorum. With the war over, Rome deeply reduced the autonomy previously granted. Among the autonomies lost was the right of coinage.

== Monetary context ==
Monetary context
Location of the centers

In the period between the First and Second Punic Wars, new coins with similar characteristics appeared in a group of cities linked to Rome.

These are bronze coins that feature two types:

- one type shows on the obverse the head of Apollo turned to the left and on the reverse a man-headed bull, crossing to the right, identical to the one used in the coinage of Neapolis in the same period;
- the other features Minerva's head with Corinthian helmet on the obverse and a standing rooster on the reverse. These coins are similar in style to Roman coins of the same period.

Some of these cities exclusively minted coins with Apollo, others only those with Minerva, and others both.

In addition to the types mentioned, some of the cities also minted didrachms of Campanian foot and in addition other bronze coins with different types. The cities are all located in Latium adiectum, Campania, and the Volturno basin.

Mint	Apollo	Minerva	Didrachm	Other bronze
Aesernia	× (S. 175-182)			× (S. 183 / 184-189)
Aquinum		× (S. 166-170)
Caiatia		× (S. 974-976)
Cales	× (S. 919-967)	× (S. 916-918)	× (S. 885-915)
Compulteria	× (S. 1066-73)
Suessa	× (S. 877-884)	× (S. 873)	× (S. 852-869)	× (S. 870-872)
Teanum Sidicinum	× (S. 989-1002)	× (S. 1004)	× (S. 977-988)	× (S. 1003)
Telesia		× (S. 174)
Cataloging according to Sambon, 1903, in parentheses

The cities share not only types but also coins and some identifying marks, such as the recurring acronym ΙΣ. The symbols used to distinguish individual issues also tend to overlap, at least for the cities, with a more conspicuous number of issues. The symbols used also largely overlap with those on the coeval coins of Neapolis and Rome.

These coincidences, the simultaneous presence of coins from these cities, in the treasures that have come down to us, alongside those from Neapolis and Rome, stylistic congruities and more, have led scholars to speculate on some form of common circulation and the existence of a common authority to control coinage.

== Coins ==
=== Cast coinage ===
In the past, a series of cast coins, which feature a kantharos on the reverse, has been attributed to Cales. According to Barclay Vincent Head, who quotes Ernst Haeberlin, the type on the reverse, a kantharos, would have indicated the city's two main activities: the production of Calenian wine and the manufacture of pottery. Head identifies the kantharos in this context with a calix ("cup" in Latin) and notes the similarity between the word calix and the name of the city. Sambon does not mention this series. This hypothesis is ignored by more recent authors or specifically rejected.

This series is catalogued as Thurlow - Vecchi 254-260.

Stater
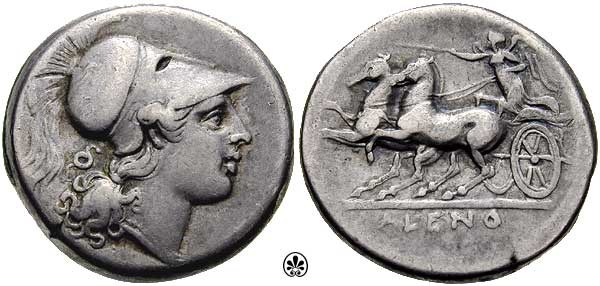
First side of the image: Athena: on the helmet a wing, a snake behind the head.
Second side of the image: Right hand on top with whip, left hand on bottom with reins
Sambon 902

=== Silver ===
The city minted staters (or didrachms) of Campanian or Phocaean foot. The Campanian stater weighs 7.5 grams and is divided into two drachmas. The foot adopted was originally used by the colonies founded by the Phocians, such as Massalia and Velia. It was adopted by Neapolis and later by other cities in the area.

The obverse of the Cales didrachm features the bejeweled head of Athena, with Corinthian helmet adorned with feathers. There may be various symbols: on the helmet, behind the head. Sometimes there are letters under the neck in the Greek alphabet. The type with the head of Athena is widely used in the coinage of the Greek world, such as in the coins of Athens and Corinth.

The reverse depicts Nike driving a chariot, holding a whip in her right hand and reins in her left. In the exergue is the demonym CALENO in the Latin alphabet.

Sambon catalogs the silver coins with the numbers 885 to 915. The main variants are determined by the position of the goddess and chariot:

Athena turned to the left - left chariot (Sambon 885 - 887; 889 - 893)
Athena turned to the right - right chariot (Sambon 888)
Athena turned to the right - left chariot (Sambon 894 - 915)

The other variations on the reverse are the position of Nike's hands, right side up and left side down or vice versa.

More numerous are the variants on the obverse, which can differ in the symbol behind Athena's head (wing, bow, etc.), the decoration on the helmet (snake, cornucopia, pentagram), and the letter under the neck (Γ, Ω, Θ etc.). In all, Sambon classifies thirty-one variants. Others were catalogued later, as a result of finds and catalogs published later but still not substantially changing the overall picture. The style is that of the coeval coins of Neapolis.

==== The drachma ====
Drachma
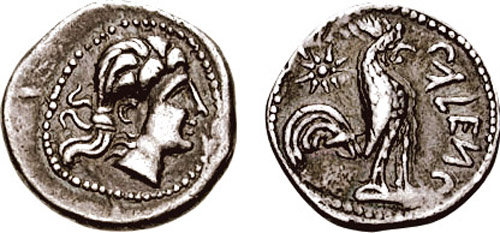
First side of the image: Apollo, with long hair fastened by a ribbon
Second side of the image: CALENC, standing rooster at right, star at back.
AR 3,65 g, 4h

There are also drachmas attributable to Cales. Sambon describes (but does not catalog), in the part devoted to the city of Cales, after the staters, a drachma, found in the Vienna collection: male head (described dubiously as Apollo) on the obverse right and rooster on the reverse, behind an eight-rayed star.

Similar coins are illustrated in later published catalogs. One is in the Fitzwilliam Museum, part of the Mc Clean collection and described as pertaining to Cales. Three others are in the Budapest collection. While the first is described as pertaining to Cales, the other two, of considerably less weight and with poorer stylistic features, were judged by the curator to be Celtic imitation obols.

=== Bronze ===
Two main groups of bronze coins were minted at Cales: those with Minerva/Gallus and the one with Apollo/man-headed bull; coins from the Apollo type have several main variants. In both cases they are fiduciary coins, that is, coins whose value is not determined by their metal content.

These coins are present, as well as in others, in the treasure found at Pietrabbondante (Bovianum Vetus) and described by Gabrici. The find is listed as IGCH (Inventory of Greek Coin Hoards) 1986, Noe 816, and Crawford RRCH 24.

In the second half of last November a coin hoard, found in the province of Campobasso, on the site of ancient Bovianum Vetus, now Pietrabbondante, was sold to the National Museum in Naples. The hoard contains seventeen pieces of aes grave and two hundred and fifty-six bronze coins, from various cities of Campania and especially from Neapolis. So great, in my opinion, is the importance of this repository, that I deem it necessary to make an extended report, covering those points in the monetary and political history of Campania.

— Ettore Gabrici

The list of coins includes bronzes from some of the cities already mentioned:

- Rome 2 litrae (of the Apollo/ lion type and demonym ROMANO)
- Aesernia 13
- Aquinum 1
- Cales 25
- Neapolis 126
- Nola 3
- Suessa 16
- Teanum Sidicinum 1.

The finding is important for two points:

1. some coins from Neapolis are struck on coins from Cales (of the Apollo/bull type) and on coins from Aesernia;
2. Minerva/Gallus type coins appear more worn than Apollo/Bull coins, which are fresher.

The earliest date of the concealment of this hoard is given to us by the coins of Aesernia, which cannot be earlier than 263 B.C., the year of the deductio of a Latin colony in that city.

— Ettore Gabrici

Three of the Cales coins are of the Minerva/Gallus type and the others of the various Apollo/man-headed bull types.

==== Minerva ====
Minerva / rooster
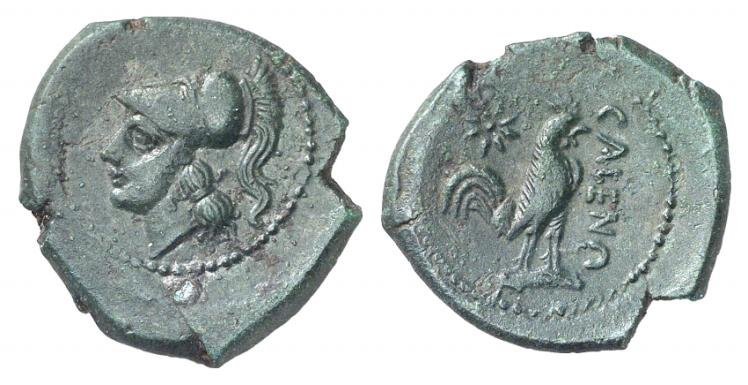
First side of the image: Minerva on the left
Second side of the image: Rooster on the right, at the back a star, at the front CALENO.
Æ 5,85 g; Sambon 916
Minerva / rooster
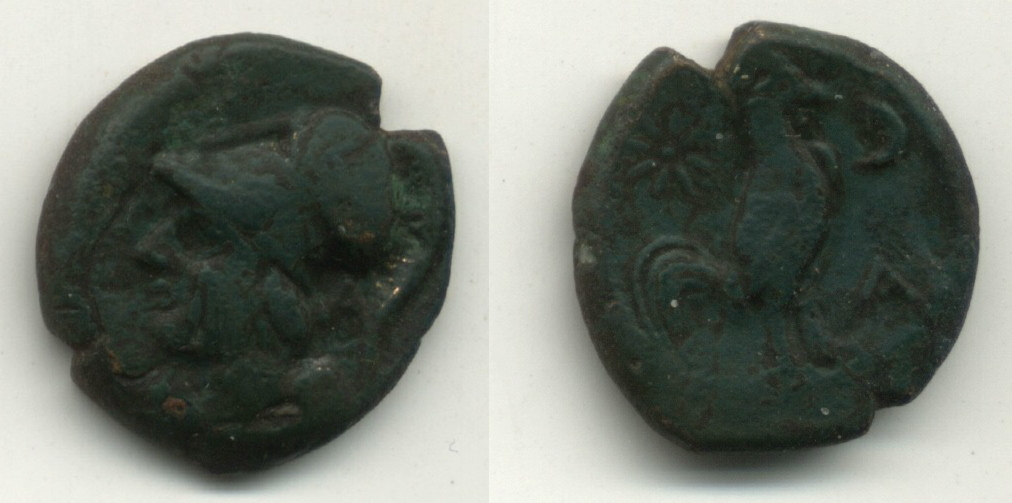
First side of the image: Minerva on the left
Second side of the image: Rooster on right, at back a star, in front a crescent and letter A
Æ, Sambon 917

The group of coins with the type of Minerva and the rooster is one of two groups of the bronze coinage of Cales. A. Sambon identifies three series characterized by the type of "Pallas" (Athena in French) on the obverse and a rooster on the reverse; the series are those numbered 916, 917 and 918.

The head of the goddess, depicted on the obverse is turned to the left and wears a Corinthian helmet with a long hackle. This side of the coin is completed by a circle of dots. The helmet is worn on the nape of the neck leaving the face uncovered. The type depicted on the obverse is similar to that of the quincunx of Larino and Luceria and other coins including a Roman litra. The variants of the Calenian coins of this group, as far as the obverse is concerned, are those determined by the position of the head (right or left) and the presence or absence of the demonym.

The reverse, as seen, depicts a standing rooster, facing to the right. In front of the rooster is the legend with the demonym. Behind it is an eight-rayed star. The variant concerns a type that has the demonym on the obverse and on the reverse has in front of the rooster, at the top, a crescent and at the bottom the letter Α.

The picture of the variants, according to Sambon, is depicted in the table.

Sambon	Obverse	Reverse
916	Minerva on the left	Rooster - star. In front CALENO
917	Minerva on the left. In front CALENO	Rooster - star. In front crescent and A
918	Minerva on the right	Rooster - star. In front CALENO

The type with Minerva and the rooster, as already seen, is also found in other cities in the area.

==== Apollo ====
Apollo / bull - lyre
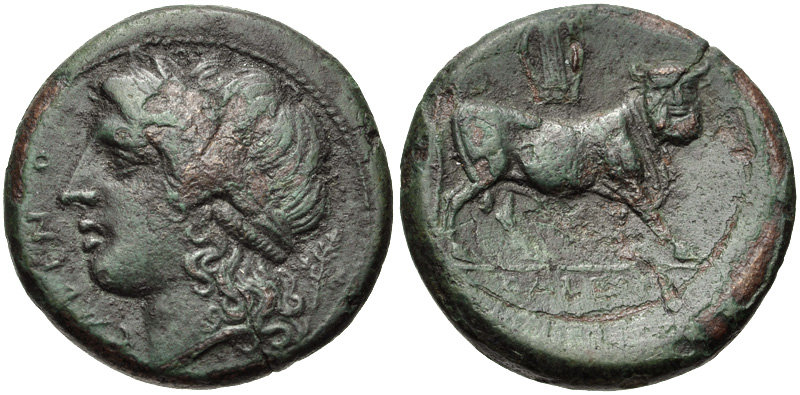
Æ 6,09 g; Sambon –
Apollo / bull - lyre
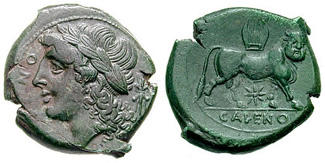
Æ 6,71 g; Sambon 923

The other group of bronze coins features on the obverse the head of Apollo, encircled by a laurel wreath, mostly turned to the left, and on the reverse a man-headed bull, that is, a bull with a human face. This creature represents the god Achelous or more generally a river deity. Coeval coins from Neapolis show the same type, with Apollo on the obverse and the bull on the reverse. In Neapolis coins a Nike crowns the bull. Cales coins of the Apollo/bull type are evidently influenced by those of Neapolis.

In this group Sambon, based on the reverse, distinguishes four subgroups. All feature the head of Apollo on the obverse. The differences are given by the element that is depicted above the man-headed bull. Almost all subgroups have multiple variants.

Sambon	Obverse	Reverse
919-953	Apollo	Bull / lyre
954-967	Apollo	Bull / star (with 6, 8 or 16 rays)
968	Apollo	Bull
969-973	Apollo	Bull / Nike

The type catalogued as Sambon 968 is found only in the Paris collection: no symbol is represented above the bull. The type with Apollo/bull, as already seen, is also found in other cities in the area.

===== Bull/lyre =====
The obverse depicts the head of Apollo, which is turned to the left except in two series (Sambon 919 and 920). In front is the legend with the demonym, CALENO. Behind the head generally a symbol is depicted. There are about twenty different symbols.

On the reverse is depicted the man-headed bull and at the top a lyre (or kithara). Below the exergue line is CALENO except for a few series (Sambon 944-949. The reverses differ from each other in the letters of the Greek alphabet present between the bull's legs. In one series (Sambon 923) instead of the letter a star is represented, in others there are no letters, and in six series as already seen the demonym below the exergue line is missing.

===== Bull/star =====
Apollo / bull - star
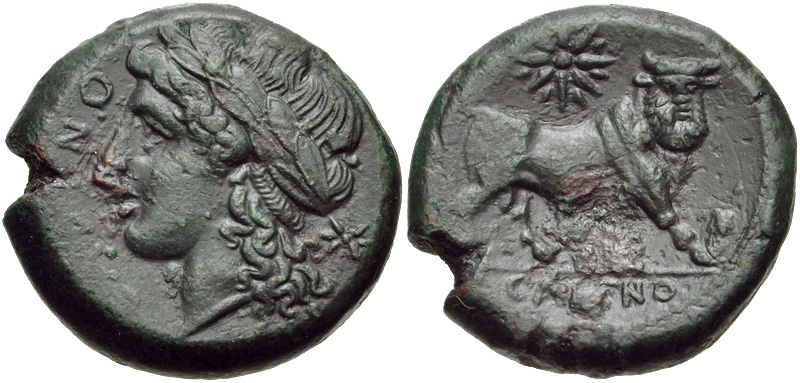
Æ 20mm, 7,09 g; Sambon 964

Six-pointed star.

The coins have on the obverse the head of Apollo, encircled by a laurel wreath, turned to the left. In front is the demonym, CALENO, and behind a symbol (club, gladius, star, or scepter). Some series have neither symbol nor letter. The reverse depicts the Campanian bull. Above the bull is a star and below a symbol (eight-ray star) or a Greek letter. Some series have neither symbol nor letter. Below the exergue line is the demonym, CALENO.

Coins that have the bull with a star on the reverse are cataloged by Sambon from 954 to 967. In the early series (954-965) the star has sixteen rays, in the 966 series it has eight, and in 967 it has six. The star with sixteen and the one with eight rays is drawn by means of short graver strokes, one per ray.

In the coins with the six-rayed star (Sambon 967) this is depicted by a pyramid built on a concave polygon (a dodecagon) with six points. The coins have the letter Γ (gamma) below the bull; there is a variant, not noted by Sambon, in which the letter is preceded by a dot (.Γ).

===== Bull/Nike =====
Bull - Nike
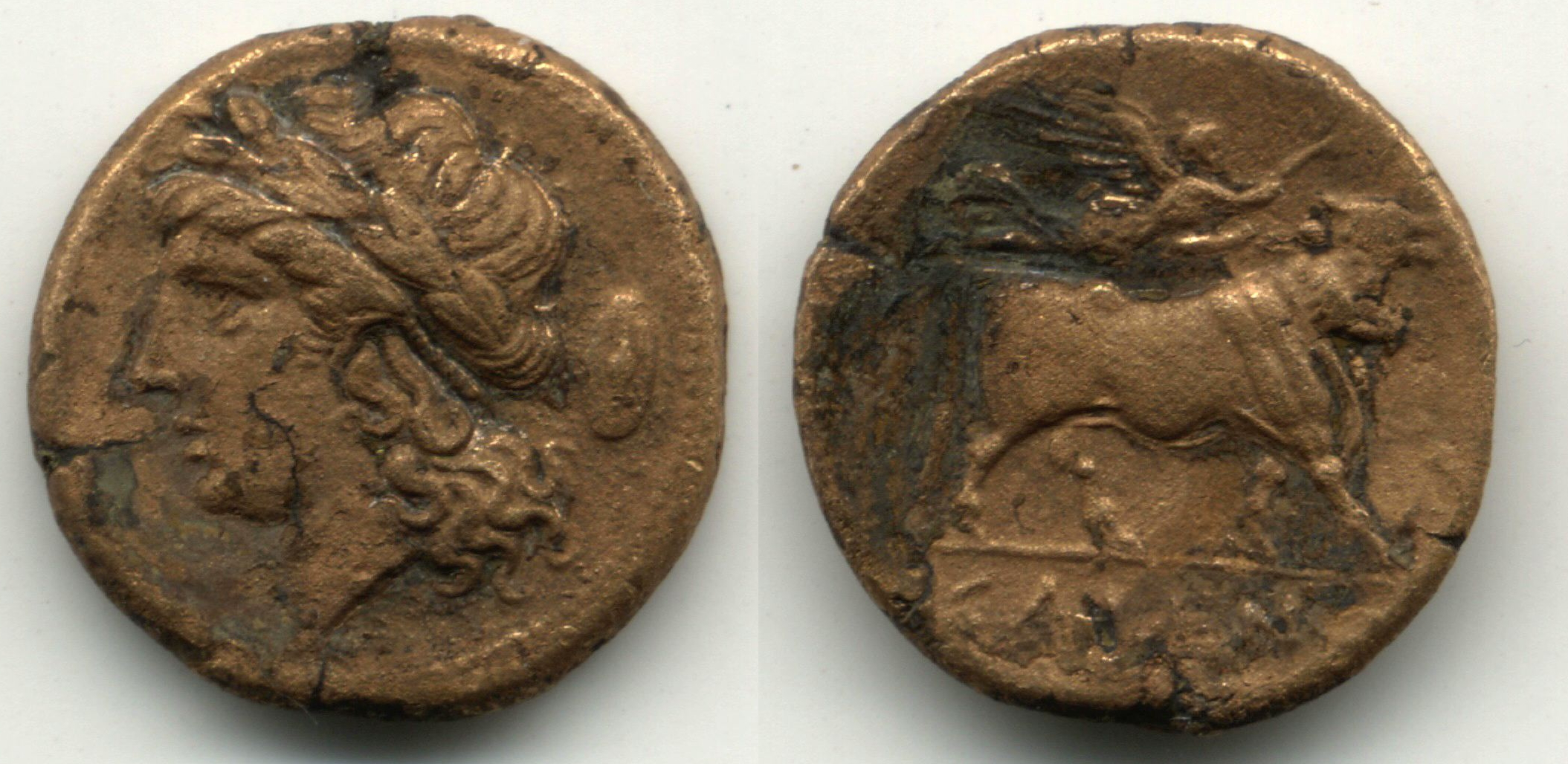
Æ Sambon 970

Also in this group the obverse depicts the head of Apollo with a laurel wreath. In some series there is a symbol (shield) or a Greek letter (Ν) behind the head. The reverse depicts the man-headed bull and above it Nike in flight crowning him. Underneath there may be a Greek letter (Α or Π). In the exergue is the demonym, CALENO.

The type of these coins is identical to coeval coins minted in Neapolis. Sambon identifies five variants (969-973), differentiated by symbol and letter.

== Findings ==
Thompson et al. (IGHC) report 11 treasure finds. An additional 1994 find containing 163 silver coins was published later in 1999.

IGCH	Location	Date found	Burial date (B.C.)	Quantity of Calenian coins and metal	Other coins
1986	Pietrabbondante	1899	265-60	25 Æ	17 aes grave and 162 Æ Romano-Campanian and Campanian
1995	Morino	1830 ca.	240-30	"many" Æ	"many" Æ Romano-Campanian and Campanian
2005	Italy	1862	230 ca.	"many" bulls; "some" roosters	Æ "some" Romano-Campanian and "many" Campanian
2009	Southern Italy	1969	225 ca.	1 stater	24 staters; 1 quadrigatus
2011	Sessa Aurunca	1930 ca.	220 ca.	Apollo / bull star 1	9 didrachms; 5 quadrachms, 5 broken quadrachms, and 16 half quadrachms; Naples 1 Æ; 1 half-uncia ROMA
2012	Naples	1931	220	5 staters	41 staters; 26 Roman didrachms, 79 quadrigati
2031	Cava de' Tirreni	1907	late 3rd century	1 Æ	72 Æ, 50 aes grave and Roman coins.
2034	Ascoli	1883	late 3rd century	4 staters	25 staters, 10 Roman didrachms, 48 quadrigati
2048	Tortoreto	1896	200 ca.	2 Æ	47 Æ and 196 Roman bronzes
–	San Martino in Pensilis	1994	–	12 staters	151 other AR
2210	Vulcano	1896 ca.	250 ca.	1 stater	63 other AR
2229	Polizzi Generosa	1957	250-200	4 Æ	other 350 Æ

Four other finds are mentioned by Thomsen. These are not treasures but votive deposits, i.e., donations to deities, and consequently the coins in them were deposited at different times. It is not possible to make chronological analyses on these finds, as there are coins that circulated in periods far apart, but nevertheless they are relevant for identifying the area of circulation of the coins. The deposits in question are those from Vicarello, Carsoli, Tivoli and Nemi. Based on the finds, the area of circulation, apart from the two relevant treasures in Sicily, is central Italy.

== Legends and epigraphy ==
The legends on the coins are reduced to the demonym (CALENO) and the letters used to differentiate the various issues instead of symbols.

For the demonym the alphabet used is Latin. Differences from modern spelling can be detected in the shape of the letters "L," "A," and "O."

- The letter "L" has an archaic shape similar to the shape of the corresponding Etruscan letter, with the horizontal stroke facing upward.
- The letter "A" also occurs in an archaic form with the horizontal stroke slanting downward.
- The letter "O" sometimes occurs open at the bottom.

Letters of the Greek alphabet are used as symbols. In particular, the differences found from modern spelling are:

- Θ (theta) Is rendered with a circle with a central point (Sambon 914, 937, 960).
- Ζ (zeta) is rendered with a vertical stroke between two horizontals of equal length, sometimes it is confused with the "I" (Sambon 933, 934, 948)
- Ι (iota) Is always rendered with a single vertical stroke (Sambon 935, 936, 950-953, the latter in ΙΣ - iota sigma)
- Π (pi) has the right vertical side shorter (Sambon 940, 965)

== Weights and alloys ==
There are no specific studies on the quality of the metal used. As a rule, however, in the period the silver alloy was the best one obtainable with the procedures of the time. The foot used is the same as in the coinage of Neapolis and other coeval coinage in the area, the so-called Campanian or Phocaean foot, with a stater with a theoretical weight of 7.5 grams, divided into two drachms.

Data from the most recent SNGs are given.

Catalog	Specimens	Minimum weight	Maximum weight	Average weight	Notes
ANS	4 (170-174)	7,05	7,25	7,138	Specimen 171 is a fourrée stater
Copenhagen	6 (301-306)	6,65	7,35	7,06
France	17 (414-432)	6,58	7,40	7,27	Specimens 423 and 425 are fourrée staters.
N.B. fourrée coins were not calculated in the average weights.

== See also ==
- Cales
- Ausones

== Bibliography ==
- Livy, Ab Urbe condita libri.
- Boutin, Serge (1979). Catalogue des monnaies Grecques antiques de l'ancienne collection Pozzi. Monnaies frappées en Europe. Maastricht: A.G. Van der Dussen. ISBN 9789070296018.
- Ceglia, Valeria (1999). "Il tesoretto monetale di San Martino in Pensilis" (PDF). Bollettino di numismatica. p. 202.
- Ettore Gabrici (1900). "Pietrabbondante. Ripostiglio di monete di bronzo antiche, della Campania, proveniente dal territorio di Bovianum Vetus". Notizie degli scavi. R. Accademia dei Lincei. pp. 645–656.
- Grose, Sidney William (1923). The Fitzwilliam Museum: Catalogue of the Mc Clean Collection of Greek Coins, Vol. I: Western Europe, Magna Graecia, Sicily (PDF). Cambridge: Cambridge University Press.
- Ernst Haeberlin (1910). Aes Grave: das Schwergeld Roms und Mittelitaliens. Francoforte sul Meno: Forni. pp. 146–149.
- Head, Barclay Vincent (1911). Historia Numorum: a Manual of Greek Numismatics (2nd ed.). London: Oxford.
- Marchetti, Patrick (1986). En guise d'épigraphie monétaire. La monetazione di Neapolis nella Campania antica, Atti del VII Convegno del Centro internazionale di studi numismatici, Napoli 1980. Rome: Istituto italiano di numismatica. pp. 443–478.
- Rutter, Keith N. (1997). Greek coinages of Southern Italy and Sicily. London: Spink. ISBN 0-907605-82-6.
- Rutter, Keith N. (2001). Historia Numorum - Italy. London: British Museum Press. ISBN 0-7141-1801-X.
- Sambon, Arthur (1966) [1903]. Les Monnaies antiques d'Italie (in French). Parigi: Forni. ISBN 978-88-271-0107-0.
- Sambon, Louis (1870). Recherches sur les monnaies de la presqu'ile italique. Napoli: l'Union.
- Margaret Thompson, Otto Mørkholm and Colin M. Kraay, ed. (1973). An Inventory of Greek Coin Hoards, commonly cited as IGCH. New York: ANS.
- Rudi Thomsen (1957–1961). Early Roman Coinage. A Study of the Chronology. Volume I-III. Copenaghen: København Nationalmuseet.
- Italo Vecchi; Bradbury Thurlow (1979). Italian Cast Coinage. Londra: V.C. Vecchi & Sons. ISBN 9780950683607.

=== Collections ===
- Joan E. Fisher, ed. (1969). SNG American Numismatic Society Part 1: Etruria-Calabria. New York: American Numismatic Society.
- Willy Schwabacher - Niels Breitenstin, ed. (1981). SNG Copenhagen, Vol. One: Italy, Sicily. Copenhagen: Danish National Museum.
- Anna Rita Parente, ed. (2003). SNG France, Vol. 6, Part 1: Italie (Étrurie-Calabre) (in French). Parigi: Bibliotèque Nationale de France / Numismatica Ars Classica.
