= Coinage of Suessa =

Coinage of Suessa, Italy

The coinage of Suessa concerns coins minted in Suessa, a city in ancient Campania (today's Sessa Aurunca) inhabited by the Aurunci, an ancient Italic population. The city minted coins in the period between 268 B.C. and the Second Punic War.

The coins of Suessa are part of those issued by colonies and allies of Rome in an area centered around ancient Campania; after the Second Punic War Suessa, like most of the centers of Roman Italy, no longer minted its own coins and adopted Roman coinage, centered on the denarius.

Numismatists traditionally treat Suessan coins as part of Greek coinage.

== Cataloging ==
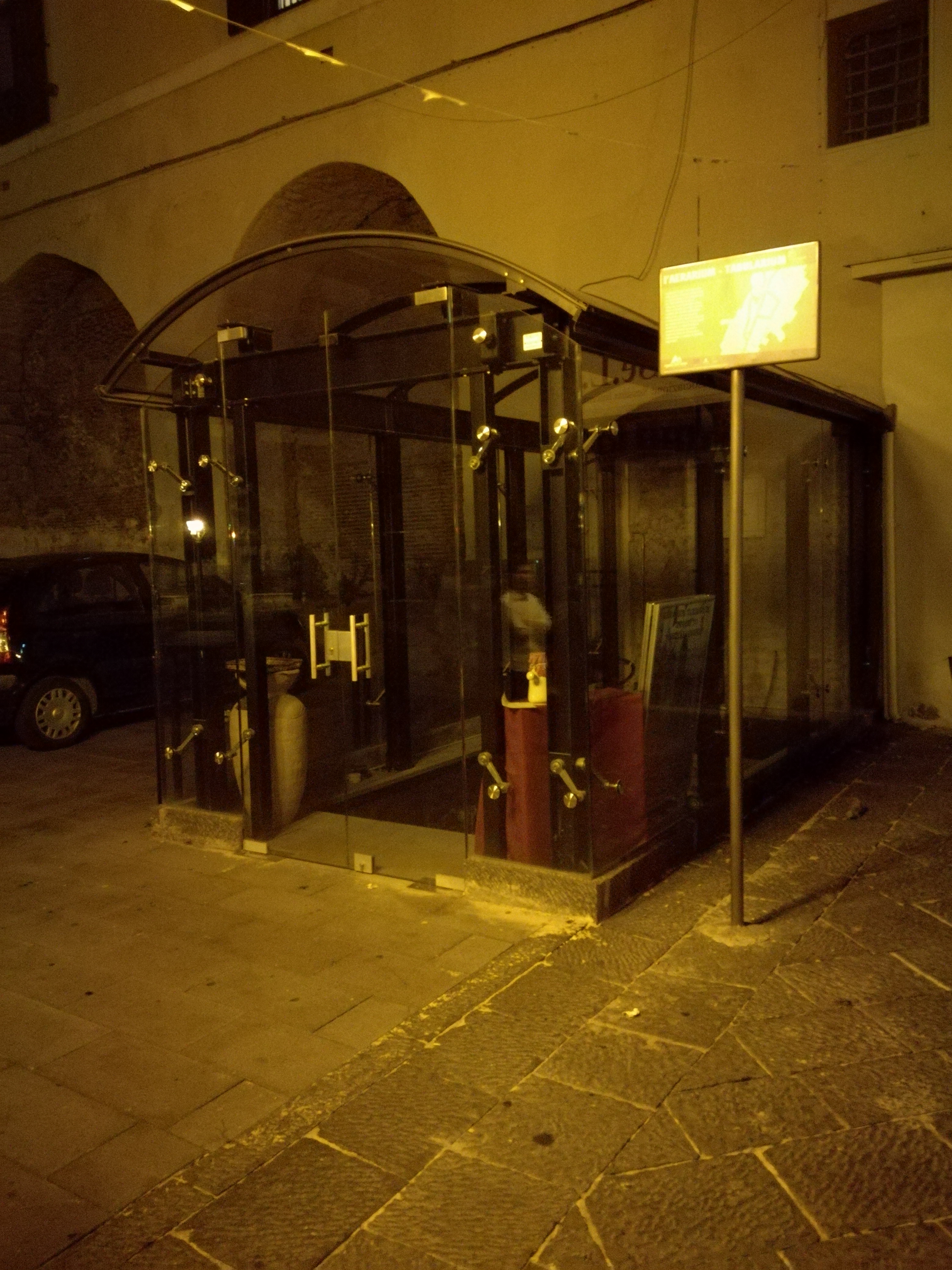
Entrance to the Tabularium-Aerarium of Suessa

No text specifically concerning the coinage of Suessa has been published. The work with the most extensive coverage is the one published by Arthur Sambon, a French scholar, entitled Les monnaies antiques de l'Italie, published in Paris in 1903. The book covers, despite its title, only part of ancient Italy: central Italy and Campania. The coins of Suessa are divided into four main groups, one for silvers (nº 852-869) and three for bronzes: the type with Mercury and Hercules (nº 870-872), the type with Minerva and the rooster (nº 873-876), and the type with Apollo and the man-headed bull (nº 877-884). In the catalogs there is a type reference "Sambon" followed by the number.

A less thorough but still comprehensive analysis is found in Historia Nummorum Italy, a text published in Britain in 2001 by a group of numismatists coordinated by Keith N. Rutter. This text differentiates only the main types. Catalogs include a type reference "HN" or "HN Italy" followed by the number: 447 for the silver didrachm with Apollo and the dioscurus, 448 for the bronze with Mercury and Hercules, 449 for Minerva and the rooster, and 450 for Apollo and the bull.

Other sources of cataloging are the Sylloge Nummorum Graecorum; generally the most recent or most widely available are used, such as that of the American Numismatic Society, Copenhagen, and France. For bronzes, the Sylloge of the Morcom Collection, a collection of bronzes from the Greek West located in Great Britain, is also used. In the catalogs there is an abbreviated Sylloge designation, such as "ANS," "Cop.", "Fran." or "Morcom" followed by the number of the coin depicted.

== Historical context ==
The territory of Suessa, in pre-Roman times populated by the Aurunci, came under the rule of Rome, which established a colony there under Latin law, in 313-312 BC.

Suessa minted coins from about 270 BC until the Second Punic War. In 209 B.C., during this very conflict, twelve colonies, including Cales, sent legates to Rome, where they refused to give the aid that had been requested of them according to the formula togatorum. When the war was over, Rome profoundly reduced its previous autonomy, and among the autonomies lost was the right of coinage.

== Monetary context ==
Monetary context
Location of the centers

In the period between the First and Second Punic Wars, new coins with similar characteristics appeared in a group of cities linked to Rome. These were bronze coins presenting two types:

- one shows on the obverse the head of Apollo turned to the left and on the reverse a man-headed bull, i.e., a bull with a human face, passing to the right and with its head in front, identical to the one already in use in the coinage of Neapolis;
- the other shows Minerva's head with a Corinthian helmet on the obverse and a standing rooster on the reverse. These coins are similar in style to Roman coins of the same period.

Some of these cities exclusively minted coins with Apollo, others only those with Minerva, and others both; in addition to the types mentioned, some of them also minted didrachms of Campanian foot and other bronze coins with different types. The cities were all located in Latium adiectum, Campania, and the Volturno basin.

Mint	Apollo	Minerva	Didrachm	Other bronze
Aesernia	× (S. 175-182)			× (S. 183 / 184-189)
Aquinum		× (S. 166-170)		
Caiatia		× (S. 974-976)		
Cales	× (S. 919-967)	× (S. 916-918)	× (S. 885-915)	
Compulteria	× (S. 1066-73)			
Suessa	× (S. 877-884)	× (S. 873)	× (S. 852-869)	× (S. 870-872)
Teanum Sidicinum	× (S. 989-1002)	× (S. 1004)	× (S. 977-988)	× (S. 1003)
Telesia		× (S. 174)		
Cataloging according to Sambon, 1903, in parentheses

The cities share not only types but also coins and some identifying marks, such as the recurring acronym ΙΣ. The symbols used to distinguish individual issues also tend to overlap, at least for cities with a more conspicuous number of issues. The symbols used also largely overlap with those of the coeval coins of Neapolis and Rome.

These coincidences, together with the simultaneous presence of coins from these cities, in the treasures that have come down to us, alongside those from Neapolis and Rome, stylistic congruities and other elements, have led scholars to speculate on some form of common circulation and the existence of a supra-civic authority to control coinage.

== Coins ==
The coins of Suessa are closely related to those of other cities in the area in style, types, and production techniques; silver coins with the types of Apollo on the obverse and Dioscurus on the reverse and bronze coins with three different types were minted in the city of Aurunci.

Stater
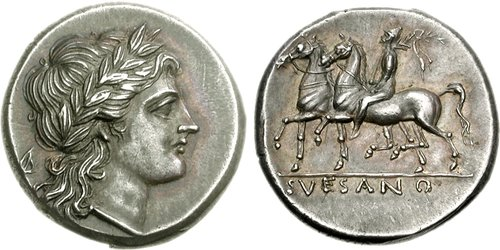
First side of the image: Laureate head of Apollo facing right; symbol behind (spearhead)
Second side of the image: Dioscurus, riding towards the left, accompanied by a second horse. In the exergue SVESANO.
AR Nomos (7.23 g, 5h).
Sambon 863, HN Italy 447

=== Silver ===
Suessa was one of the Campanian cities of the third century B.C. that minted their own silver coinage, a stater (or didrachm) of Campanian foot, weighing about 7.5 grams and divided into two drachmas. This foot was used throughout the Campanian coast, from Velia and Poseidonia in the south to Cumae and Neapolis in the north. In that same century the foot was used by the Latin colonies and other socii of Rome, which began minting at that time and decided to mint silver coins as well.

The obverse depicted the head of Apollo with a laurel wreath; the head could be turned to the right (Sambon 852-867 bis) or to the left (Sambon 868-869). Behind is a variable symbol. Sambon lists several of them: lyre, triskelion, crescent, tip of trident, sword, pentagon, shield, Phrygian helmet, owl, lion's snout, tripod, spearhead (or leaf), trophy, thunderbolt, eight-rayed star, wing, shell (of pecten), two-handled vase (or cantharus), helmet. According to Head the obverse is apparently copied from the Croton staters of the 4th century BCE.

The reverse depicted a dioscurus on a horse in a walking pose, both facing left. The dioscurus holds in his right hand a palm frond on a knotted ribbon; the frond rests on his right shoulder. Beside, in the background, there is another horse without a rider. The exergue bears the demonym SVESANO. As for the reverse, the variations concern the quality of the engraving and the style of the legends.

=== Bronze ===
Three main groups of bronze coins were minted in Suessa: the one with Minerva/Gallus, the one with Apollo/man-headed bull, and the one with Mercury's head on the obverse and Hercules strangling the lion on the reverse. The first two types are in common with many other cities in the area. The last type, with the head of Mercury (or Hermes) on the obverse and Hercules (or Heracles) on the reverse, is specific to Suessa.

Mercury / Hercules
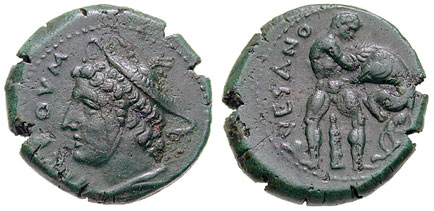
First side of the image: PRBOVM, Mercury's head turned to the left, with winged petasus.
Second side of the image: On the left SVESANO; Hercules standing, fighting with the Nemean lion, a club between his legs.
Æ HN Italy 448; Sambon 870

==== Mercury ====
The obverse depicts the head of Mercury recognizable by the petasus, the headdress that characterizes the god. The type with Mercury's head was quite common in Italic and Italiotic coinage; it is present on the sextans of Roman coinage, in the coinage of the Frentani, and in that of Populonia. The style is that of the central Italian tradition.

In front is a legend, ΠROBOM, written with some variations. The meaning is unclear. The term probus at the time meant "valid." Sambon hypothesizes a "probum aes" or "probum metallum." A similar legend (ΠROΠOM) is found in bronze from Beneventum.

The reverse depicts Hercules standing, almost face-on, stifling the Nemean lion. Below, between his legs, is a club. On the left is the demonym SVESANO. The type recalls various Greek coins, notably the reverse of some staters from Heraclea, a polis in Lucania; it is also depicted on the reverse of a Roman serratus denarius minted in the name of C. Publicius, Q. f., around 80 BCE.

==== Minerva ====
The group of coins with the type of Minerva and the rooster is one of three groups in the bronze coinage of Suessa. Sambon identifies four series with the type of Pallas on the obverse and a rooster on the reverse; the series are those numbered 873, 874, 875, and 876. The head of the goddess, depicted on the obverse, is turned to the left and wears a Corinthian helmet with a long hackle. This side of the coin is completed by a circle of dots. The helmet is worn on the nape of the neck, leaving the face uncovered.

The type depicted on the obverse is similar to that of the quincunx from Larinum and Luceria as well as other coins including Roman litra. Variations in this group concern the obverse and are determined by stylistic variability.

The type with Minerva and rooster is also found in several other cities in the area.

Apollo / bull - Nike
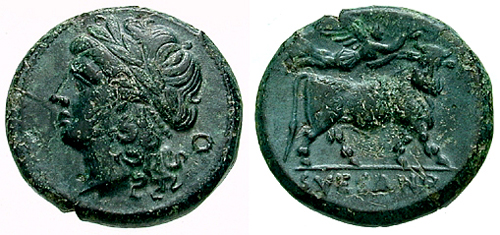
Æ 5.92 g; Sambon 884; Rutter, HN 450.

==== Apollo ====
The third group of bronze coins features on the obverse the head of Apollo, turned to the left, encircled by a laurel wreath; behind the head is a symbol (lightning) or a Greek letter (Κ, Μ, Ν or Ο).

The reverse depicts a man-headed bull, that is, a bull with a human face. The bull is passing to the right and the head is face-on. This creature represents the god Achelous or more generally a river deity. Coeval coins from Neapolis show the same type, with Apollo on the obverse and the bull on the reverse. A Nike crowns the bull. Between the bull's legs is a Greek letter, symbol (pentagram) or the sequence ΙΣ.

The type of the man-headed bull crowned by Nike is present in the coinage of Neapolis as early as the fifth century BCE, and also in the coinage of many other centers in the area.

Sambon identifies eight main variants (877-884), according to the symbols-letters and according to the position of the demonym (obverse or reverse).

Sambon	Symbol on the obverse	Symbol on the reverse	Position of the demonym	Notes
877	lightning	Ν	obverse	
878	Κ	ΙΣ	obverse	
879	Μ	Π	obverse	The spelling of the 'Π' letter used is
880	Μ	Μ	obverse	
881	Ν	Μ or Ν or Π or ΙΣ	obverse	The spelling of the 'Π' letter used is
882	Ο	pentagram	obverse	
883	Τ	ΙΣ	obverse	
884	Ο (or patera)	–	reverse	
N.B. the sequence ΙΣ (iota-sigma) is present in many of the coins of the area. The meaning is unclear.

== Findings ==
Thompson et al. (in IGCH) report six treasure finds.

IGCH	Location	Date found	Burial date (BC)	Quantity of Suessan coins and metal	Other coins
1986	Pietrabbondante	1899	265-60	16 Æ	17 aes grave and 162 Æ Romano-Campanian and Campanian
1995	Morino	c. 1830	240-30	"many" Æ	"many" Æ Romano-Campanian and Campanian
2005	Italia	1862	230 circa	2	Æ "some" Romano-Campanian and "many" Campanian
2015	Canosa di Puglia	1911 (?)	220	4 staters	5 Greek staters and 119 Roman silver (2 quadrigates and 117 victoriates)
2031	Cava dei Tirreni	1907	late 3rd century	1 Æ	72 Æ, 50 aes grave and Roman minted.
2058	Strongoli	1889	1st century (?)	1 Æ (Minerva / rooster)	1 electrum of Syracuse, 1 denarius of the Social War, 5 republican denarii and 3 bronzes of Petelia.

Based on the findings, the area of diffusion, apart from the dubious Strongoli treasure, is central Italy.

== Legends and epigraphy ==
The legends in the coinage of Suessa are the demonym and the word PROBOM. In some coins there is the abbreviation ΙΣ.

The demonym SVESANO uses the letter "V," since there was no differentiation between the letters "u" and "v" at that time. There are some variations in the style of the letter "S," which is sometimes written as.

The legend ΠROBOM found on the Mercury/Hercules bronze has the letter Π with a shorter right vertical bar,. The spelling varies: ΠRBOVM, ΠRBOM, etc. The spelling ΠROBVM, not mentioned by Sambon, is present in the Paris collection.

== Weights and alloys ==
There are no specific studies on the quality of the metal used. As a rule, however, in the period the silver alloy was the best that could be obtained with the procedures of the time. The foot used is the same as in the coinage of Neapolis and other coeval coinage in the area, the so-called Campanian or Phocaean foot, with a stater having a theoretical weight of 7.5 grams, divided into two drachms.

Data from the most recent SNGs are given.

Catalogue	Specimen	Minimum weight	Maximum weight	Average weight	Notes
ANS	5 (594-598)	6,71	7,12	6,89	
Copenhagen	3 (579-581)	6,57	7,02	6,79	
France	10 (1146-1155)	6,82	7,21	7,08	Specimens 1149 and 1152 are plated. The 1151 has a minting error: on the reverse side there is the impression of the obverse in incuse.
N.B. The average weights do not include plated coins.

== See also ==
- Aurunci
- Sessa Aurunca

== Bibliography ==
=== Primary sources ===
- Livy, Ab urbe condita libri
- Velleius Paterculus, Historiae Romanae ad M. Vinicium consulem libri duo

=== Numismatic literature ===
- Head, Barclay Vincent (1911). Historia Numorum: a Manual of Greek Numismatics (2nd ed.). London: Oxford.
- Boutin, Serge (1979). Catalogue des monnaies Grecques antiques de l'ancienne collection Pozzi. Monnaies frappées en Europe. Maastricht.
- Grose, Sidney William (1923). The Fitzwilliam Museum: Catalogue of the Mc Clean Collection of Greek Coins. vol. I: Italy and Sicily. Cambridge.
- Rutter, Keith N. (1997). Greek coinages of Southern Italy and Sicily. London: Spink. ISBN 0-907605-82-6.
- Rutter, Keith N.; et al. (et al.) (2001). Historia Nummorum - Italy. London: British Museum Press. ISBN 0-7141-1801-X.
- Sambon, Arthur (1903). Les Monnaies antiques d'Italie (in French). Parigi. ristampa Forni: ISBN 978-88-271-0107-0.
- Sambon, Louis (1870). Recherches sur les monnaies de la presqu'ile italique. Napoli.
- Margaret Thompson, Otto Mørkholm e Colin Kraay, ed. (1973). An Inventory of Greek Coin Hoards, comunemente citato come IGCH. New York: ANS.

=== Collections ===
- Joan E. Fisher, ed. (1969). SNG American Numismatic Society Part 1: Etruria-Calabria. New York: American Numismatic Society.
- Willy Schwabacher - Niels Breitenstin, ed. (1981). SNG Copenaghen, Vol. One: Italy, Sicily. Copenaghen: Danish National Museum.
- Anna Rita Parente, ed. (2003). SNG France, Vol. 6, Part 1: Italie (Étrurie-Calabre) (in French). Parigi: Bibliotèque Nationale de France / Numismatica Ars Classica.
