= Ala (Roman allied military unit) =

4th-1st century BC unit of the republic

An ala (Latin for "wing"; pl. alae) was the term used during the middle of the Roman Republic (338–88 BC) to denote a military formation composed of conscripts from the socii, Rome's Italian military allies. A normal consular army during the period consisted of two legions, composed of only Roman citizens, and two allied alae.

The alae were somewhat larger than normal legions, 5,400 or 5,100 men against the legion's 4,500 men, and it contained a greater quantity of cavalry, usually 900 horsemen against the 300 supplied by the Romans.

From the time of the first Roman emperor, Augustus (ruled 27 BC – AD 14), the term ala was used in the professional imperial army to denote a much smaller (c. 500), purely cavalry unit of the non-citizen auxilia corps: see ala (Roman cavalry unit).

== History ==
When the Roman armies started being composed partly of Roman citizens and partly of socii (allies from the rest of the Italian mainland), either Latini or Italici, it became the practice to marshal the Roman troops in the centre of the battle line and the socii upon the wings. Consular armies of the mid-Republic would consist of two legions of Roman citizens and two legions of "ala", with the ala supplying thirty turmae of cavalry per legion, whereas the Roman provided only ten turmae. Hence ala and alarii denoted the contingent furnished by the allies, both horse and foot, and the two divisions were distinguished as dextera ala (right wing) and sinistra ala (left wing).

As late as Polybius' times, contingents of allies forming the alae were recruited by their own leaders in their homelands, which were expected to levy an equivalent number to the Roman troops; the specifications of those agreements were covered in the formula togatorum. They were managed by six Roman officers called praefecti sociorum, equivalent to the legion's six military tribunes, who were chosen from the equestrian order by the consul at charge However, Rome would also trust on their allied commander themselves, with outstanding examples like the Frentani Oblacus Volsinius or the Campanian Decius Vibellius during the Pyrrhic War.

Socii were expected to fight in the same manner and equipment as the Roman troops and provide their own basic rations, and were in turn would receive a percentage of any loot gained, although at a lower rate than their Roman equivalents.
