= Colin M. Kraay =

British numismatist (1918–1982)

Colin Mackennal Kraay, FBA, FSA (23 March 1918 – 27 January 1982) was an English numismatist. He was the Keeper of the Heberden Coin Room at the Ashmolean Museum from 1975 to his death in 1982.

== Career ==
Kraay was born on 23 March 1918. He was the son of Caspar Alexander Kraay, a rubber merchant of Dutch extraction, and Henrietta Agnes, daughter of the sculptor Edgar Bertram Mackennal. His mother had a deep interest in classical art and designed the effigy of George V which appeared in British coins. Kraay was educated at Lancing College (where an early interest in archaeology blossomed) before going up to Magdalen College, Oxford, as an exhibitioner to read classics. In 1939, he attended excavations at Mycenae. War service from 1940 to 1945 interrupted his studies. In 1946, he returned to Oxford and the following year graduated with a BA. He had by this time nurtured a growing interest in the coinage of ancient Rome and in 1948 won the Barclay Head Prize for Ancient Numismatics and in 1951 the Conington Prize while completing a doctorate, which was awarded in 1953.

Kraay was a part-time assistant keeper at the Ashmolean Museum from 1948 and a lecturer in ancient history at Wadham College, Oxford, and at Keble College, Oxford. In 1952, he was appointed a full assistant keeper at the Ashmolean, working in its Heberden Coin Room. He was also appointed the university lecturer in Greek numismatics in 1959. He became a senior assistant keeper at the museum in 1962; in 1975, he was promoted to be the Keeper of the Coin Room. He had also been elected to a fellowship at Wolfson College, Oxford, in 1965. Kraay collaborated on the Inventory of Greek Coin Hoards (1973), wrote Archaic and Classical Greek Coins (1976) and contributed to the Sylloge Nummorum Graecorum. He served as the president of the Royal Numismatic Society from 1970 to 1974 and the Centre Internazionale di Studi Numismatici from 1974 to 1979. In 1978, he was elected a fellow of the British Academy.

Kraay died on 27 January 1982, while still in his post at the Ashmolean and on the fellowship at Wolfson College. He left a widow, Margaret, née Prince, and their son.
