= Cales =

Ancient city of Campania

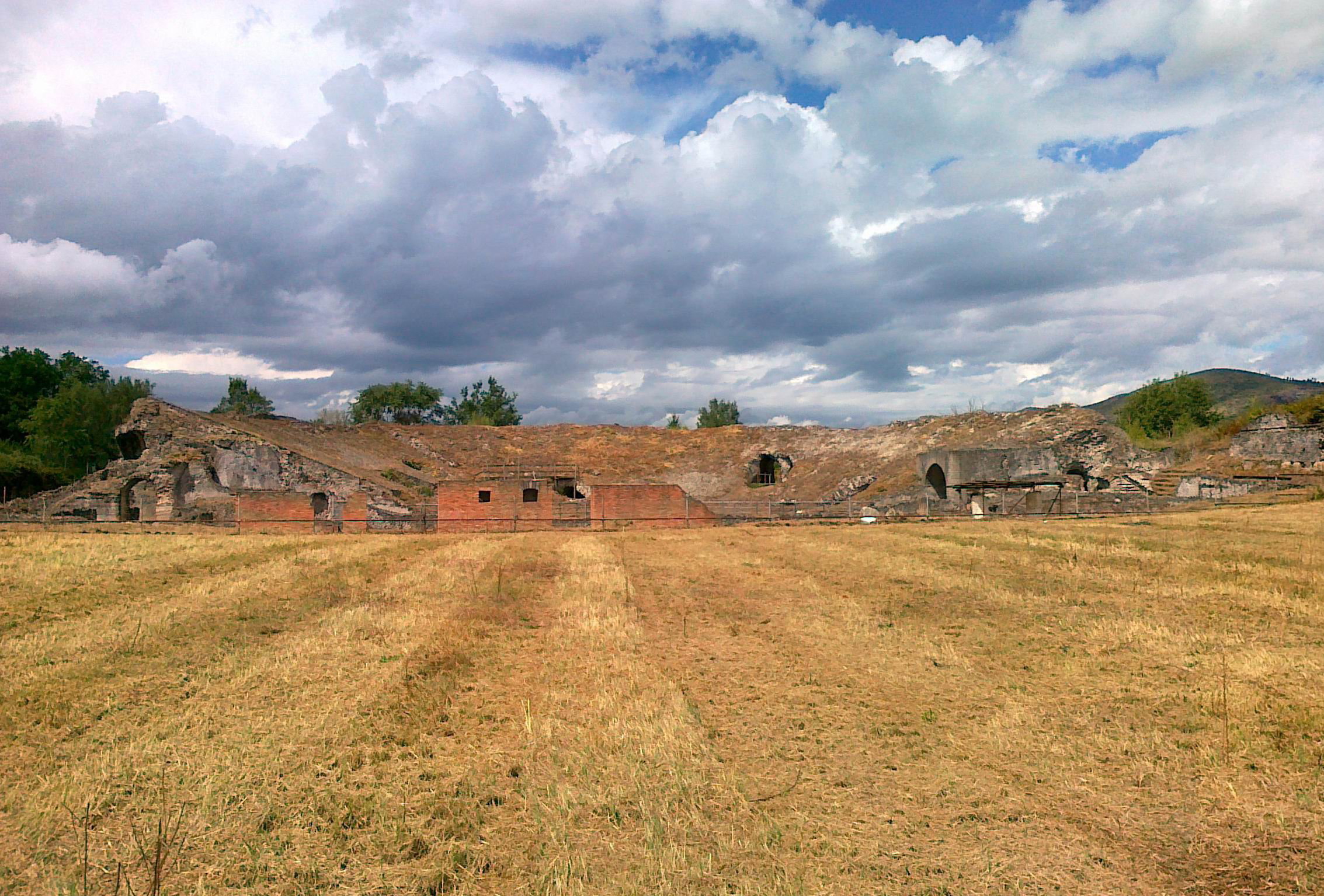
- Roman Theatre of Cales
- Interactive map of Cales
- 41°12′0″N 14°7′55.2″E
- Type: Settlement
- Location: Calvi Risorta, Province of Caserta, Italy
- Region: Campania

Site notes
- Management: Soprintendenza per i beni archeologici di Salerno, Avellino e Caserta
- Public access: Yes
- Website: Sito Archeologico di Cales (in Italian)

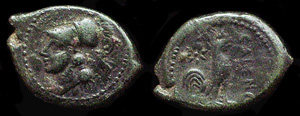
3rd century BC coin from Cales

Cales was an ancient city of Campania, in today's comune of Calvi Risorta in southern Italy, belonging originally to the Aurunci/Ausoni, on the Via Latina.

The Romans captured it in 335 BC and established a colony with Latin rights of 2,500 citizens. Cales was initially the centre of the Roman dominion in Campania. To the period after 335 belong numerous silver and bronze coins with the inscription Caleno. It was an important base in the war against Hannibal, and at last refused further contributions for the war. Before 184 BC more settlers were sent there. After the Social War it became a municipium. The fertility of its territory and its manufacture of black glazed pottery, which was even exported to Etruria, made it prosperous. At the end of the 3rd century BC it appears as a colony, and in the 5th century (AD) it became an episcopal see, which (jointly with Teano since 1818) it still is, though it is now a mere village. The cathedral of Cales, of the 12th century, has a carved portal and three apses decorated with small arches and pilasters, and contains a fine pulpit and episcopal throne in marble mosaic. Near it are two grottos, which have been used for Christian worship and contain frescoes of the 10th and 11th centuries. Inscriptions name six gates of the town: and there are considerable remains of antiquity, especially of an amphitheatre and theatre, of a supposed temple, and other edifices.

A number of tombs belonging to the Roman necropolis were discovered in 1883.

== See also ==
- Aurunca, another city of the Ausones/Aurunci
- Ausona (ancient city), another city of the Ausones/Aurunci
- Coinage of Cales
