= Socii =

Confederates of Roman Republic

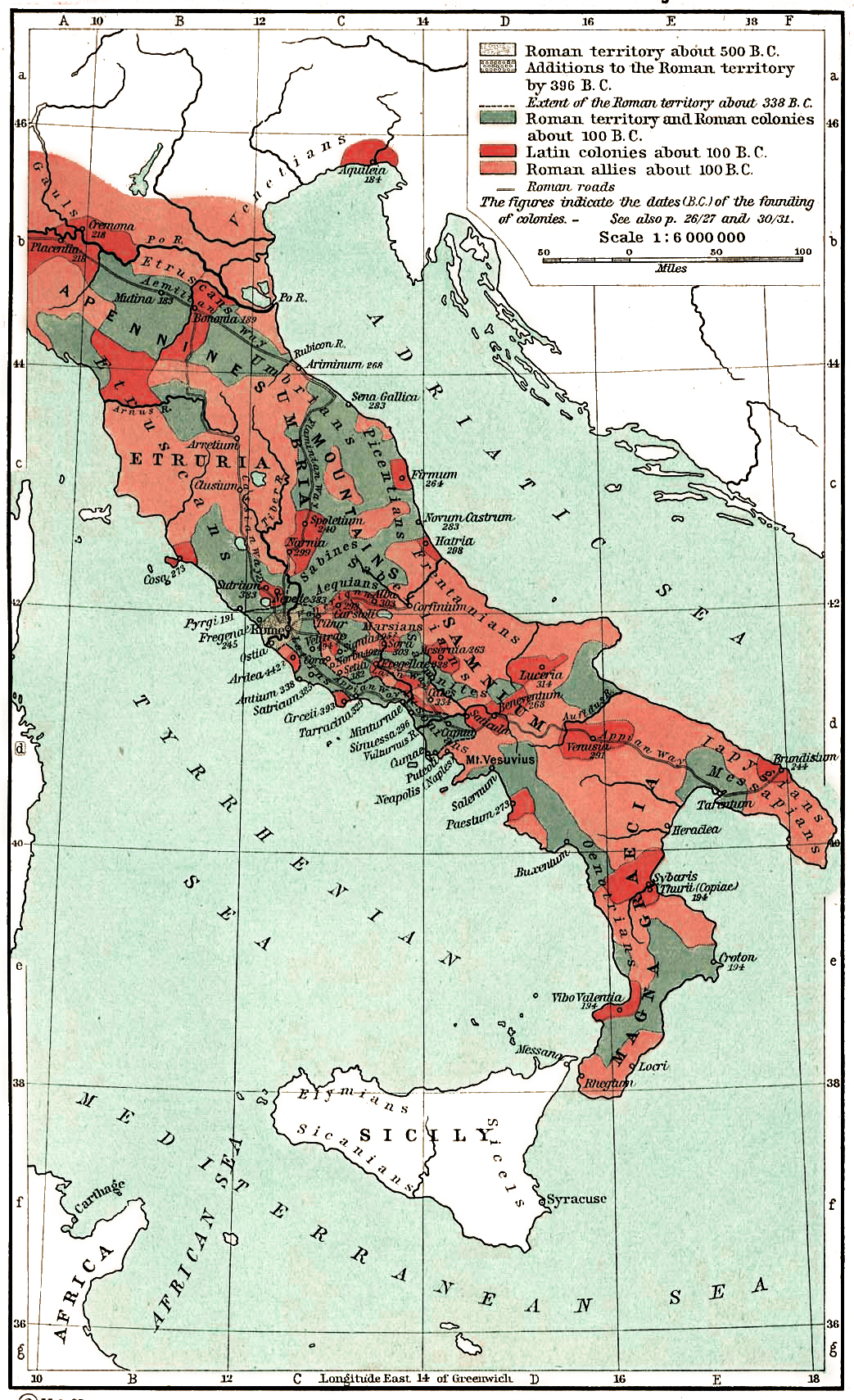
Roman Italy around 100 BC. Roman Cives in green, Latini in red, Socii in orange.

The socii (English: /ˈsoʊʃiaɪ/ SOH-shee-eye) or foederati (English: /ˌfɛdəˈreɪtaɪ/ FED-ə-RAY-ty) were protectorates of Rome and the citizens thereof; they formed one of the three types of civic community in Roman Italy (Italia) along with the core Roman citizens (Cives Romani) and the extended Latini. The Latini, who were simultaneously special confederates (Socii Latini) and semi-citizens (Cives Latini), derived their name from the Italic people of which Rome was part (the Latins) but did not coincide with the region of Latium in central Italy as they were located in colonies throughout the peninsula. This tripartite organisation lasted from the Roman expansion in Italy (509–264 BC) to the Social War (91–87 BC), when all peninsular inhabitants south of the Po river were awarded Roman citizenship.

Treaties known as foedera served as the basic template for Rome's settlement with the large array of tribes and city-states of the whole Italian Peninsula. The confederacy had its origin in the foedus Cassianum ("Treaty of Cassius", 493 BC) signed by the fledgling Roman Republic with its neighbouring Latin city-states shortly after the overthrow of the Roman monarchy in 510 BC. This provided for mutual defence by the two parties on the basis of an equal contribution to the annual military levy, which was probably under Roman overall command. The terms of the treaty were probably more acceptable to the Latins than the previous type of Roman hegemony, that of the Tarquin kings, as the latter had probably required the payment of tribute and not a simple military obligation.

In the fourth century BC, the original Latins were mostly granted Roman citizenship. But the terms of the foedus was extended to about 150 other tribes and city-states. When a state was defeated, a part of its territory would be annexed by Rome to provide land for Roman/Latin colonists. The latter, although Roman citizens, were required to give up their citizen rights on joining a colony, and accept the status of socii. This was in order that Latin colonies could act as "watchdogs" on the other socii in the allied military formations, the alae. The defeated state would be allowed to keep the rest of its territory in return for binding itself to Rome with an unequal foedus, one that would forge a state of perpetual military alliance with the Roman Republic. This would require the ally to "have the same friends and enemies as Rome", effectively prohibiting war against other socii and surrendering foreign policy to Rome; such a state retained its internal self-government but became in essence a protectorate. Beyond this, the central, and in most cases sole, obligation on the ally was to contribute to the confederate army, on demand, a number of fully equipped troops up to a specified maximum each year, to serve under Roman command.

The Roman confederation had fully evolved by 264 BC and remained for 200 years the basis of the Roman military structure. From 338 to 88 BC, Roman legions were invariably accompanied on campaign by roughly the same numbers of confederated troops organised into two units called alae (literally "wings", as confederated troops would always be posted on the flanks of the Roman battle-line, with the Roman legions holding the centre). 75% of a normal consular army's cavalry was supplied by the Italian socii. Although the socii provided around half the levies raised by Rome in any given year, they had no say in how those troops were used. Foreign policy and war were matters exclusively in the hands of the Roman consuls and the Roman Senate.

Despite the loss of independence and heavy military obligations, the system provided notable benefits for the socii. Most importantly, they were freed from the constant threat of aggression from their neighbours that had existed in the centuries prior to the imposition of this confederation. In addition, the Roman alliance protected the Italian peninsula from external invasion, such as the periodic and devastating incursions of Gauls from the Po Valley. Although no longer in control of war and foreign policy, each socius remained otherwise fully autonomous, with its own laws, system of government, coinage and language. Moreover, the military burden was only half that shouldered by Roman citizens, as the latter numbered only about half the population of the socii, but provided around half the total levies. Despite this, allied troops were allowed to share war booty on a 50–50 basis with Romans.

The relationship between Rome and the Latin cities remained ambivalent, and many socii rebelled against the alliance whenever the opportunity arose. The best opportunities were provided by the invasion of Italy by the Greek king Pyrrhus from 281 to 275 BC, and by the invasion of Italy by Carthaginian general Hannibal from 218 to 203 BC. During these invasions, many socii joined the invaders, mostly Oscan-speakers of southern Italy, most prominently the Samnite tribes, who were Rome's most implacable enemy. At the same time, however, many socii remained loyal, motivated primarily by antagonisms with neighbouring rebels. Even after Rome's disaster at the Battle of Cannae (216 BC), over half the socii (by population) did not defect and Rome's military alliance was ultimately victorious.

In the century following the Second Punic War, Italy was rarely threatened by external invasion (save by the occasional Gallic or Germanic horde) and Rome and her allies embarked on aggressive expansion overseas, in Spain, Africa and the Balkans. Despite the fact that the alliance was no longer acting defensively, there was virtually no protest from the socii, most likely because the latter benefited equally in the enormous amounts of war booty yielded by these campaigns.

But, beneath the surface, resentment was building among the socii about their second-class status as peregrini i.e. non-citizens (except for the Latin colonists, who could regain their citizenship by moving to Roman territory). The Roman military confederation now became a victim of its own success in forging a united nation out of the patchwork of ethnicities and states. The socii rebelled en masse, including many that had remained steadfast in the past, launching the Social War. But, unlike on previous occasions, their aim was to join the Roman state as equal citizens, not to secede from it. Although the socii were defeated on the battlefield, they gained their main demand. By the end of the war in 87 BC, all inhabitants of peninsular Italy had been granted the right to apply for Roman citizenship.

== Meanings of the term "Latin" ==
The Romans themselves used the term "Latin" loosely, and this can be confusing. The term was used to describe what were actually three distinct groups:

1. The Latin tribe strictly speaking, to which the Romans themselves belonged. These were the inhabitants of Latium Vetus ("Old Latium"), a small region south of the river Tiber, whose inhabitants were speakers of the Latin language.
2. The inhabitants of Latin colonies. These were coloniae made up of mixed Roman/Latin colonists.
3. All the Italian allies of Rome, not only the Latin colonies, but also the other non-Latin allies (socii).

In this article, to avoid confusion, only group (1) will be referred to as "Latins". Group (2) will be called "Latin colonies or colonists" and group (3) will be referred to as "Italian confederates". Socii will refer to groups (2) and (3) combined.

== Ethnic composition of ancient Italy ==
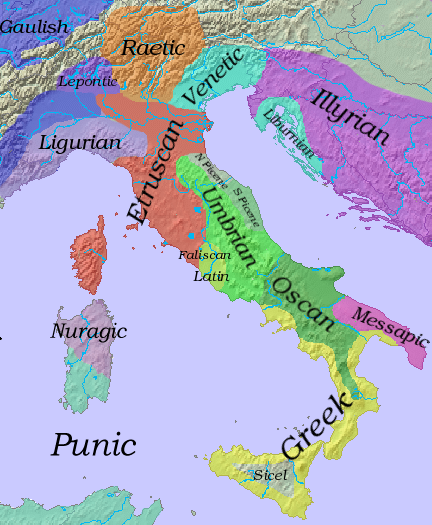
Linguistic map of Italy in the sixth century BC. Gallic tribes (in dark blue) had already colonised the region of Piedmont. By 400 BC, they had overrun much of the rest of the Po plain in the North, and Gaulish dialects had displaced Lepontic, Raetic, Etruscan and N. Picene in that region. Raetic survived in the Alps. Note the tiny area occupied by the original Latins

The Italian peninsula at this time was a patchwork of different ethnic groups, languages and cultures. These may be divided into the following broad nations:

1. The Italic tribes, that dominated central and southern Italy, as well as northeastern Italy. These included the original Latins and a large number of other tribes, most notably the Samnites (actually a league of tribes) who dominated south central Italy. In addition to Latin, these tribes spoke Umbrian and Oscan dialects, all closely related Indo-European languages. The Italic tribes were mostly tough hill-dwelling pastoralists, who made superb infantrymen, especially the Samnites. It is believed that the latter invented the manipular infantry formation and the use of javelins and oblong shields, which were adopted by the Romans at the end of the Samnite Wars. An isolated Italic group were the Veneti in the northeast. They gave their name to the region they inhabited, Venetia, a name chosen centuries afterwards for the new founded capital of the allied people of the Venetian Lagoon, who would become the Republic of Venice.
2. The Greeks, who had colonised the coastal areas of southern Italy from c. 700 BC onwards, which was known to the Romans as Magna Graecia ("Greater Greece") for that reason. The Greek colonies had the most advanced civilisation in the Italian peninsula, much of which was adopted by the Romans. Their language, although Indo-European, was quite different from Latin. As maritime cities, the Greeks' primary military significance was naval. They invented the best warship of the ancient world, the trireme. Some of the original Greek colonies (such as Capua and Cumae) had been subjugated by the neighbouring Italic tribes and become Oscan-speaking in the period up to 264 BC. The surviving Greek cities in 264 were all coastal: Neapolis, Poseidonia (Paestum), Velia, Rhegium, Locri, Croton, Thurii, Heraclea, Metapontum and Tarentum. The most populous were Neapolis, Rhegium and Tarentum, all of which had large, strategic harbours on the Tyrrhenian, the Strait of Messina and the Ionian Sea respectively. Tarentum had, until c. 300 BC, been a major power and hegemon (leading power) of the Italiote league, a confederation of the Greek cities in Italy. But its military capability was crippled by the Romans, who defeated Tarentum by 272 BC.
3. The Etruscans, who dominated the region between the rivers Arno and Tiber, still retaining a derived name (Tuscany) today. The Etruscans spoke a non Indo-European language which today is largely unknown, and had a distinctive culture. Some scholars believe Rome may have been an Etruscan city at the time of the Roman kings (conventionally 753–509 BC). The Etruscans had originally dominated the Po Valley, but had been progressively displaced from this region by the Gauls in the 4th century BC, separating them the Etruscan-speaking Raetians in the Alpine region.
4. The Campanians, occupying the fertile plain between the river Volturno and the bay of Naples. These were not a distinct ethnic group, but a mixed Samnite/Opician population with Etruscan elements. The Samnites had conquered the Greek and Etruscan city-states in the period 450–400 BC. Speaking the Oscan language, they developed a distinctive culture and identity. Although partly of Samnite blood, they came to regard the mountain Samnites that surrounded them as a major threat, leading them to ask for Roman protection from 340 BC onwards. As plains-dwellers, horses played an important role for the Campanians and their cavalry was considered the best in the peninsula. Their main city was Capua, probably the second-largest city in Italy at this time. Other important cities were Nola, Acerrae, Suessula
5. The Gauls, who had migrated into, and colonised, the plain of the Po river (pianura padana) from c. 390 BC onwards. This region is now part of northern Italy, but until the rule of Augustus was not regarded as part of Italy at all, but part of Gaul. The Romans called it Cisalpine Gaul ("Gaul this side of the Alps"). They spoke Gaulish dialects, part of the Celtic group of Indo-European languages. Tribal-based territories with some city-like centres.
6. The Ligurians, occupying the region known to the Romans (and still called today) as Liguria, southwest of the Gauls. It is unclear whether their language was non Indo-European (related to Iberian), Italic, or Celtic (related to Gaulish). Most likely, they spoke a Celto-Italic hybrid language.
7. The Messapii, who occupied the southern part of the Apulian peninsula in SE Italy, are believed from inscriptions to be speakers of a tongue related to Illyrian (an Indo-European language). They were in perpetual conflict over territory with the Greeks of Tarentum.

== Background: early Rome (to 338 BC) ==
Ancient historians' accounts of the history of Rome before it was destroyed by the Gauls in 390 BC are regarded as highly unreliable by modern historians. Livy, the main surviving ancient source on the early period, himself admits that the earlier period is very obscure and that his own account is based on legend rather than written documentation, as the few written documents that did exist in the earlier period were mostly lost in the Gallic sack. There is a tendency among ancient authors to create anachronisms. For example, Rome's so-called "Servian Wall" was attributed to the legendary king Servius Tullius in c. 550 BC, but archaeology and a note in Livy himself show that the wall was built after the sack of Rome by the Gauls. Servius Tullius was also credited with the centuriate organisation of the Roman citizen body which again scholars agree cannot have been established by Servius in the form described by Livy in book I.43. His centuriae were supposedly designed to organise the military levy, but would have resulted in the majority of the total levy being raised from the two top property classes, which were also the smallest numerically, a result that is clearly nonsensical. Instead, the reform must date from much later, certainly after 400 BC and probably after 300. (Indeed, it has even been suggested that the centuriate organisation was not introduced before the Second Punic War and the currency reform of 211 BC. The sextantal as, the denomination used by Livy to define the centuriate property thresholds, did not exist until then. But this argument is regarded as weak by some historians, as Livy may simply have converted older values). Despite this, the broad trends of early Roman history as related by the ancient authors are reasonably accurate.

According to Roman legend, Rome was founded by Romulus in 753 BC. However, the vast amount of archaeological evidence uncovered since the 1970s suggests that Rome did not assume the characteristics of a united city-state (as opposed to a group of separate hilltop settlements) before around 625. The same evidence, however, has also conclusively discredited A. Alfoldi's once-fashionable theory that Rome was an insignificant settlement until c. 500 (and that, consequently, the Republic was not established before c. 450). There is now no doubt that Rome was a major city in the period from 625 to 500 BC, when it had an area of c. 285 hectares and an estimated population of 35,000. This made it the second-largest in Italy (after Tarentum) and about half the size of contemporary Athens (585 hectares, inc. Piraeus). Also, few scholars today dispute that Rome was ruled by kings in its archaic period, although whether any of the seven names of kings preserved by tradition are historical remains uncertain (Romulus himself is generally regarded as mythical). It is also likely that there were several more kings than those preserved by tradition, given the long duration of the regal era (even if it did start in 625 rather than 753).

The Roman monarchy, although an autocracy, did not resemble a medieval monarchy. It was not hereditary and based on "divine right", but elective and subject to the ultimate sovereignty of the people. The king (rex, from root-verb regere, literally means simply "ruler") was elected for life by the people's assembly (the comitia curiata originally), although there is strong evidence that the process was in practice controlled by the patricians, a hereditary aristocratic caste. Most kings were non-Romans brought in from abroad, doubtless as a neutral figure who could be seen as above patrician factions. Although blood relations could succeed, they were still required to submit to election. The position and powers of a Roman king were thus similar to those of Julius Caesar when he was appointed dictator in perpetuity in 44 BC, and indeed of the Roman emperors.

According to Roman tradition, in 616 BC, an Etruscan named Lucumo from the town of Tarquinii, was elected king of Rome as Lucius Tarquinius Priscus. He was succeeded by his son-in-law, Servius Tullius, and then by his son, Lucius Tarquinius Superbus. The establishment of this Etruscan "dynasty" has led some dated historians to claim that late regal Rome was occupied by troops from Tarquinii militarily and culturally Etruscanised. But this theory has been dismissed as a myth by Cornell and other more modern historians, who point to the extensive evidence that Rome remained politically independent, as well as linguistically and culturally a Latin city. In relation to the army, the Cornell faction argue that the introduction of heavy infantry in the late regal era followed Greek, not Etruscan, models.

In addition, it seems certain that the kings were overthrown c. 500 BC, probably as a result of a much more complex and bloody revolution than the simple drama of the rape of Lucretia related by Livy, and that they were replaced by some form of collegiate rule. It is likely that the revolution that overthrew the Roman monarchy was engineered by the patrician caste and that its aim was not, as rationalised later by ancient authors, the establishment of a democracy, but of a patrician-dominated oligarchy. The proverbial "arrogance" and "tyranny" of the Tarquins, epitomised by the Lucretia incident, is probably a reflection of the patricians' fear of the Tarquins' growing power and their erosion of patrician privilege, most likely by drawing support from the plebeians (commoners). To ensure patrician supremacy, the autocratic power of the kings had to be fragmented and permanently curtailed. Thus, the replacement of a single ruler by a collegiate administration, which soon evolved into two Praetors, later called Consuls, with equal powers and limited terms of office (one year, instead of the life tenancy of the kings). In addition, power was further fragmented by the establishment of further collegiate offices, known to history as Roman magistrates: (three Aediles and four Quaestors). Patrician supremacy was assured by limiting eligibility to hold the republican offices to patricians only.

The establishment of a hereditary oligarchy obviously excluded wealthy non-patricians from political power and it is this class that led plebeian opposition to the early Republican settlement. The early Republic (510–338 BC) saw a long and often bitter struggle for political equality, known as the Conflict of the Orders, against the patrician monopoly of power. The plebeian leadership had the advantage that they represented the vast majority of the population, therefore also the majority of the Roman levy and of their own growing wealth. Milestones in their ultimately successful struggle are the establishment of a plebeian assembly (the concilium plebis) with some legislative power and to elect officers called tribunes of the plebs, who had the power to veto Senatorial decrees (494); and the opening of the Consulship to plebeians (367). By 338, the privileges of the patricians had become largely ceremonial (such as the exclusive right to hold certain state priesthoods). But this does not imply a more democratic form of government. The wealthy plebeians who had led the "plebeian revolution" had no more intention of sharing real power with their poorer and far more numerous fellow-plebeians than did the patricians. It was probably at this time (around 300 BC) that the population was divided, for the purposes of taxation and military service, into seven classes based on an assessment of their property. The two top classes, numerically the smallest, accorded themselves an absolute majority of the votes in the main electoral and legislative assembly. Oligarchy based on birth had been replaced by oligarchy based on wealth.

== Political organisation of the Roman Republic ==
By c. 300 BC, the Roman Republic had attained its evolved structure, which remained essentially unchanged for three centuries. In theory, Rome's republican constitution was democratic, based on the principle of the sovereignty of the Roman people. It had also developed an elaborate set of checks and balances to prevent the excessive concentration of power. The two Consuls, together with other republican Magistrates, were elected annually by the Roman citizenry (male citizens over 14 years old only) voting by centuria (voting constituency) at the comitia centuriata (electoral assembly), held each year on the Field of Mars in Rome. The popular assemblies also had the right to promulgate laws (leges). The Consuls, who combined both civil and military functions, had equal authority and the right to veto each other's decisions. The main policy-making institution, the Senate, was an unelected body composed mostly of Roman aristocrats but its decrees could not contravene leges, and motions in the Senate could be vetoed by any one of 10 tribunes of the plebs, elected by the concilium plebis, an assembly restricted to plebeian members only. The tribunes could also veto decisions made by the Consuls.

But these constitutional arrangements were far less democratic than they might appear, as elections were rigged heavily in favour of the wealthiest echelon of society. The centuriate organisation of the Roman citizen-body may be summarised as follows:

ANALYSIS OF ROMAN CENTURIATE ORGANISATION
Class	Property Rating (drachmae: denarii after 211 BC)	No. centuriae	Military service
Patricii (patricians)	n.a. (hereditary)	6	Officers/legionary cavalry
Equites (knights)	rating unknown	12	Officers/legionary cavalry
First	10,000–?	80	Legionary cavalry
Second	7,500–10,000	20	Legionary infantry
Third	5,000–7,500	20	Legionary infantry
Fourth	2,500–5,000	20	Legionary infantry
Fifth	400 (or 1,100)–2,500	30	Legionary infantry (velites)
Proletarii (a.k.a. capite censi)	Under 400 (or 1,100)	1	Fleets (oarsmen)

N.B. An extra four centuriae were allocated to engineers, trumpeters et al., to make a total of 193 centuriae. There is a discrepancy in the minimum rating for legionary service between Polybius (400 drachmae) and Livy (1,100). In addition, Polybius states that the proletarii were assigned to naval service while Livy simply states that they were exempt from military service. In both cases, Polybius is to be preferred, as 1,100 drachmae seems too high a figure for destitute individuals and it is likely that the Roman military would have made use of the manpower of this group.

The table shows that the richest two property classes combined, the equites (knights, including the six centuriae probably reserved for patricians), together with the first property class, were allocated an absolute majority of the votes (98 of 193 centuriae), despite being a small minority of the population. Their precise proportion is unknown, but was most likely under 5% of the citizen-body. These classes supplied a legion's cavalry, just 6.6% of the unit's total effectives (300 of 4,500), which is probably greater than their proportionate share, as the lowest class was excluded from legionary service. Overall, votes were allocated in inverse proportion to population. Thus the lowest social echelon (the proletarii, under 400 drachmae), was allocated just 1 of the 193 centuriae, despite being probably the largest. As Livy himself puts it: "Thus every citizen was given the illusion of wielding power through the right to vote, but in reality the aristocracy remained in full control. For the centuriae of knights were summoned first to vote, and then the centuriae of the First Property Class. In the rare event of a majority not being attained, the Second Class was called, but it was hardly ever necessary to consult the lowest classes." Also in its legislative capacity, the popular assembly offered little scope for democratic action. For this purpose, the comitia could only meet when summoned by a Magistrate. Participants could only vote (by centuria) for or against propositions (rogationes) put before them by the convening Magistrate. No amendments or motions from the floor were admissible. In modern terms, the legislative activity of the comitia amounted to no more than a series of referendums, and in no sense resembled the role of a parliament.

Further, the period of the Samnite Wars saw the emergence of the Senate as the predominant political organ at Rome. In the early Republic, the Senate had been an ad hoc advisory council whose members served at the pleasure of the Consuls. While no doubt influential as a group of friends and confidants of the Consuls, as well as experienced ex-Magistrates, the Senate had no formal or independent existence. Power rested with the Consuls, acting with the ratification of the comitia, a system described as "plebiscitary" by Cornell. This situation changed with the Lex Ovinia (promulgated sometime in the period from 339 to 318 BC), which transferred authority to appoint (and remove) members of the Senate from the Consuls to the Censors, two new Magistrates elected at 5-yearly intervals, whose specific job was to hold a census of Roman citizens and their property. The Lex Ovinia set specific criteria for such appointments or removals (although these are not precisely known). The result was that the Senate now became a formal constitutional entity. Its members now held office for life (or until expelled by the Censors), and were thus freed from control by the Consuls.

In the period following the Lex Ovinia, the Consuls were gradually reduced to executive servants of the Senate. The concentration of power in the hands of the Senate is exemplified by its assumption of the power of prorogatio, the extension of the imperium (mandate) of Consuls and other Magistrates beyond its single year. It appears that prorogatio could previously be granted only by the comitia e.g. in 326 BC. By the end of the Samnite Wars in 290, the Senate enjoyed complete control over virtually all aspects of political life: finance, war, diplomacy, public order and the state religion. The rise of the Senate's role was the inevitable consequence of the increasing complexity of the Roman state due to its expansion, which made government by short-term officers such as the Consuls and by plebiscite impractical.

The Senate's monopoly of power in turn entrenched the political supremacy of the wealthiest echelon. The 300 members of the Senate were mostly a narrow, self-perpetuating clique of ex-Consuls (consulares) and other ex-Magistrates, virtually all members of the wealthy classes. Within this elite, charismatic personalities, who might challenge senatorial supremacy by allying with the commoners, were neutralised by various devices, such as the virtual abolition of "iteration", the re-election of consuls for several successive terms, a practice common before 300 BC. (In the period from 366 to 291, eight individuals held the consulship four or more times, while from 289 to 255, none did, and few were even elected twice. Iteration was temporarily resorted to again during the emergency conditions of the Second Punic War). The Roman polity exhibited, in the words of T. J. Cornell, an historian of early Rome, "the classic symptoms of oligarchy, a system of government that depends on rotation of office within a competitive elite, and the suppression of charismatic individuals by peer-group pressure, usually exercised by a council of elders."

== External relations of early Rome ==
Because of the poverty of the sources, only the bare outline of Rome's external relations in the early period can be reliably discerned. It appears likely that Rome in the period 550–500, conventionally known as the period it was ruled by the Tarquin dynasty, established its hegemony over its Latin neighbours. The fall of the Roman monarchy was followed by a war with the Latins, who probably took advantage of the political turmoil in Rome to attempt to regain their independence. This war was brought to an end in 493 BC by the conclusion of a treaty called Foedus Cassianum, which lay the foundations for the Roman military alliance. According to the sources, this was a bilateral treaty between the Romans and the Latins. It provided for a perpetual peace between the two parties; a defensive alliance by which the parties pledged mutual assistance in case of attack; a promise not to aid or allow passage to each other's enemies; the equal division of spoils of war (half to Rome, half to the other Latins) and provisions to regulate trade between the parties. In addition, the treaty may have provided for the Latin armed forces levied under the treaty to be led by a Roman commander. These terms served as the basic template for Rome's treaties with all the other Italian socii acquired over the succeeding two centuries.

As we do not know the nature of the Tarquinian hegemony over the Latins, we cannot tell how the terms of the Cassian treaty differed from those imposed by the Tarquins. But it is likely that Tarquin rule was more onerous, involving the payment of tribute, while the Republican terms simply involved a military alliance. The impetus to form such an alliance was probably provided by the acute insecurity caused by a phase of migration and invasion of the lowland areas by Italic mountain tribes in the period after 500 BC. The Sabines, Aequi and Volsci neighbours of Latium assailed the Latins, the Samnites invaded and subjugated the Greco-Etruscan cities of Campania, while the Messapii, Lucani and Bruttii in the South attacked the Greek coastal cities, crippling Tarentum and reducing the independent Greek cities on the Tyrrhenian coast to just Neapolis and Velia.

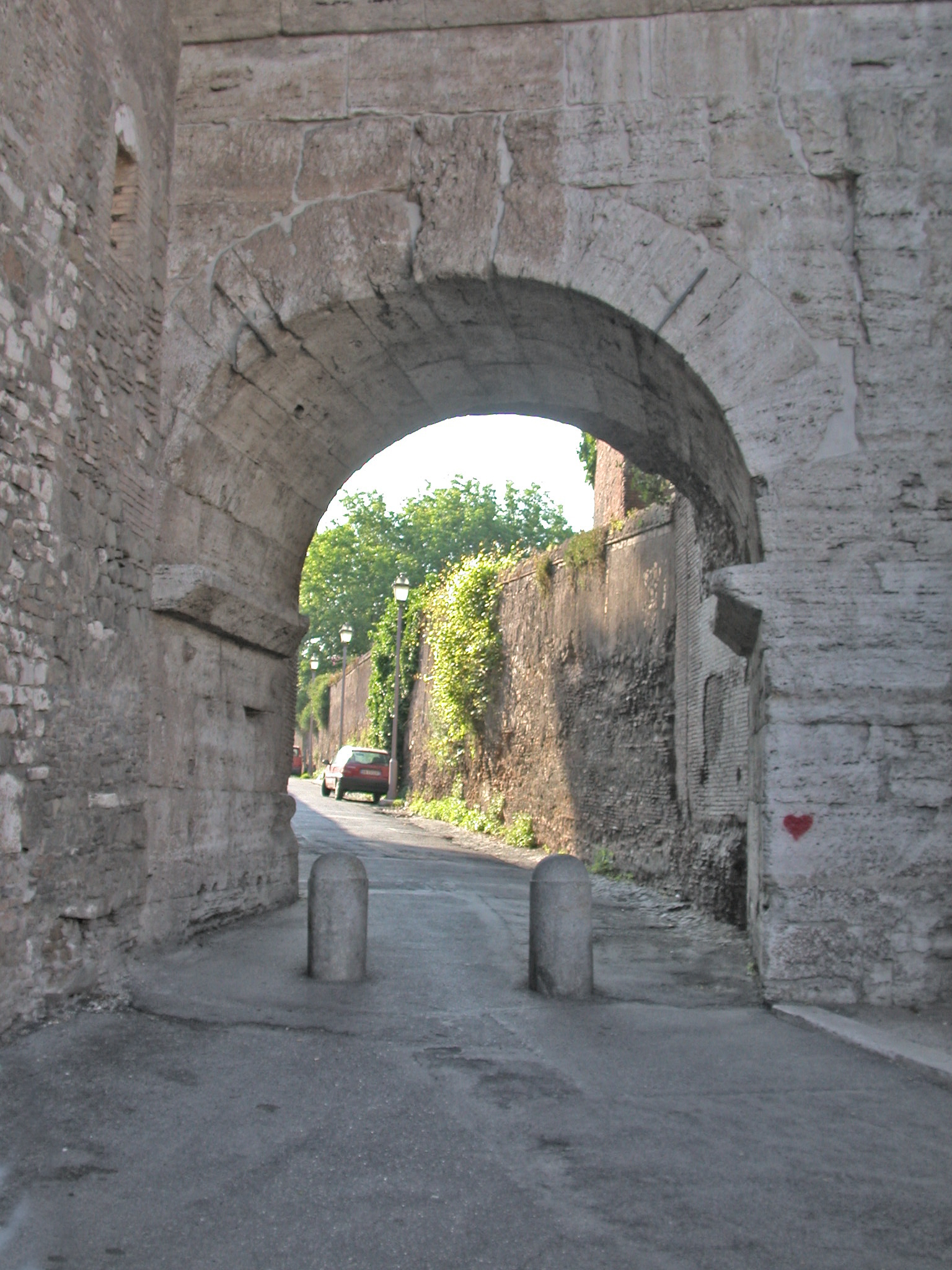
Gate in the Servian Wall of Rome, on the Caelian Hill. The wall, made of massive tufa stone blocks, was built just after Rome was sacked by the Gauls in 390 BC

The new Romano-Latin military alliance proved strong enough to repel the incursions of the Italic mountain tribes, but it was a very tough struggle. Intermittent wars, with mixed fortunes, continued until c. 395 BC. The Sabines disappear from the record in 449 (presumably subjugated by the Romans), while campaigns against the Aequi and Volsci seem to have reached a turning point with the major Roman victory on Mount Algidus in 431. In the same period, the Romans fought three wars against their nearest neighbouring Etruscan city-state, Veii, finally reducing the city in 396. Although the annexation of Veii's territory probably increased the ager Romanus by c. 65%, this seems a modest gain for a century of warfare.

At this juncture, Rome was crushed by an invasion of central Italy by the Senones Gallic tribe. Routed at the river Allia in 390 BC, the Roman army fled to Veii, leaving their city at the mercy of the Gauls, who proceeded to ransack it and then demand a huge ransom in gold to leave. The effects of this disaster on Roman power are a matter of controversy between scholars. The ancient authors emphasize the catastrophic nature of the damage, claiming that it took a long time for Rome to recover. Cornell, however, argues that the ancients greatly exaggerated the effects and cites the lack of archaeological evidence for major destruction, the early resumption of an aggressive expansionist policy and the building of the "Servian" Wall as evidence that Rome recovered swiftly. The Wall, whose 11 km-circuit enclosed 427 hectares (an increase of 50% over the Tarquinian city) was a massive project which would have required an estimated five million man-hours to complete, implying plentiful financial and labour resources. Against this, Eckstein argues that the history of Rome in the 50 years subsequent to 390 appears a virtual replay of the previous century. There were wars against the same enemies except Veii (i.e. the Volsci, Aequi and Etruscans) in the same geographical area, and indeed against other Latin city-states, such as Praeneste and Tibur, just 30 miles away. In addition, a treaty concluded with Carthage c. 348 seems to describe Rome's sphere of control as much the same area as in a previous treaty signed in the first years of the Republic 150 years earlier: just the Latium Vetus, and not even all of that.

== Roman conquest of Italy 338–264 BC ==
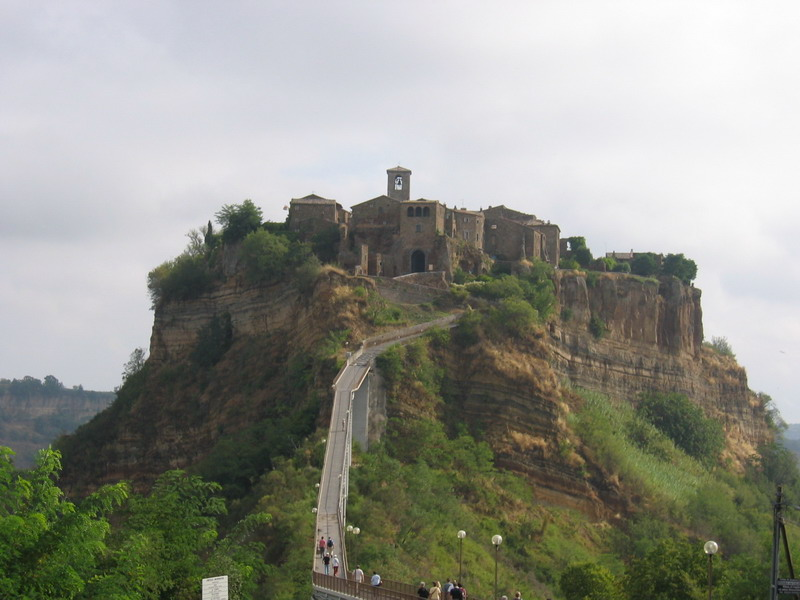
Site of a typical Etruscan hill town. Civita di Bagnoregio, Lazio, Italy

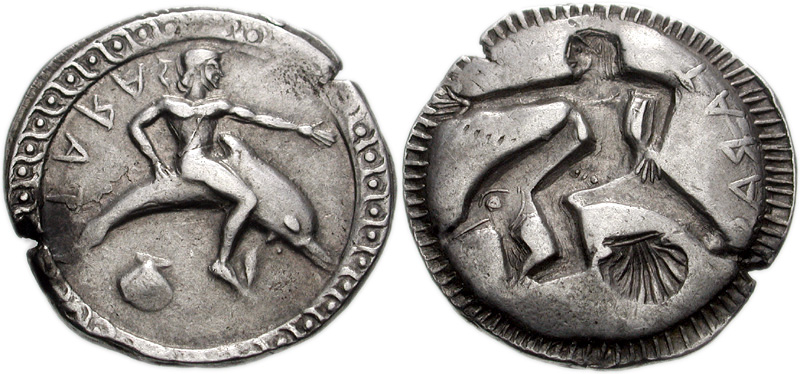
Silver nomos coin issued by the Greek city of Tarentum in southern Italy, c. 500 BC. The coin is incuse i.e. reverse side is mirror image of obverse. Obverse shows hero Phalanthos riding a dolphin, the traditional symbol of the city, with legend ΤΑΡΑΣ (TARAS), the Greek name for Tarentum

The 75-year period between 338 BC and the outbreak of the First Punic War in 264 saw an explosion of Roman expansion and the subjugation of the entire peninsula to Roman political hegemony, achieved by virtually incessant warfare. Roman territory (ager Romanus) grew enormously in size, from c. 5,500 to 27,000 km^{2}, c. 20% of peninsular Italy. The Roman citizen population nearly tripled, from c. 350,000 to c. 900,000, c. 30% of the peninsular population. Latin colonies probably comprised a further 10% of the peninsula (about 12,500 km^{2}). The remaining 60% of the peninsula remained in the hands of other Italian socii who were, however, forced to accept Roman supremacy.

The expansion phase started with the defeat of the Latin League (338 BC) and the annexation of most of Latium Vetus. Subsequently, the main thrusts of expansion were southwards towards the Volturno river, annexing the territories of the Aurunci, Volsci, Sidicini and the Campanians themselves; and eastwards across the centre of the peninsula towards the Adriatic coast, incorporating the Hernici, Sabini, Aequi and Picentes. The years after the departure of Pyrrhus in 275 saw a further round of annexation, of substantial territories in southern Italy at the expense of the Lucani and Bruttii. The Bruttii lost large forest lands, whose timber was needed to build ships and the Lucani lost their most fertile land, the coastal plain on which the Latin colony of Paestum was established in 273. In the North, the Romans annexed the ager Gallicus, a large stretch of plain on the Adriatic coast from the Senones Gallic tribe, with a Latin colony at Ariminum in 268. By 264, Rome controlled the entire Italian peninsula, either directly as Roman territory or indirectly through the socii.

The prevailing explanation for this explosive expansion, as proposed in W. V. Harris' War and Imperialism in Republican Rome (1979), is that the Roman state was an exceptionally martial society, whose every class from the aristocracy downwards was militarised and whose economy was based on the spoils of annual warfare. Rome's neighbouring peoples, on the other hand, were seen as essentially passive victims who strove, ultimately unsuccessfully, to defend themselves against Roman aggression. More recently, however, Harris' theory of Roman "exceptionalism" has been challenged by A. M. Eckstein, who points out that Rome's neighbours were equally militaristic and aggressive and that Rome was just one competitor for territory and hegemony in a peninsula whose interstate relations were largely anarchic and lacking effective mechanisms for resolution of interstate disputes. It was a world of continuous struggle for survival, of terrores multi for the Romans, a phrase from Livy that Eckstein uses to describe the politico-military situation in the peninsula before the imposition of the pax Romana. The reasons for the Romans' ultimate triumph was their superior manpower and political and military organisation.

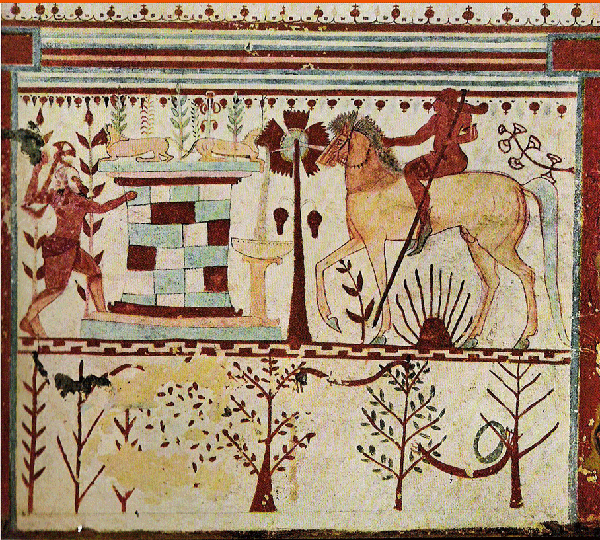
Etruscan tomb mural depicting the ambush of Troilus by Achilles, portrayed as an Etruscan foot warrior and a mounted warrior (mid-sixth century BC. Tomb of the Bulls, Tarquinia, Italy)

Eckstein points out that it took 200 years of warfare for Rome to subdue just its Latin neighbours, as the Latin War did not end until 338 BC. This demonstrates that the other Latin cities were as martial as Rome itself. Before pax Romana, the Etruscan city-states to the north existed, like the Latin states, in a state of "militarised anarchy", with chronic and fierce competition for territory and hegemony. The evidence is that every Etruscan city until 500 BC was sited on virtually impregnable hilltops and cliff edges. Despite these natural defences, they all acquired walls by 400. Etruscan culture was highly militaristic. Graves with weapons and armour were common and captured enemies were often offered as human sacrifice and their severed heads displayed in public, as happened to 300 Roman prisoners at Tarquinii in 358. It took the Romans a century and four wars (480–390) just to reduce Veii, a single neighbouring Etruscan city.

To the South, the Samnites had a reputation for martial ferocity unrivalled in the peninsula. Tough mountain-dwelling pastoralists, they are believed to have invented the manipular fighting unit adopted by the Romans. Like the Romans, their national symbol was a wolf, but a male wolf on the prowl, not a she-wolf suckling babies. All graves of male Samnites contain weapons. Livy several times describes the barbarity of their raids into Campania. Their military effectiveness was greatly enhanced by the formation of the Samnite League by the four Samnite tribal cantons (the Caudini, Hirpini, Caraceni and Pentri). This brought their forces under the unified command of a single general in times of crisis. It took the Romans three gruelling wars (the Samnite Wars, 343–290 BC), during which they suffered many severe reverses, to subjugate the Samnites. Even after this, the Samnites remained implacable enemies of Rome, seizing every opportunity to throw off the Roman yoke. They rebelled and joined both Pyrrhus and Hannibal when these invaded Italy (275 and 218 BC respectively). In the Social War (91–88 BC), the Samnites were the core of the rebel coalition, and Samnite generals led the Italian forces.

The southern Greek city of Taras (Tarentum) had been founded by colonists from Sparta. They retained some of their founders' martial culture. With the best natural harbour in Italy and a fertile hinterland, it was faced from the start with fierce competition from the other Greek colonies and resistance from the indigenous Messapii, an Illyrian-speaking people that occupied what the Romans called Calabria (the heel of Italy). By around 350 BC, the Tarentine statesman Archytas had established the city's hegemony over both sets of rivals. The city's army of 30,000 foot and 4,000 cavalry was then the largest in the peninsula. Tarentine cavalry was renowned for its quality and celebrated in the city's coins, which often showed youths on horseback placing wreaths over their mount's head. The Tarentines' most important cult was to Nike, the Greek goddess of Victory. A famous status of Nike which stood in the city centre was ultimately transferred to the Senate House in Rome by the emperor Augustus.

== Pattern of Roman expansion ==
The rise of Roman hegemony by three main means: (a) direct annexation of territory and incorporation of the existing inhabitants; (b) the foundation of Latin colonies on territory confiscated from defeated peoples; and (c) the binding of defeated peoples to Rome by treaties of perpetual alliance.

(a) Since the inhabitants of Latium Vetus were the Romans' fellow-tribesmen, there was no reluctance to grant them full citizenship. But annexations outside Latium Vetus soon gathered pace. The Romans then encountered the problem that their new subjects could, if granted full Roman citizenship, outnumber original Latins in the citizen body, threatening Rome's ethnic and cultural integrity. The problem as solved by introducing civitas sine suffragio ("non-voting citizenship"), a second-class status which carried all the rights and obligations of full citizenship except the right to vote. By this device, the Roman republic could enlarge its territory without losing its character as a Latin city-state. The most important use of this device was the incorporation of the Campanian city-states into the ager Romanus, bringing the most fertile agricultural land in the peninsula and a large population under Roman control. Also incorporated sine suffragio were several tribes on the fringes of Latium Vetus that had until that time been long-time enemies of Rome: the Aurunci, Volsci, Sabini and Aequi.

(b) Alongside direct annexation, the second vehicle of Roman expansion was the colonia (colony), both Roman and Latin. Under Roman law, the lands of a surrendering enemy (dediticii) became the property of the Roman state. Some would be allocated to the members of a new Roman or Latin colony. Some would be held as ager publicus (state-owned land) and rented out to Roman tenant-farmers. The rest would be returned to the defeated enemy in return for the latter's adherence to the Roman military alliance.

The 19 Latin colonies founded in the period 338–263 outnumbered the Roman ones by four to one. This is because they involved a mixed Roman/original Latin/Italian allied population, and so could more easily attract the necessary number of settlers. But because of the mix, the settlers did not hold citizenship (the Romans among them lost their full citizenship). Instead, they were granted the iura Latina ("Latin rights") held by original Latins before their incorporation into the citizen body. In essence, these rights were similar to the civitates sine suffragio, except that the Latin colonists were technically not citizens, but peregrini ("foreigners"), although they could recover their citizenship by returning to Roman territory. The question arises as to why the Latin colonists were not simply accorded citizenship sine suffragio. The answer is probably for reasons of military security. Classified as non-citizens, the Latins served in the allied alae, not the legions. There they could act as loyal "watchdogs" on potentially treacherous Italian socii, while the Romans/original Latins performed the same function in the legions on their sine suffragio colleagues.

The post-338 Latin colonies comprised 2,500–6,000 adult male settlers (average 3,700) based on an urban centre with a territorium of an average size of 370 km^{2}. The territorium would frequently consist of some of the defeated people's best agricultural land, since the social function of colonies was to satisfy the Romans' land-hungry peasantry. But the choice of site for a colonia was primarily dictated by strategic considerations. Coloniae were situated at key geographical points: the coasts (e.g. Antium, Ariminum), the exits to mountain passes (Alba Fucens), major road intersections (Venusia) and river fords (Interamna). Also colonies would be sited to provide a defensive barrier between Rome and her allies and potential enemies, as well as to separate those enemies from each other and keep watch on their activity: a divide-and-rule strategy. Thus Rome's string of colonies and eventual annexation of a belt of territory across the centre of the Italian peninsula was driven by the strategic aim of separating the Etruscans from the Samnites and interdicting a potential coalition of these powerful nations.

(c) However, the Romans generally did not annex the whole of the conquered enemy territory, but only selected portions. The defeated peoples generally retained the major part of their territory and their political autonomy. Their sovereignty was only limited in the fields of military and foreign policy, by a treaty with Rome which often varied in detail but always required them to provide troops to serve under Roman command and to "have the same friends and enemies as Rome" (in effect prohibiting them from waging war on other socii and from conducting independent diplomacy). In some cases, no territory was annexed. For example, after the defeat of Pyrrhus in 275 BC, the Greek city-states of the South were accepted as Roman allies without any loss of territory regardless of whether they had backed Pyrrhus. This was due to the Romans' admiration of Greek culture and the fact that most of the cities contained pro-Roman aristocracies whose interests coincided with the Romans'. By the brutal standards of pre-hegemonic Italy, therefore, the Romans were relatively generous to their defeated foes, a further reason for their success.

A good case-study of how the Romans employed sophisticated divide-and-rule strategies in order to control potentially dangerous enemies is the political settlement imposed on the Samnites after three gruelling wars. The central aim was to prevent a restoration of the Samnite League, a confederation of these warlike tribes which had proved hugely dangerous. After 275 BC, the League's territory was split into three independent cantons: Samnium, Hirpinum and Caudium. A broad belt of Samnite territory was annexed, separating the Samnites from their neighbours to the north - the Marsi and Paeligni. Two Latin colonies were founded in the heart of Samnite territory to act as "watchdogs".

The final feature of Roman hegemony was the construction of a number of paved highways all over the peninsula, revolutionising communication and trade. The most famous and important was the Via Appia, from Rome to Brundisium via Campania (opened 312 BC). Others were the Via Salaria to Picenum, the Via Flaminia from Rome to Arretium (Arezzo), and the Via Cassia into Etruria.

== Benefits of Roman hegemony ==
Incorporation into the Roman military confederation thus entailed significant burdens for the socius: the loss of substantial territory, the loss of freedom of action in foreign relations, heavy military obligations and a complete lack of say in how those military contributions were used. Against these, however, must be set the very important advantages of the system for the socii.

By far the most important was the liberation of the socii from the perpetual intertribal warfare of the pre-hegemonic peninsula. Endemic chaos was replaced by the pax Romana. Each socius' remaining territory was secure from aggression by neighbours. As warfare between socii was now prohibited, inter-social disputes were settled by negotiation or, ever more frequently, by Roman arbitration. The confederation also acted as the peninsula's defender against external invasion and domination. Gallic invasions from the North were, from 390 BC when the Senones destroyed Rome, seen as the most serious danger and continued into the first century BC. Many were so large that they could only realistically be turned back by a common effort of all Italians, organised by the confederation. The Romans even coined a specific term for such a mobilisation: the tumultus Gallicus, an emergency levy of all able-bodied men, even men over 46 years of age (who were normally exempt from military service). During the third century BC, the confederation successfully repulsed the invasion of Pyrrhus and of Hannibal, which threatened to subject the whole peninsula to Greek and Punic domination respectively. The last such levy was as late as 60 BC, on the eve of Julius Caesar's conquest of Gaul itself.

At the same time, the military burden on the socii, though heavy, amounted to only around half that on Roman citizens, since the socii population outnumbered the Romans by roughly two to one, but normally provided roughly the same number of troops to the confederate levy. During the Samnite Wars, the burden on Romans was extremely onerous. The standard levy was raised from two to four legions and military operations took place every single year. This implies that c. 16% of all Roman adult males spent every campaigning season under arms in this period, rising to 25% during emergencies. Nevertheless, the socii were allowed to share the spoils of war, the main remuneration of Republican levy soldiers (since pay was minimal), on an equal basis with Roman citizens. This allowed socii soldiers to return home at the end of each campaigning season with substantial capital and was important in reconciling the socii to service outside Italy, especially in the second century BC.

The Italian allies enjoyed complete autonomy outside the fields of military and foreign policy. They maintained their traditional forms of government, language, laws, taxation and coinage. None were even required to accept a Roman garrison on their territory (except for the special cases of the Greek cities of Tarentum, Metapontum and Rhegium) at the start of the Second Punic War).

Thus the costs and benefits of membership of the confederation were finely balanced. For some socii, at some periods, primarily the more powerful or aggressive nations that could aspire to Italian hegemony themselves (Samnites, Capua, Tarentum), the costs appeared too high, and these repeatedly took the opportunity to rebel. Others, for whom the benefits of security from aggressive neighbours and external invaders outweighed the burdens, remained loyal.

== Military organisation of the Roman alliance ==
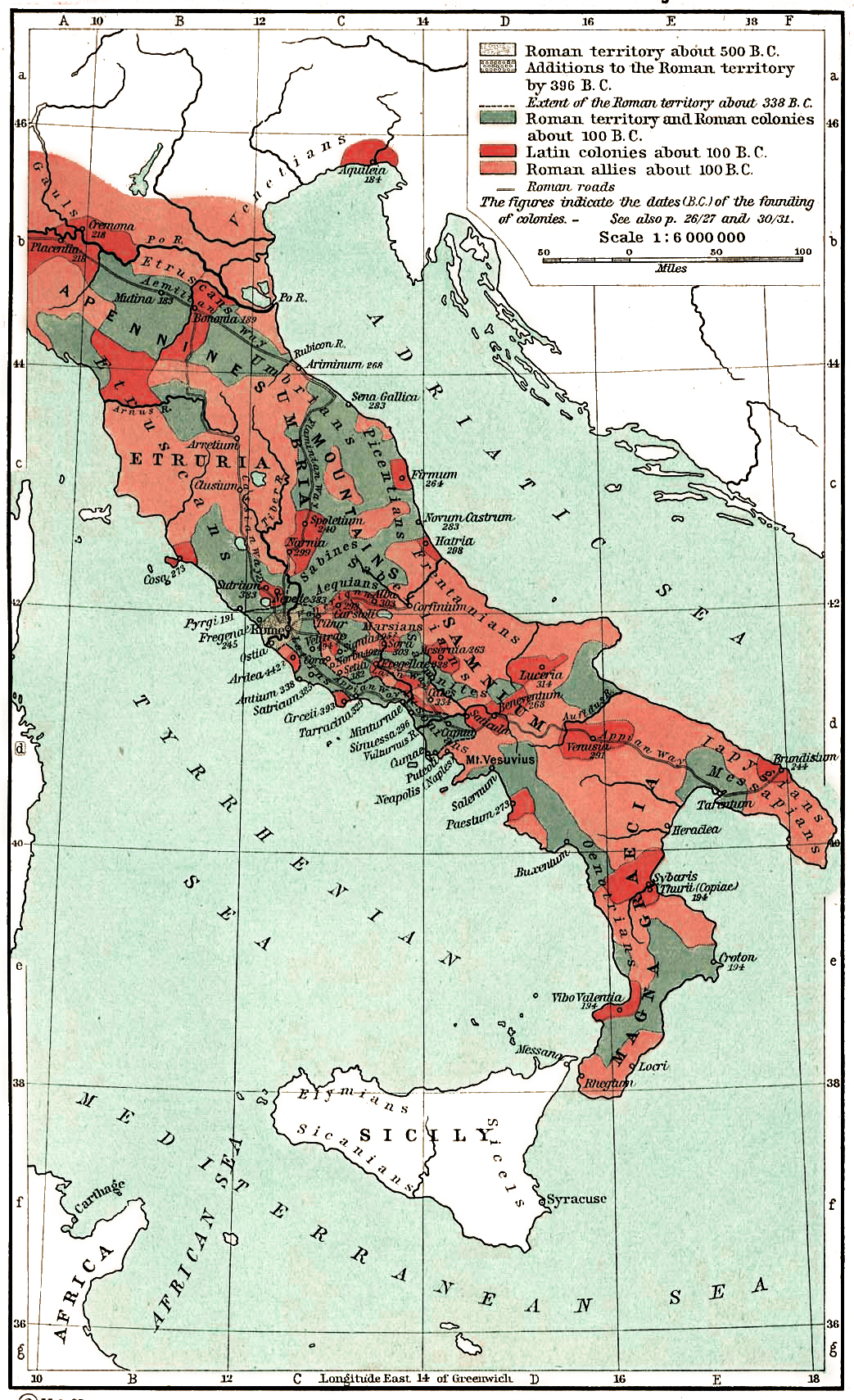
Map of the Roman confederation in 100 BC, on the eve of the Social War. Note the patchwork political configuration. The Roman possessions (in grey-blue) straddle the strategic centre of the Italian peninsula and the Tyrrhenian coastal plain. Latin colonies (dark red) are scattered in strategic locations. Other socii (pink) are concentrated in the mountainous interior

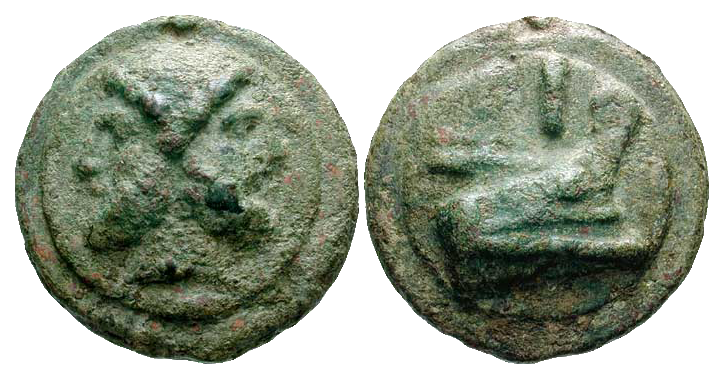
Roman copper aes grave coin of the First Punic War era. (Obverse) head of Janus, the two-faced god. (Reverse) prow of a warship, a common motif of coins of this period, and virtually a symbol of the Roman Republic (c. 240 BC)

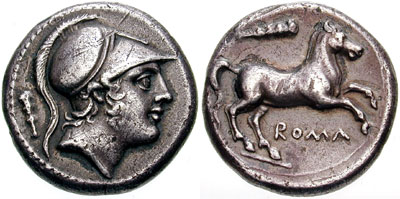
Roman silver didrachm c. 225 BC. (Obverse) head of Mars, the Roman god of war. (Reverse) horse rearing and legend ROMA. Note club on both sides, likely a reference to Hercules. Until the launch of the denarius c. 211 BC, during the Second Punic War, the Romans used Greek-style drachmae for their silver currency. They were generally minted for Rome in the Greek cities of S. Italy (esp. Neapolis)

The modern term "Roman confederation" used by some historians to describe the Roman military alliance is misleading, as it implies some form of common political structure. Instead, there were no federal political institutions, and indeed not even formal procedures for effective consultation. Any socius that wished to make representations about policy could do so only by dispatching an ad hoc delegation to the Roman Senate. Military and foreign policy lay entirely in the hands of the Roman executive authorities, the Consuls and the policy-making body, the Senate. There existed Italian precedents for a federal political structure e.g. the Latin League and the Samnite League. But the idea of sharing power with the Latin colonists, let alone the other socii, was anathema to the Roman senatorial elite. Livy relates how after Cannae, as the Senate ranks were depleted by the deaths of 80 senators in the battle, a proposal was put forward that the vacancies should be filled by leaders of the Latin colonies. It was indignantly rejected quasi-unanimously. Livy adds that a similar proposal had been made previously by the Latin colonists themselves, with the same result.

The Roman consular army brought together both Roman and socii units. For the 250 years between 338 BC and the Social War, legions were always accompanied by allied alae on campaign. Usually, a consular army would contain an equal number of legions and alae, although, because of variations in the size of the respective units, the ratio of socii to Romans in a consular army could vary from 2:1 to 1:1, though it was normally closer to the latter.

In most cases, the socius' sole treaty obligation to Rome was to supply to the confederate army, on demand, a number of fully equipped troops up to a specified maximum each year. The vast majority of socii were required to supply land troops (both infantry and cavalry), although most of the coastal Greek colonies were socii navales ("naval allies"), whose obligation was to provide either partly or fully crewed warships to the Roman fleet. Little is known about the size of contingent each socius was bound to provide, and whether it was proportional to population or wealth.

The confederation did not maintain standing or professional military forces, but levied them, by compulsory conscription, as required for each campaigning season. They would then be disbanded at the end of a conflict. To spread the burden, no man was required to serve more than 16 campaign seasons.

The Roman and allied levies were kept in separate formations. Roman citizens were assigned to the legions, while the Latin and Italian allies were organised into alae (literally: "wings", because they were always posted on the flanks of the Roman line of battle). A normal consular army would contain two legions and two alae, or about 20,000 men (17,500 infantry and 2,400 cavalry). In times of emergency, a Consul might be authorised to raise a double-strength army of four legions and four alae e.g. at the Battle of Cannae in 216 BC, where each Consul commanded an army of about 40,000 men.

=== Manpower ===
Polybius states that the Romans and their allies could draw on a grand total of 770,000 men fit to bear arms (of which 70,000 met the property requirement for cavalry) in 225 BC, shortly before the start of the Second Punic War. The Romans reportedly asked their allies for an urgent register of all "men fit to bear arms" for a tumultus Gallicus. Polybius' subtotals, however, are garbled, as he divides them into two sections, troops actually deployed and those registered as available. It is mostly believed that Polybius' figures refer to adult male iuniores i.e. persons of military age (16–46 years of age).

There are a number of difficulties with Polybius' figures, which are discussed in detail in P. A. Brunt's seminal study, Italian Manpower (1971): On the basis of Brunt's comments, Polybius' figures may be revised and reorganised as follows: (Note: Revision of Polybius' manpower figures: The following criteria are used: 1. The most important problem is that by listing those troops deployed separately from those registered, Polybius is probably double-counting the former. Therefore, the figures for Romans and general socii deployed should be stripped out. On the other hand, the figures for specified socii deployed, (Etruscans/Sabines and Umbrians/Sarsinates) probably refer to their registered totals (the Sabines were Roman citizens by this time, so the former total refers to Etruscans only).; 2. The Campanians registered are included in the Roman total: correctly, as they were Roman citizens (sine suffragio). But in view of their distinctive identity and the fact that they went over to Hannibal after Cannae, it is useful to separate them. According to Livy, the Campanians registered fit for service were 30,000 infantry and 4,000 cavalry in 216 BC. However, these figures, quoted in a speech to the Capuan senate by the defeated consul Varro after Cannae, probably exclude the Campanians already serving in the legions. These would have suffered losses in the battles of Trebia, Trasimene and Cannae proportionate to the Romans'. Since these amounted to c. 60,000, the Campanians may have suffered c. 8,000 losses (15% of the Roman total, comparing Varro's to Polybius' figures) of which c. 1,000 cavalry (12%, the same as in Varro's figures). Therefore, the total Campanian capacity was probably c. 37,000 infantry and 5,000 cavalry.; 3. Polybius' "Iapygians/Messapians" (i.e. Apulians) are given an improbably large cavalry. It is possibly a copying error, and should perhaps be 6,000 instead of 16,000.; 4. Polybius does not give figures for the Greeks or the Bruttii allies in southern Italy. This was probably because the Greeks were normally called on to supply crews for the fleets and the Bruttii were perhaps too far away (or too unreliable) to be asked to contribute to the defence against the Gauls. According to Livy, the Bruttians attacked Croton with 15,000 men in 215 BC and this figure will be assumed as their total strength in 225. As for the Greek cities, it is believed that their population had suffered severe diminution due to attacks by their Italic neighbours in the period from 350 to 275 BC, and as Rome's socii navales (naval allies) in the First Punic War. Most were now very small (e.g. Croton with under 2,000 citizens), save for Tarentum and Neapolis. Tarentum was still the most powerful Greek city. Strabo suggests that Tarentum's army, probably at its peak around 300 BC, amounted to 30,000 foot and 4,000 horse. At that time, Tarentum controlled a much larger territory and thus its manpower in 225 was probably considerably lower. The Strabo figures for Tarentum are therefore assumed to represent the total land forces the Greek cities could deploy.)

Iuniores (males 16–46 years) fit for service, 225 BC
Contingent	Infantry	Cavalry	Total
Romans	213,000	18,000	231,000
Latin colonies	80,000	5,000	85,000
Etruscans	50,000	4,000	54,000
Central Italians	40,000	4,000	44,000
Samnites	70,000	7,000	77,000
Campanians*	37,000	5,000	42,000
Apulians	50,000	6,000	56,000
Greeks	30,000	4,000	34,000
Lucani, Bruttii	45,000	3,000	48,000
Total	615,000	56,000	671,000

* Campanians were technically Roman citizens sine suffragio, not socii.

== Historical cohesion of the Roman alliance ==
This section deals with how successfully the Rome's alliance with the socii withstood the military challenges it faced in the two and a half centuries of its existence (338–88 BC). The challenges may be divided into three broad periods: (1) 338 to 281 BC, when the confederation was tested mainly by challenges from other Italian powers, especially the Samnites; (2) 281 to 201 BC, when the main threat to the confederation was intervention in Italy by non-Italian powers i.e. Pyrrhus' invasion (281 to 275 BC) and Hannibal's invasion (218 to 203 BC); (3) 201 to 90 BC when the socii were called upon to support the Rome's imperialist expansion outside Italy. Elements of all three phases overlap: for example, Gallic invasions of the peninsula from the North recurred throughout the period.

=== Samnite Wars ===
Phase I (338–281 BC) was dominated by the three Samnite Wars, the result of which was the subjugation of the Romans' main military rival on the peninsula, the Samnite league. The loyalty of the then socii during this period appears to have remained largely solid. There were sporadic revolts: in 315, 306, 269, and 264 BC by some Campanian cities, the Aurunci, Hernici, and Piceni, respectively. But these were isolated cases and never turned into a general revolt of the socii. Most importantly, when in 297–3 Rome faced its gravest threat in this period, a coalition of Samnites and Gauls, the socii of the time did not abandon Rome. At the Battle of Sentinum (295), where a huge combined army of Samnites and Gauls suffered a crushing defeat, the socii contingents actually outnumbered the 18,000 Romans (4 legions deployed).

=== Pyrrhic War ===
Phase II (281–203 BC) saw even greater trials of the confederation's cohesion by external invaders with large and sophisticated armies. The intervention in southern Italy of the Epirote king Pyrrhus (281–275 BC), with 25,000 troops, brought the Romans into conflict with a Hellenistic professional army for the first time. Pyrrhus had been invited by Tarentum, which had been alarmed by Roman encroachment in Lucania.

The arrival of Pyrrhus triggered a widespread revolt by the southern socii, the Samnites, Lucani and Bruttii. But the revolt was far from universal. The Campanians and Apulians largely remained loyal to Rome. This was probably due to their long-standing antagonism to the Samnites and Tarentines respectively. Neapolis, the key Greek city on the Tyrrhenian, also refused to join Pyrrhus, due to its rivalry with Tarentum. This demonstrates a critical element in the success of Rome's military confederation: the socii were so divided by mutual antagonisms, often regarding their neighbours as far greater threats than the Romans, that they were never able to stage a universal revolt. The pattern is similar to that of the next great foreign challenge, Hannibal's invasion of Italy (see below). The central Italians (Etruscans and Umbrians) remained loyal, while the southern Italians, with significant exceptions, rebelled. The exceptions were also the similar, save for the Campanians, who joined Hannibal in the later episode.

In the event, the Roman forces surprised Pyrrhus by proving a good match for his own, which was unexpected, given that the Romans were temporary levies pitted against professionals. The Romans won one major battle (Beneventum) and lost two (Heraclea and Asculum), although in these they inflicted such heavy casualties on the enemy that the term "Pyrrhic victory" was coined. The defeat at Beneventum forced Pyrrhus to withdraw in 275, but it was not until 272 that the rebel socii were reduced. The surviving accounts for this later phase of the war are thin, but its scale is clear from Rome's celebration of 10 triumphs, each implying the slaughter of at least 5,000 enemy.

=== Second Punic War ===
The loose federation's gravest trial came with the Second Punic War and Hannibal's invasion of Italy (218–201 BC). This was not only because the Romans suffered a string of devastating defeats, but also because Hannibal's entire war strategy was to break up the confederation by inducing the socii to rebel against Rome's hegemony and join a counter-alliance under Hannibal's overall command. In the event, he had only mixed success:

1. Of the Roman citizens sine suffragio (which were mainly Italic tribes wholly annexed to the Roman state) Hannibal scored one major success: the defection of most of the Campanians. This was the most surprising of the defections, as the Campanians had been loyal allies of Rome since the 340's BC, when they requested Roman protection from Samnite incursions. They had also remained loyal during the Pyrrhic invasion, as Pyrrhus was the champion of the Campanians' other main rivals, the Italiote Greeks. The deciding factor in Capua's defection from Rome appears to have been the prospect of replacing Rome as Italy's leading city.
2. Not a single Latin colony defected to Hannibal, despite the latter's policy of treating the Latin colonists in the same way as other socii: i.e. releasing captured Latin soldiers without ransom and sparing the colonies' territory from devastation. The closest any Latin colonies came to mutiny was in 209 BC (after eight years of war), when 12 colonies sent a delegation to Rome to inform the Senate that they had run out of men and money and could supply no more troops. But even this was not a defection to the enemy, but an attempt to pressure the Senate into making peace. The inhabitants of the colonies were descendants of Romans and original Latins and were bound to Rome by ethnic solidarity (although they had nominally lost their citizenship, they could automatically regain it by moving to Roman territory). In addition, the colonists occupied land seized from the neighbouring Italic tribes, which the latter were keen to regain. They therefore had little to gain and everything to lose by joining Hannibal's Italic coalition. (None even joined the Italian coalition in the Social War over a century later, when there was no external threat).
3. Of Rome's Italian socii, Hannibal largely failed to win over the central Italians. The Etruscans and the Umbrian-speaking tribes (Marsi, Marrucini, Paeligni and Frentani) remained loyal. In the later years of the war, the Romans suspected some Etruscan city-states of plotting treachery and took limited military precautions, but no substantial revolt ever materialised. Etruscan ancestral fear of Hannibal's Gallic allies was probably the decisive factor, plus intense rivalry between individual city-states. The central Italians' loyalty to Rome was a critical strategic obstruction to Hannibal, as it reinforced the belt of Roman territory through central Italy that cut off his southern alliance from his Gallic allies in the Po valley, preventing the latter from sending him reinforcements.
4. Hannibal won over most of the minor Oscan-speaking socii of southern Italy: Bruttii and Lucani, as well as the minority of the Greek city-states. The adherence of much of southern Italy gave Hannibal a relatively stable power-base that sustained his military presence in Italy for 13 years after Cannae. The Samnites, Bruttii and Lucani were, as demonstrated above, the biggest losers in Rome's territorial expansion. Of the Greek cities of the Ionian Sea, Tarentum would certainly have defected immediately after Cannae if it hadn't been under the control of a Roman garrison, placed there in 218 BC to prevent precisely such an event. The Tarentines eventually succeeded in allowing in Hannibal's army in 212, although the Romans continued to hold the citadel, which reduced the value of the gain for Hannibal. Thurii, Heraclea, Metapontum, Locri and Croton did defect after Cannae. But even in the South, defections to Hannibal were by no means universal. Apart from the Arpini in the north of Apulia, the rest of the Apulians and the Messapii mostly remained loyal to Rome, as they had done during the Pyrrhic invasion and for the same reason: fear of Tarentine expansionism. The Greek cities on the Tyrrhenian Sea — Rhegium and Neapolis — also refused to defect and remained staunchly loyal to Rome after Cannae. The Neapolitans had an intense rivalry with the Campanians, while the Rhegians had long struggled for survival against Hannibal's Bruttian allies. Also, for both cities, Tarentine hegemony was anathema. Neapolis was the main seaport of Campania, which in turn was the principal theatre of war. Rhegium controlled one shore of the Strait of Messina and thus hindered Hannibal's communications with Carthaginian forces in Sicily. For these reasons, Hannibal's failure to take these two strategic ports greatly complicated the reinforcement and resupply of his army from Africa. Finally, all four of the major Samnite tribes, refused to join their minor compatriots' revolt.

Even among those city-states of southern Italy that did defect, opinion was often bitterly divided by a class struggle between the aristocracy and the commoners, led by dissident charismatic aristocrats. The local aristocracies tried to retain a monopoly of political power (i.e. an oligarchy), while the dissident aristocrats favoured a "democracy", in which power was exercised by a popular assembly, which they could then manipulate to establish their own ascendancy. Since Rome supported oligarchies, similar to their own system, the senates of cities such as Capua and Tarentum were largely pro-Roman. (Note: Capua's rebel senators: Despite the Capuan senate's traditional pro-Roman posture, it seems that after Cannae, the majority of senators were won over to Hannibal's cause. It is possible that many pro-Roman senators had fallen fighting in that battle (as did some 80 Roman senators). From Livy's lengthy account, it appears that the central motivation for the rest was the opportunity for Capua to replace Rome as the leading city of Italy. Livy states that many Capuan senators had intermarried with Roman noble families, which might seem a reason for loyalty. But this very link may have resulted in even greater resentment of Capua's subordinate role. In addition, the senate's power had been compromised by a bloodless democratic coup led by a pro-democratic senator called Calavius. Nevertheless, there remained significant opposition to the defection amongst senators.) Carthaginian society was itself even more oligarchic than Rome's. But by necessity, rather than from ideological conviction, the Carthaginians backed the anti-Roman democratic factions. Tarentum (212 BC) was delivered to Hannibal by the local democratic faction. (After the war, Hannibal himself supported democratic reform at Carthage, but whether he would have done so had Carthage won the war cannot be determined).

Using the military manpower figures given in the table above, the Italian forces available to Hannibal can be estimated. Assuming that two-thirds of the Lucani and Bruttii and one-third of the Apulians and little under one third of Campanians and a fifth of the Samnites were on his side, they had zero complete Greeks and the total rebel Italian manpower was c. 150,000 men, to which must be added Hannibal's own Carthaginian army and Gallic allies. In contrast, the Romans could draw upon c. 650,000 Romans and Allies of undisputed loyalty. Of these, at 50,000 perished in Rome's great military disasters of 218–206 BC. The remaining 600,000 were roughly six times the maximum manpower Hannibal had in Italy.

But in reality, Hannibal's position was even weaker than this. Rome's Italian confederates were organised in the regular structures of the military confederation under unified Roman command. Hannibal's Italian allies, on the other hand, served in their own units and under independent command. Only the Lucani are recorded as having joined Hannibal in operations outside their own territory. The rest were solely concerned with defending their own territory against Roman counter-attacks and were unwilling to join Hannibal's operations elsewhere. During the period from 214 to 203, the Romans deployed the equivalent of at least seven consular armies (c. 140,000 men) in southern Italy year-round (and sometimes as many as ten armies – 200,000 men). Each consular army-equivalent of c. 20,000 was probably as large as Hannibal's entire "mobile" army of Carthaginians and Gauls. This massive standing force proved an insurmountable obstacle for Hannibal. The multiple Roman armies could attack Hannibal's allies at several points simultaneously, while his own mobile army (Carthaginians and Gauls) was not large enough to intervene in more than a couple of theatres at once. In addition, his mobile army's supply lines were constantly threatened along their whole length, severely restricting its operational range. All the while, Hannibal faced a slow but inexorable shrinkage of his mobile army as he was unable to fully replace his campaign losses. Reinforcements by land from the North, whether of Gauls or other Carthaginians from Spain, were successfully blocked by the Romans, most importantly when they defeated Hannibal's brother Hasdrubal's relief army at the Battle of the Metaurus (207 BC). Reinforcements by sea were severely restricted by Roman sea power (although some reinforcements did get through by sea). For these reasons, Hannibal proved unable to prevent the Romans from reducing his Italian allied city-states one by one, despite his continuing success in virtually all battlefield encounters.

Nevertheless, the Hannibalic War stretched Roman military manpower to the limit. Of their 400,000 available manpower, the Romans kept at least 200,000 men in the field, in Italy and overseas, continuously in the period 214–203 (and 240,000 in the peak year). In addition, c. 30,000 were serving in the Roman fleets at the same time. Thus, if one assumes that fresh recruits reaching military age were cancelled out by campaign losses, about 60% of the confederation's available manpower was under arms continuously. This barely left enough to tend the fields and produce the food supply. Even then, emergency measures were often needed to find enough recruits. Livy implies that, after Cannae, the minimum property qualification for legionary service was largely ignored. In addition, the normal ban on criminals, debtors and slaves serving in the legions was lifted. Twice the wealthy class were forced to contribute their slaves to man the fleets and twice boys under military age were enlisted.

== Course of the war ==
From the start, the rebels' prime target was to capture the Latin colonies. These had been deliberately located to disrupt communications between powerful tribal groups and their territories constituted some of most fertile land in the interior (which had been taken away from the tribes now in revolt).

== Roman unification of Italy ==
The granting of citizenship to Italians did not, however, end the two-class system of Roman citizens and peregrini. For the inhabitants of Rome's possessions outside Italy mostly remained non-citizens, and their numbers grew rapidly as Rome's empire expanded.

Indeed, even within the newly reconstituted top tier of the system there was a slightly camouflaged inequality, as the newly enfranchised Italians were only added to eight out of thirty-five of the Roman tribes, their effective political power thus being severely limited. This was one of the causes of residual unrest among some sections of the Italians, manifested in their marked support for the Populares during the Sullan civil wars.

== Imperial times ==
By the time of Augustus, the inhabitants of Cisalpine Gaul (northern Italy) had also been granted citizenship (and the province of Cisalpine Gaul abolished and integrated into Italia). But outside Italy, Roman citizenship remained limited, although it spread over time. It has been estimated that in the time of emperor Tiberius (ruled AD 14–37), only c. 10% of the Roman empire's 60–70 million inhabitants were citizens. Emulating the republican model of the socii, Augustus recruited roughly half his army from these "second-class citizens", into a corps known as the auxilia (literally "supports") whose role, training and equipment were the same as the legionaries', except that they provided most of the imperial army's cavalry, archers and other specialists. But, like the legionaries, the auxiliaries were full-time, long-service professionals, mainly volunteers.

Finally, in AD 212, a decree of the emperor Caracalla (the Constitutio Antoniniana) granted citizenship to all free inhabitants of the empire.
