= Formula togatorum =

The formula togatorum ("list of toga-wearers") was a schedule kept in Rome that listed the various military obligations that Rome's Italian allies were required to supply to Rome in times of war. Togati, "those who wear the toga", is not precisely equivalent to "Roman citizens", and may mean more broadly "Romanized"; in the inscriptional context in which the phrase appears, togati seems to mean Romans, allies, or Latins who are subject to conscription.

According to Polybius (3. 107. 12), in his day, Rome's allies supplied as many infantry soldiers as did Rome itself, but three times as much cavalry. Appian and Velleius Paterculus also mention allied contributions.

Toynbee supposed that the formula listed the maximum number of troops that Rome could demand. Brunt, by contrast, argued that the obligation was set at a sliding scale, and that Rome could demand so many men per year from each community for every legion that it fielded.

== Bibliography ==
- A.J. Toynbee, Hannibal's Legacy (London, 1965).
- P.A. Brunt, Italian Manpower: 225 B.C.— A.D. 14 (Oxford U.P., 1971).
