= Litra =

Coin used in ancient Greek colonies

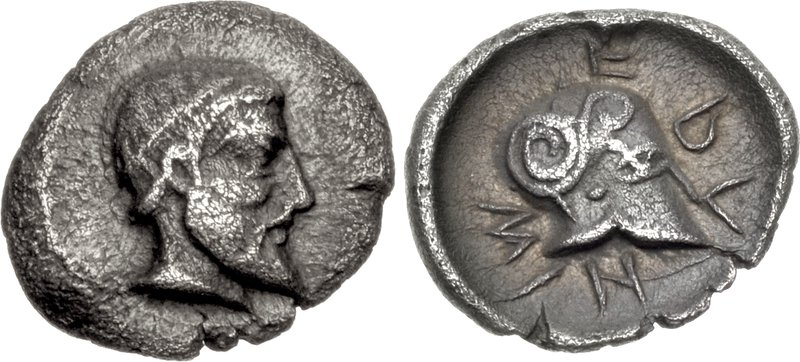
A silver litra from Sicily, c. 430 BC

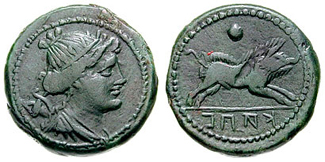
A c. 215 BC bronze onkia coin (a 1/12 subdivision of a litra) with one value-pellet above the boar. A coin worth 2/12 or 3/12 litra would have had 2 or 3 value pellets respectively.

A litra (pl.: litrae; Ancient Greek: λίτρα) was a small silver coin (or unit of measurement for other precious metals) used in the Archaic-era and early Classical colonies of ancient Greece in general and in ancient Sicily in particular. As a coin, the litra was similar in value to the obol. In silver content, the coin weighed 0.87 g (0.031 oz) and was equal to one-fifth of a drachma. As a unit of weight, the litra was one-third of a Roman libra, i.e. 109.15 g (3.850 oz).

Making small change from the silver coin, one litra could be divided into 12 bronze onkia coins (also spelled ounkia and related to the later Roman uncia). Some ancient Greek bronze coins were marked with value "pellets", which are tiny solid domed counting-dots somewhat like the pips on dice. Because of the division into 12 parts, a bronze coin marked with six pellets was worth half a litra (a hemilitron). A coin marked with three pellets was a quarter-litra (called a tetras for a fourth-part). For those accustomed to a 10-based rather than a 12-based coin system, it can be confusing that a coin marked with three units is a "quarter", but this is because three onkia is one fourth of a 12-onkia litra. A bronze coin worth one-sixth of a litra, called a hexans, often bore two value-pellets. Worth two onkia, the hexans was also called a dionkion (a two onkia unit). A five-onkia coin also appeared at times, called by numismatists a quincunx (not all ancient bronze coins with pellets/pips were such divisions of a litra; the Roman aes grave coins also used pellets).

In the 3rd-century apocryphal New Testament text known as the Acts of Thomas, Jesus sells Thomas to an Indian merchant "for three litrae of silver unstamped".

In the Talmud, the litra is a unit of measurement, the equivalent of 60 shekels, weighing 354 g (12.5 oz).
