= Quincunx (Roman coin) =

Bronze coin minted during the Roman Republic

A quincunx of Larinum
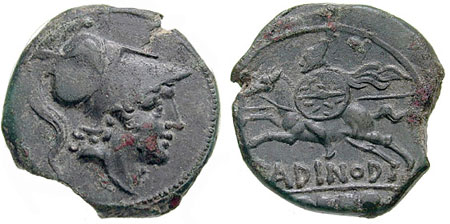
First side of the image: Bearded head of Mars, wearing Corinthian helmet
Second side of the image: [L]ADINOD, warrior on horseback galloping left; five pellets in exergue.
Circa 210–175 BC. Æ 22mm – 7.95 g.

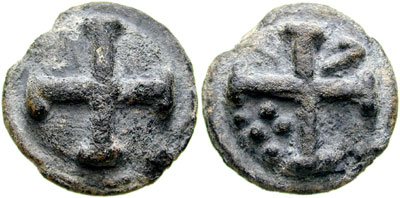
Quincunx coins

The quincunx was a bronze coin minted during the Roman Republic. It was not part of the standard coinage of the Roman monetary system. The quincunx was produced only during the Second Punic War (218 to 204 BC), by mints at Luceria (mod. Lucera), Teate (mod. Chieti), Larinum (mod. Larino), and northern Apulia. After the defeat of Cannae during the Second Punic War, a coin with the same value was minted in Capua.

The word quincunx comes from Latin quinque meaning "five" and uncia meaning "one-twelfth", since the coin was valued at five-twelfths of a bronze as (also called a libra). Alternate names for the division are quicunx and cingus.

Its value was sometimes represented by a pattern of five dots arranged at the corners and the center of a square, like the pips of a die. So, this pattern also came to be called quincunx.
