= Sylloge Nummorum Graecorum =

Project publishing collections of ancient Greek coins

Sylloge Nummorum Graecorum (SNG) is a project to publish ancient Greek coinage, founded in Great Britain by the British Academy in 1930. It was originally intended to catalogue both public and private Greek coin collections in the UK. It has gradually spread to other countries, and has now published more than 120 volumes. In 1972 the project was adopted by the Union Académique Internationale. Volumes are now published under the patronage of the International Numismatic Council. The British project has also established an online database, which includes over 25,000 coins in British collections. Though not necessarily comprehensive, it is considered a useful resource for researched Greek and Greek Imperial coinage for numismatists and historians alike at both specialist and undergraduate level.
