= Didrachm =

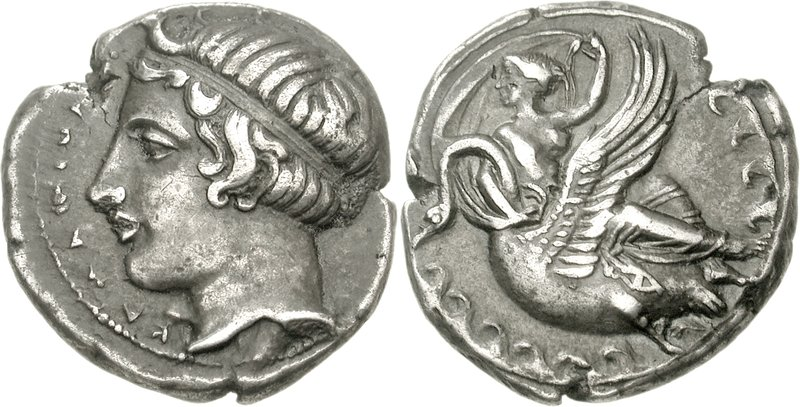
Horned head of young river-god Hipparis left, wearing taina; KAMAPINA before Nymph Kamarina, holding up her veil in her left hand, reclining right, head left, on swan swimming left; waves around.

The Didrachm was a coin used by the Greek and Romans. The coin was worth two drachma. The Romans started using the didrachm around 280 BC and stopped using it around 211 BC.

== Background ==
The denomination of the Didrachm was invented by the Greek. Early Roman silver coins were modeled after similar Greek currency. The weight of the Roman coin was also the same as Greek cities. The legend Romano distinguished the coin from Greek coins of the same period. The coin was equal to two drachma or a Jewish half shekel.

== History ==
The first didrachm was struck by Rome in around 280 BC. Didrachms were struck until the 2nd Punic War, and they were replaced by the denarius in 211 BC. Larissa's didrachm were issued in the 4th century BC, during which they displayed art of the city's mythology and the history of Thessaly.
