= Civitas foederata =

Autonomous community bound to the Roman Empire by formal treaty

A civitas foederata, meaning "allied state/community", was the most elevated type of autonomous cities and local communities under Roman rule.

Each Roman province comprised a number of communities of different status. Alongside Roman colonies or municipia, whose residents held the Roman citizenship or Latin citizenship, a province was largely formed by self-governing communities of natives (peregrini), which were distinguished according to the level of autonomy they had: the lowest were the civitates stipendariae ("tributary states"), followed by the civitates liberae ("free states"), which had been granted specific privileges.

Unlike the latter, the civitates foederatae were individually bound to Rome by formal treaty (foedus). Although they remained formally independent, the civitates foederatae in effect surrendered their foreign relation to Rome, to which they were bound by perpetual alliance. Nevertheless, the citizens of these cities enjoyed certain rights under Roman law, like the commercium and the conubium. In the Greek East, many of the Greek city-states (poleis) were formally liberated and granted some form of formal guarantee of their autonomy. As they had a long history and tradition of their own, most of these communities were content with this status, unlike in the Latin West, where, with their progressive Romanization, many communities sought a gradual advancement to the status of a municipium or even a colonia.

== Sources ==
- Eilers, Claude (2010). "Local Government, Roman". In Gagarin, Michael (ed.). The Oxford Encyclopedia of Ancient Greece and Rome. Oxford University Press. pp. 273–275. ISBN 9780195170726.
- Mousourakis, George (2007). A Legal History of Rome. Routledge. ISBN 9780415408936.

.
