= Civitas =

Roman concept of citizenry as an entity united by law

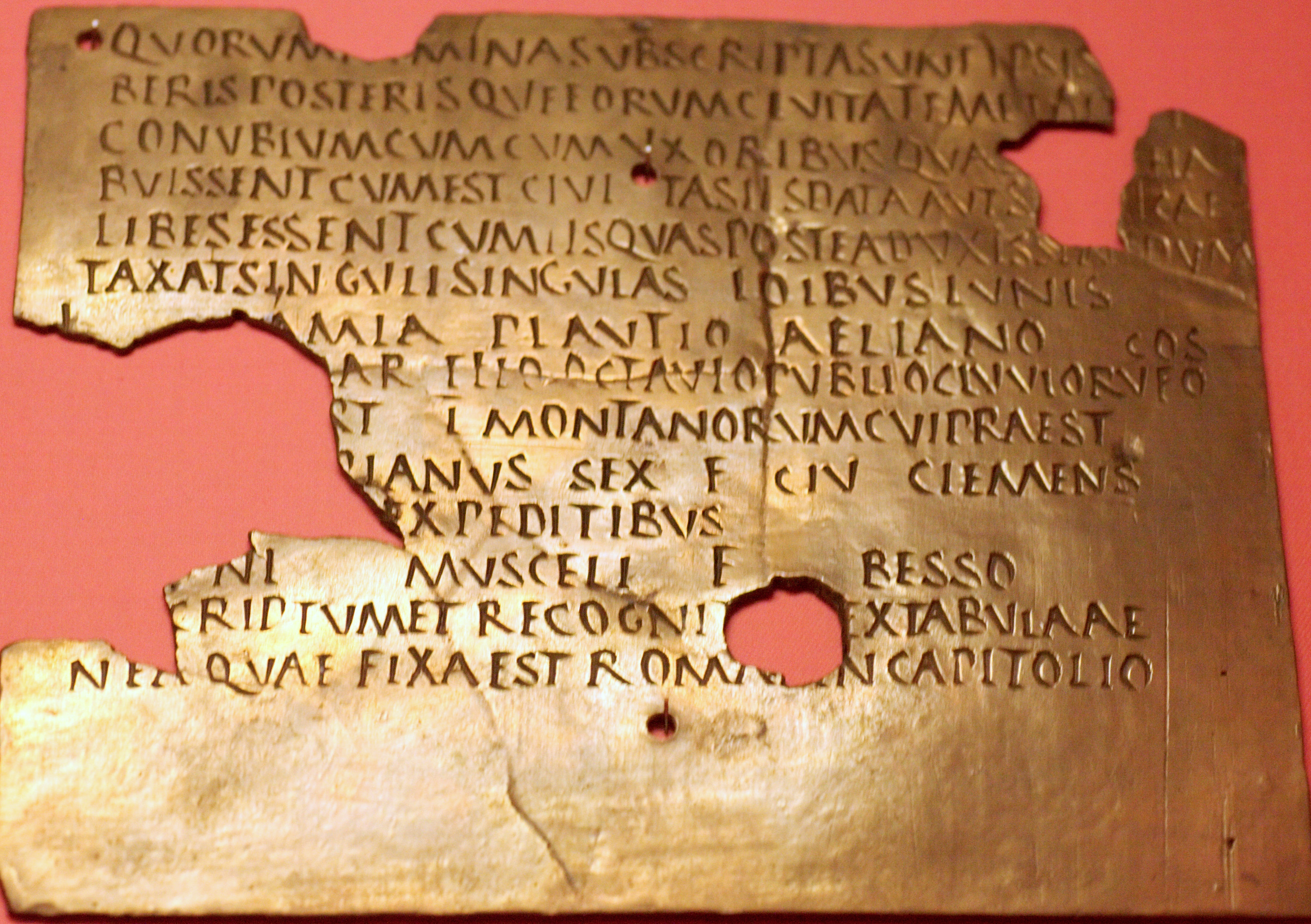
A Roman military diploma, or certificate of successful military service, granting citizenship to a retiring soldier and the dependents he had with him at the time. The key phrase is "est civitas eis data" where civitas means "citizenship".

In Ancient Rome, a civitas (Latin pronunciation: [ˈkiːwɪtaːs]; plural civitates), sometimes translated as "city", was the social body of the cives, or citizens, united by their laws, which gave them responsibilities (Latin: munera) on the one hand, and rights on the other. The agreement (concilium) has a life of its own, creating a res publica or "public entity" (synonymous with civitas), into which individuals are born or accepted, and from which they die or are ejected. The civitas is not just the collective body of all the citizens; it is the contract binding them all together, because each of them is a civis.

== Word history ==
Civitas is an abstract word formed from civis meaning citizen. Claude Nicolet traces the first word and concept for the citizen at Rome to the first known instance resulting from the synoecism of Romans and Sabines presented in the legends of the Roman Kingdom. According to Livy, the two peoples participated in a ceremony of union after which they were named Quirites after the Sabine town of Cures. The two groups became the first curiae, subordinate assemblies, from co-viria ("fellow assemblymen", where vir is "man", as only men participated in government). The Quirites were the co-viri. The two peoples had acquired one status. The Latin for the Sabine Quirites was cives, which in one analysis came from the Indo-European *kei-, "lie down" in the sense of incumbent, member of the same house. City, civic, and civil all come from this root. Two peoples were now under the same roof, so to speak.

Civitas was a popular and widely used word in ancient Rome, with reflexes in modern times. Over the centuries the usage broadened into a spectrum of meaning cited by the larger Latin dictionaries: it could mean in addition to the citizenship established by the constitution the legal city-state, or res publica, the populus of that res publica (not people as people but people as citizens), any city state either proper or state-like, even ideal, or (mainly under the empire) the physical city, or urbs. Under that last meaning some places took on the name, civitas, or incorporated it into their name, with the later civita or civida as reflexes.

== Types of civitates ==
As the empire grew, inhabitants of the outlying Roman provinces would either be classed as dediticii, meaning "capitulants", or be treated as client states with some independence guaranteed through treaties. There were three categories of autonomous native communities under Roman rule: the highest, civitates foederatae ("allied states"), were formed with formally independent and equal cities, and sealed by a common treaty (foedus); next came the civitates liberae ("free cities"), which indicated communities that had been granted specific privileges by Rome, often in the form of tax immunity (hence liberae et immunes); the final, and by far most common group, were the civitates stipendariae ("tributary states"), which while retaining their internal legal autonomy were obliged to pay tax.

Prestigious and economically important settlements such as Massilia and Messana are examples of occupied regions granted semi-autonomy during the Roman Republic. The island of Malta was granted this status as a reward for loyalty to Rome during the Second Punic War. The new Romanised urban settlements of these client tribes were also called civitates and were usually re-founded close to the site of an old, pre-Roman capital. At Cirencester, for example, the Romans made use of the army base that originally oversaw the nearby tribal oppidum to create a civitas.

During the later empire, the term was applied not only to friendly native tribes and their towns but also to local government divisions in peaceful provinces that carried out civil administration. Land destined to become a civitas was officially divided up, some being granted to the locals and some being owned by the civil government. A basic street grid would be surveyed in but the development of the civitas from there was left to the inhabitants although occasional imperial grants for new public buildings would be made.

Tacitus describes how the Romano-Britons embraced the new urban centres: "They spoke of such novelties as 'civilisation', when this was really only a feature of their slavery." (Agricola, 21)

The civitates differed from the less well-planned vici that grew up haphazardly around military garrisons; coloniae, which were settlements of retired troops; and municipia, formal political entities created from existing settlements. The civitates were regional market towns complete with a basilica and forum complex providing an administrative and economic focus. Civitates had a primary purpose of stimulating the local economy in order to raise taxes and produce raw materials. All this activity was administered by an ordo or curia, a civitas council consisting of men of sufficient social rank to be able to stand for public office.

Defensive measures were limited at the civitates, rarely more than palisaded earthworks in times of trouble, if even that. Towards the end of the empire, the civitates' own local militias, led by a decurion, likely served as the only defensive force in outlying Romanised areas threatened by barbarians. There is evidence that some civitates maintained some degree of Romanisation and served as population centres beyond the official Roman withdrawal, albeit with limited resources.

Certain civitates groups survived as distinct tribal groupings even beyond the fall of the Roman Empire, particularly in Britain and northern Spain.

== See also ==
- Civitas sine suffragio
- Quirites
- Forum of Vieux-la-Romaine
- Anderitum (Gaul)
