= Local government in ancient Rome =

Governance in ancient Rome

The Romans used provincial and local governments to govern conquered territories without having to rule them directly.

Although Rome ruled a vast empire, it needed strikingly few imperial officials to run it. This relatively light ruling administrative overview was made possible by the tendency to leave to local government much administrative business and to private enterprise many of the tasks associated with governments in the modern world. Especially important within this system was the city, where the magistrates, councils, and assemblies of urban centers governed themselves and areas of the countryside around them. These cities could vary enormously both in population and territory from the tiny Greek poleis of several hundred citizens to the great metropoleis such as Alexandria or Antioch. Despite these differences, these cities shared certain governmental structures and were free, in varying degrees depending on the community’s status, to manage their own affairs.

There were also important differences in the statuses of communities, which were arranged in a hierarchy of prestige, with Roman coloniae at the top, followed by municipia (some of which had full citizen rights, others, the Latin rights), and cities that had no citizenship rights at all. Cities in this last group could be tribute-paying cities (civitates), free cities (civitates liberae), and free cities with treaties (civitates liberae et foederatae)

== Coloniae ==
Romans began founding coloniae in conquered territory for security, sending their own citizens out from Rome. In the earliest period, colonies fell into two classes, coloniae civium Romanorum ("colonies of Roman citizens") and coloniae Latinorum ("colonies of Latins"), depending on their respective political rights. At first, the establishment of a colony required that a law be passed in Rome in the popular assembly. During the civil discord of the late Republic and Second Triumvirate, colonies were founded on the whim of dynasts such as Sulla and Julius Caesar without such a law.

Colonies were modelled closely on the Roman constitution, with roles being defined for magistrates, council, and assemblies. Colonists enjoyed full Roman citizenship and were thus extensions of Rome itself. Beginning in 118 BC in Gallia Narbonensis, colonies began to be established in Rome's provinces, and from this point onwards coloniae were especially used for settling demobilized soldiers and in programs of agrarian reform.

== Municipia ==
The second most prestigious class of cities was the municipium (plural municipia). Municipia had originally been communities of non-citizens among Rome's Italic allies. Following the Social War, Roman citizenship was awarded to all Italy, with the result that a municipium was effectively now a community of citizens.

The category was also used in the provinces to describe cities that used Roman law but were not colonies.

== See also ==
- Curiales
- Duumviri

== Sources ==
- Abbott, F.F. and A.C. Johnson, Municipal Administration in the Roman Empire (Princeton: Princeton U.P., 1926).
- Burton, G. P. ‘Proconsuls, Assizes, and the Administration of Justice under the Empire’, Journal of Roman Studies 65 (1975), 92-106.
- Lintott, A. W. Imperium Romanum: Politics and Administration (London and New York: Routledge, 1993).
- Millar, F. ‘Italy and the Roman Empire: Augustus to Constantine’, Phoenix 40 (1986), 295-318.
