= Civitas stipendaria =

Most common form of local community under Ancient Roman rule

A civitas stipendaria or stipendiaria, meaning "tributary state/community", was the lowest and most common type of towns and local communities under Roman rule.

Each Roman province comprised a number of communities of different status. Alongside Roman colonies or municipia, whose residents held the Roman citizenship or Latin citizenship, a province was largely formed by self-governing communities of natives (peregrini), which were distinguished according to the level of autonomy they had: the civitates stipendariae were the lowest grade, after the civitates foederatae ("allied states") which were bound to Rome by formal treaty (foedus), and the civitates liberae ("free states"), which were granted specific privileges. The civitates stipendariae were by far the most common of the three—for example, in 70 BC in Sicily there were 65 such cities, as opposed to only five civitates liberae and two foederatae—and furnished the bulk of a province's revenue.

== Sources ==
- Eilers, Claude (2010). "Local Government, Roman". In Gagarin, Michael (ed.). The Oxford Encyclopedia of Ancient Greece and Rome. Oxford University Press. pp. 273–275. ISBN 9780195170726.
- Mousourakis, George (2007). A Legal History of Rome. Routledge. ISBN 9780415408936.
