= Peregrinus (Roman) =

Provincial inhabitant of the Roman Empire

In the early Roman Empire, from 30 BC to AD 212, a peregrinus (Latin: [pɛrɛˈɡriːnʊs]) was a free provincial subject of the Empire who was not a Roman citizen. Peregrini constituted the vast majority of the Empire's inhabitants in the 1st and 2nd centuries AD. In AD 212, all free inhabitants of the Empire were granted citizenship by the Constitutio Antoniniana, with the exception of the dediticii, people who had become subject to Rome through surrender in war, and freed slaves.

The Latin peregrinus "foreigner, one from abroad" is related to the Latin adverb peregre "abroad", composed of per- "through" and an assimilated form of ager "field, country", i.e., "over the lands"; the -e is an adverbial suffix. During the Roman Republic, the term peregrinus simply denoted any person who did not hold Roman citizenship, full or partial, whether that person was under Roman rule or not. Technically, this remained the case during the Imperial era, but in practice the term became limited to subjects of the Empire, with inhabitants of regions outside the Empire's borders denoted barbari (barbarians).

== Numbers ==
In the 1st and 2nd centuries, the vast majority (80–90%) of the empire's inhabitants were peregrini. By 49 BC, all Italians were Roman citizens. (Note: The inhabitants of Italy south of the Arno-Rubicon line (i.e. excluding modern northern Italy, then known as Cisalpine Gaul and not considered part of Italy proper) were granted Roman citizenship after the Social War of 91–88 BC. The inhabitants of Cisalpine Gaul were granted Roman citizenship by a decree of Roman dictator-for-life Julius Caesar in 49 BC and incorporated into Italy under the Second Triumvirate in 43/42 BC.) Outside Italy, those provinces with the most intensive Roman colonisation over the approximately two centuries of Roman rule probably had a Roman citizen majority by the end of Augustus' reign: Gallia Narbonensis (southern France), Hispania Baetica (Andalusia, Spain) and Africa proconsularis (Tunisia). This could explain the closer similarity of the lexicon of the Iberian, Italian and Occitan languages as compared to French and other oïl languages.

In frontier provinces, the proportion of citizens would have been far smaller. For example, one estimate puts Roman citizens in Britain c. AD 100 at about 50,000, less than 3% of the total provincial population of c. 1.7 million. In the empire as a whole, we know there were just over 6 million Roman citizens in AD 47, the last quinquennial Roman census return extant. This was just 9% of a total imperial population generally estimated at c. 70 million at that time. (Note: This percentage calculation is based on the assumption that the 6 million figure includes the women and children of Roman citizens. Unfortunately, this is not certain: technically, only adult (i.e. over 14 years of age) males were citizens. However, there is a tenfold increase in citizens between the censuses of 114 BC and of 28 BC: this is regarded by demographers as an implausible progression, leading to the suggestion that the basis of recording was changed in the interval, with registration of the women and children of Roman citizens in the later census. If, on the other hand, the 6 million refers only to adult males, then the total citizen community including women and children would have been 15–20 million i.e. 20–30% of the total population. However, this is highly unlikely as it would imply that the population density of Italy was far higher than in other provinces. This may have been true if Italy is compared with Rhine/Danube frontier provinces, but was almost certainly not true compared with the Eastern provinces. Then again, some estimates put the total imperial population as high as 100 million at this time, in which case the "high count" of citizens would represent 15–20% of the total population. In conclusion, it is unlikely that citizens exceeded 20% of the total in AD 47, and probable that they were less than 10%.))

== Social status ==
Peregrini were accorded only the basic rights of the ius gentium ("law of peoples"), a sort of international law derived from the commercial law developed by Greek city-states, that was used by the Romans to regulate relations between citizens and non-citizens. But the ius gentium did not confer many of the rights and protections of the ius civile ("law of citizens" i.e. what we call Roman law).

In the sphere of criminal law, there was no law to prevent the torture of peregrini during official interrogations. Peregrini were subject to de plano (summary) justice, including execution, at the discretion of the legatus Augusti (provincial governor). In theory at least, Roman citizens could not be tortured and could insist on being tried by a full hearing of the governor's assize court i.e. court held in rotation at different locations. This would involve the governor acting as judge, advised by a consilium ("council") of senior officials, as well as the right of the defendant to employ legal counsel. Roman citizens also enjoyed the important safeguard (against possible malpractice by the governor), of the right to appeal any criminal sentence, especially a death sentence, directly to the emperor himself. (Note: In theory, every Roman citizen had a right to be tried in Rome by a iudicium publicum, a criminal court with a jury. This was obviously impractical for citizens residing in distant provinces and was replaced by appeal to the emperor. Two examples illustrate the preferential treatment accorded to Roman citizens in criminal matters: (1) St Paul the Apostle, who although Jewish, was a Roman citizen by birth. In AD 60 he was rescued by Roman soldiers (clearly auxiliaries) from a Jewish mob at the Temple of Jerusalem that accused him of blasphemy and were on the point of lynching him. Taken to the Roman fort, the commander of the unit ordered him to be interrogated under the lash until he confessed what he had done to upset the Jews. But when Paul declared himself a Roman citizen, the flogging was aborted and his chains removed. What is very revealing is the evident fear of the peregrini soldiers when they realised that they had roughly handled a Roman citizen. He was then sent under escort to the governor of Judaea in Caesarea. Eventually, he was sent to Rome for his case to be heard by the emperor. (2) An incident in c. AD 110 mentioned in a letter to the emperor Trajan by Pliny the Younger, who was governor of Bithynia at the time. A number of provincials, some of whom were Roman citizens, were accused of being Christians. The peregrini accused who refused to recant (by paying homage to the emperor's image) were summarily executed. Those who were Roman citizens, on the other hand, were sent to Rome for judgement. N.B. As Pliny implies in his letter, until the rule of emperor Septimius Severus (197–211), there was no formal statute making it a crime to belong to the Christian church per se. But it was a capital offence of treason (maiestas) for a peregrinus to refuse to worship the emperor's image, which Christians invariably did, because of their belief in one god. Therefore, the Roman authorities regarded membership of the Christian church as treasonous by extension.)

As regards civil law, with the exception of capital crimes, peregrini were subject to the customary laws and courts of their civitas (an administrative circumscription, similar to a county, based on the pre-Roman tribal territories). Cases involving Roman citizens, on the other hand, were adjudicated by the governor's assize court, according to the elaborate rules of Roman civil law. This gave citizens a substantial advantage in disputes with peregrini, especially over land, as Roman law would always prevail over local customary law if there was a conflict. Furthermore, the governor's verdicts were often swayed by the social status of the parties (and often by bribery) rather than by jurisprudence.

In the fiscal sphere, peregrini were subject to direct taxes (tributum): they were obliged to pay an annual poll tax (tributum capitis), an important source of imperial revenue. Roman citizens were exempt from the poll tax. As would be expected in an agricultural economy, by far the most important revenue source was the tax on land (tributum soli), payable on most provincial land. Again, land in Italy was exempt as was, probably, land owned by Roman colonies (coloniae) outside Italy.

In the military sphere, peregrini were excluded from service in the legions, and could only enlist in the less prestigious auxiliary regiments; at the end of an auxiliary's service (a 25-year term), he and his children were granted citizenship.

In the social sphere, peregrini did not possess the right of connubium ("inter-marriage"): i.e. they could not legally marry a Roman citizen: thus any children from a mixed union were illegitimate and could not inherit citizenship (or property). In addition, peregrini could not, unless they were auxiliary servicemen, designate heirs under Roman law. On their death, therefore, they were legally intestate and their assets became the property of the state.

== Local authorities ==
Each province of the empire was divided into three types of local authority: coloniae (Roman colonies, founded by retired legionary veterans), municipia (cities with "Latin Rights", a sort of half-citizenship) and civitates peregrinae, the local authorities of the peregrini.

Civitates peregrinae were based on the territories of pre-Roman city-states (in the Mediterranean) or indigenous tribes (in the northwestern European and Danubian provinces), minus lands confiscated by the Romans after the conquest of the province to provide land for legionary veterans or to become imperial estates. These civitates were grouped into three categories, according to their status: civitates foederatae, civitates liberae, and civitates stipendariae.

Although the provincial governor had absolute power to intervene in civitas affairs, in practice civitates were largely autonomous, in part because the governor operated with a minimal bureaucracy and simply did not have the resources for detailed micro-management of the civitates. Provided that the civitates collected and delivered their assessed annual tributum (poll and land taxes) and carried out required services such as maintaining trunk Roman roads that crossed their territory, they were largely left to run their own affairs by the central provincial administration.

The civitates peregrinae were often ruled by the descendants of the aristocracies that dominated them when they were independent entities in the pre-conquest era, although many of these may have suffered severe diminution of their lands during the invasion period. These elites would dominate the civitas council and executive magistracies, which would be based on traditional institutions. They would decide disputes according to tribal customary law. If the chief town of a civitas was granted municipium status, the elected leaders of the civitas, and, later, the entire council (as many as 100 men), were automatically granted citizenship.

The Romans counted on the native elites to keep their civitates orderly and submissive. They ensured the loyalty of those elites by substantial favours: grants of land, citizenship and even enrollment in the highest class in Roman society, the senatorial order, for those who met the property threshold. These privileges would further entrench the wealth and power of native aristocracies, at the expense of the mass of their fellow peregrini.

== Land ownership ==
The Roman Empire was overwhelmingly an agricultural economy: over 80% of the population lived and worked on the land. Therefore, rights over land use and product were the most important determinant of wealth. Roman conquest and rule probably led to a major downgrading of the economic position of the average peregrinus peasant, to the advantage of the Roman state, Roman landowners and loyal native elites. The Roman Empire was a society with enormous disparities in wealth, with the senatorial order owning a significant proportion of all land in the empire in the form of vast latifundia ("large estates"), often in several provinces e.g. Pliny the Younger's statement in one of his letters that at the time of Nero (r.54–68), half of all land in Africa proconsularis (Tunisia) was owned by just 6 private landlords. Indeed, the senatorial order, which was hereditary, was itself partly defined by wealth, as any outsider wishing to join it had to meet a very high property qualification (250,000 denarii).

Under Roman law, lands formerly belonging to an unconditionally surrendering people (dediticii) became the property of the Roman state. A proportion of such land would be assigned to Roman colonists. Some would be sold off to big Roman landowners in order to raise money for the imperial treasury.

Some would be retained as ager publicus (state-owned land), which in practice were managed as imperial estates. The rest would be returned to the civitas that originally owned it, but not necessarily returned to its previous ownership structure. Much land may have been confiscated from members of those native elites who opposed the Roman invaders, and, conversely, granted to those who supported them. The latter may also have been granted land that may once have been communal.

The proportion of land in each province confiscated by the Romans after conquest is unknown. But there are a few clues. Egypt is by far the best-documented province due to the survival of papyri in the dry conditions. There, it appears that probably a third of land was ager publicus. From the evidence available one can conclude that, between imperial estates, land assigned to coloniae, and land sold to Roman private landowners, a province's peregrini may have lost ownership of over half their land as a result of the Roman conquest. Roman colonists would routinely help themselves to the best land.

Little is known about the pattern of land ownership before the Roman conquest, but there is no doubt that it radically changed after the Roman conquest. In particular, many free peasants who had farmed the same plots for generations (i.e. were owners under tribal customary law) would have found themselves reduced to tenants, obliged to pay rent to absentee Roman landlords or to the agents of the procurator, the chief financial officer of the province, if their land was now part of an imperial estate. Even where their new landlord was a local tribal aristocrat, the free peasant may have been worse off, obliged to pay rent for land which he might previously have farmed for free, or pay fees to graze his herds on pastures which might previously have been communal.

== Enfranchisement ==
The proportion of Roman citizens would have grown steadily over time. Emperors occasionally granted citizenship en bloc to entire cities, tribes or provinces e.g. emperor Otho's grant to the Lingones civitas in Gaul AD 69 or to whole auxiliary regiments for exceptional service.

Peregrini could also acquire citizenship individually, either through service in the auxilia for the minimum 25-year term, or by special grant of the emperor for merit or status. The key person in the grant of citizenship to individuals was the provincial governor: although citizenship awards could only be made by the emperor, the latter would generally act on the recommendation of his governors, as is clear from the letters of Pliny the Younger. As governor of Bithynia, Pliny successfully lobbied his boss, the emperor Trajan (r.98–117), to grant citizenship to a number of provincials who were Pliny's friends or assistants.

In addition, bribery of governors, or other high officials, was undoubtedly a much-used route for wealthy peregrini to gain citizenship. This was the case of the commander of the Roman auxiliaries who arrested St Paul the Apostle in AD 60. He confessed to Paul: "I became a Roman citizen by paying a large amount of money." Inhabitants of cities that were granted municipium status (as were many capital cities of civitates peregrinae) acquired Latin rights, which included connubium, the right to marry a Roman citizen. The children of such a union would inherit citizenship, providing it was the father who held citizenship.

=== Constitutio Antoniniana (212 AD) ===
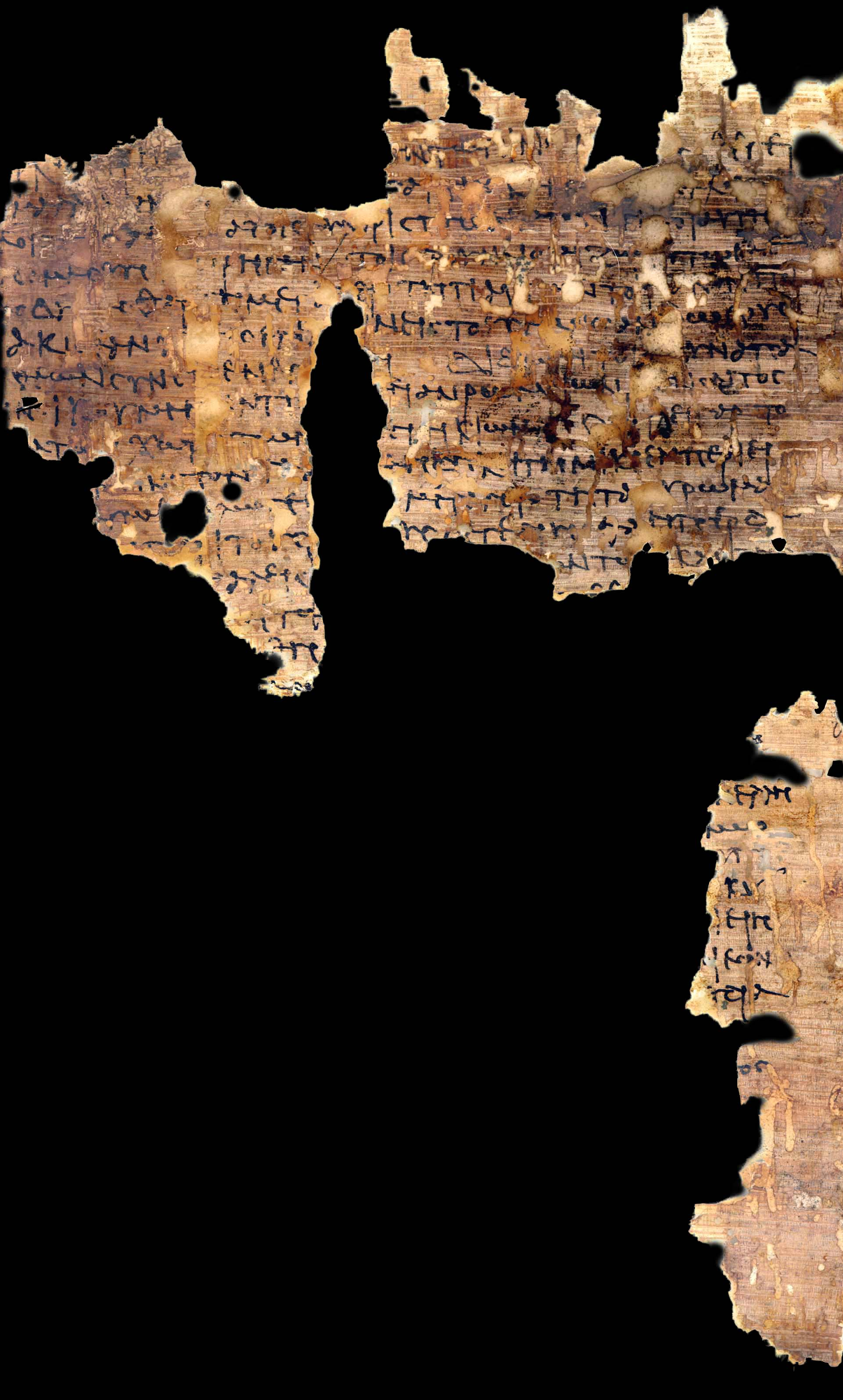
215 papyrus containing fragments of the Constitutio Antoniniana

In AD 212, the constitutio Antoniniana (Antonine decree) issued by Emperor Caracalla (ruled 211–217) granted Roman citizenship to all free subjects of the Empire, with the exception of the dediticii, people who had become subject to Rome through surrender in war, and freed slaves.

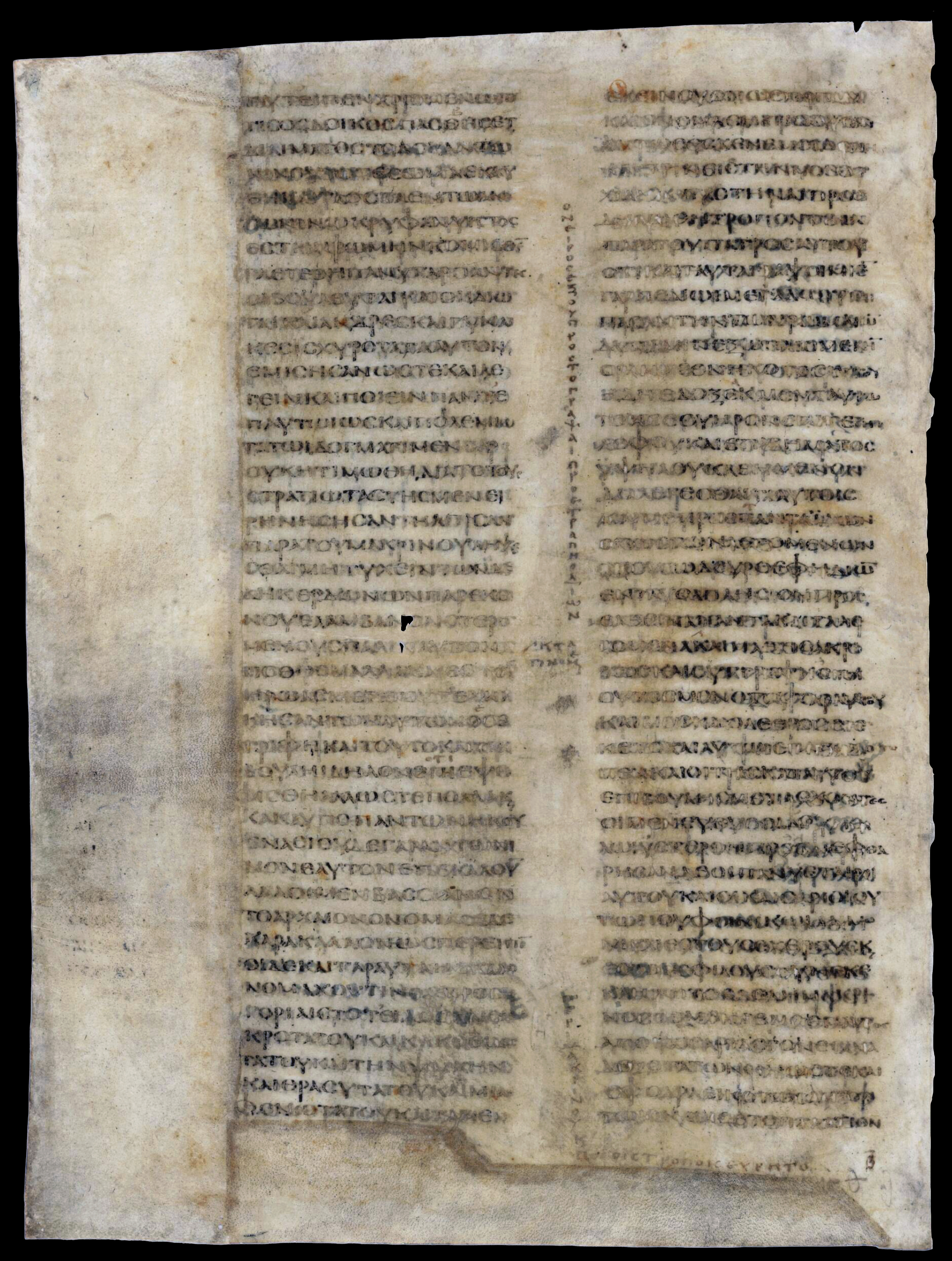
Excerpt speaking about the Constitutio Antoniniana from a 5th-century manuscript of Cassius Dio's Roman history

The contemporary historian Dio Cassius ascribes a financial motive to Caracalla's decision. He suggests that Caracalla wanted to make the peregrini subject to two indirect taxes that applied only to Roman citizens: the 5% levies on inheritances and on the manumission of slaves (both of which Caracalla increased to 10% for good measure).

But these taxes would probably have been outweighed by the loss of the annual poll tax previously paid by peregrini, from which as Roman citizens they would now be exempt. It seems unlikely that the imperial government could have foregone this revenue: it is therefore almost certain that the Antonine decree was accompanied by a further decree ending Roman citizens' exemption from direct taxes. In any case, citizens were certainly paying the poll tax in the time of Emperor Diocletian (r. 282–305).

In this way the Antonine decree would indeed have greatly increased the imperial tax base, primarily by obliging Roman citizens (by then perhaps 20–30% of the population) to pay direct taxes: the poll tax and, in the case of owners of Italian land and Roman coloniae, the land tax.

== See also ==
- Roman citizen
- Pilgrim – from the Latin peregrinus
