= Constitutio Antoniniana =

Edict issued by Roman Emperor Caracalla (212)

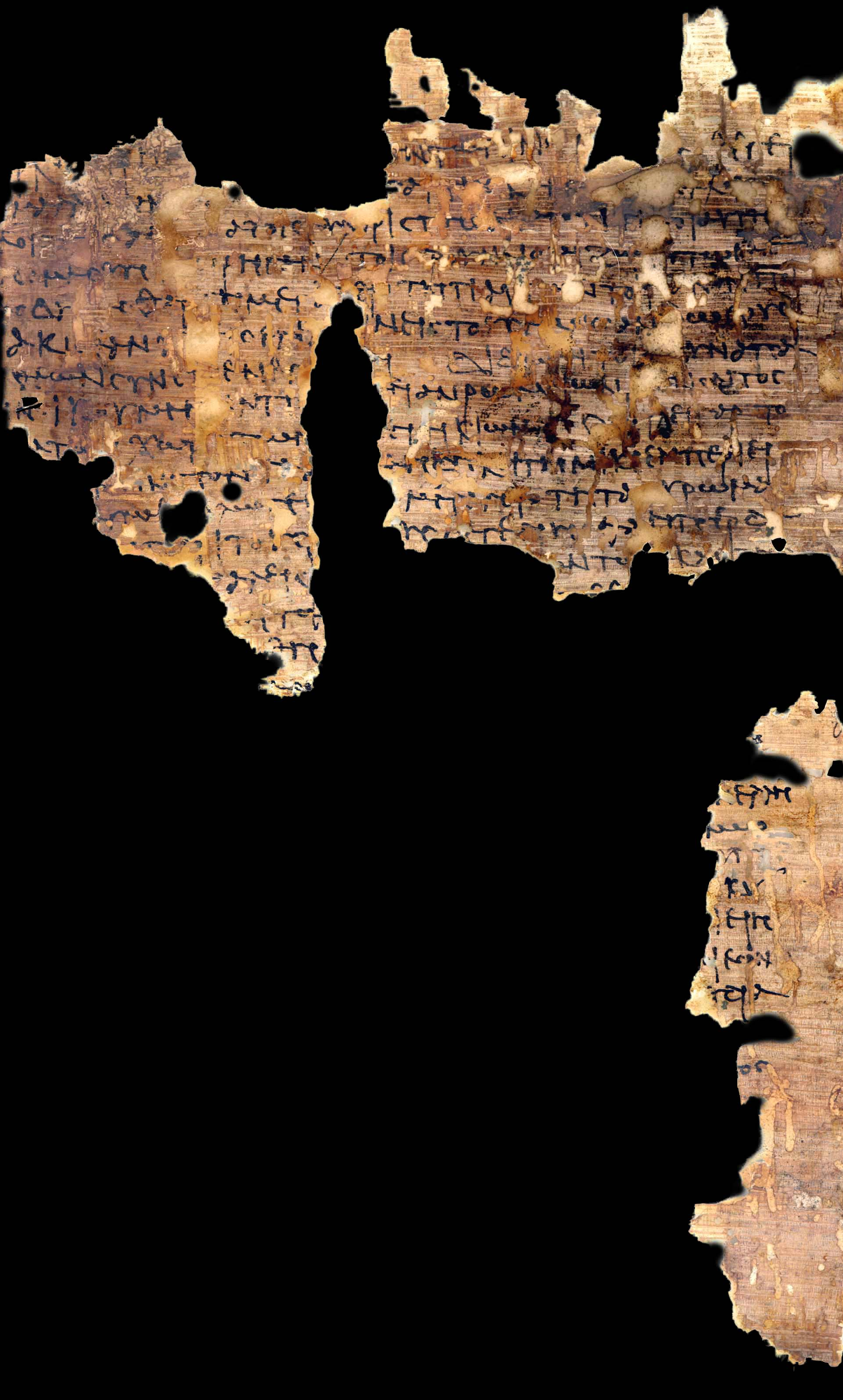
215 papyrus containing fragments of the Constitutio Antoniniana

The Constitutio Antoniniana (Latin for "Constitution [or Edict] of Antoninus"), also called the Edict of Caracalla or the Antonine Constitution, was an edict issued in AD 212 by the Roman emperor Caracalla. It declared that all free men in the Roman Empire were to be given full Roman citizenship (and by extension all free women in the Empire were to be given the same rights as Roman women, such as the jus trium liberorum).

Before AD 212, full Roman citizenship was mostly only held by inhabitants of Roman Italy. Colonies of Romans established in the provinces, Romans (or their descendants) living in provinces, the inhabitants of various cities throughout the Empire, and small numbers of local nobles (such as kings of client countries) also held full citizenship. Provincials, on the other hand, were usually non-citizens, although some held the Latin rights. Veterans of the Auxilia were also granted Roman citizenship on discharge. Being a Roman citizen remained a well sought-after status until 212.

As a result, vast numbers of new citizens assumed the nomen Aurelius, in honour of their patron (whose full name was Marcus Aurelius Antoninus), including several emperors: seven of the eleven emperors between Gallienus and Diocletian (Claudius Gothicus, Quintillus, Probus, Carus, Carinus, Numerian and Maximian) bore the name Marcus Aurelius.

== Dediticii ==
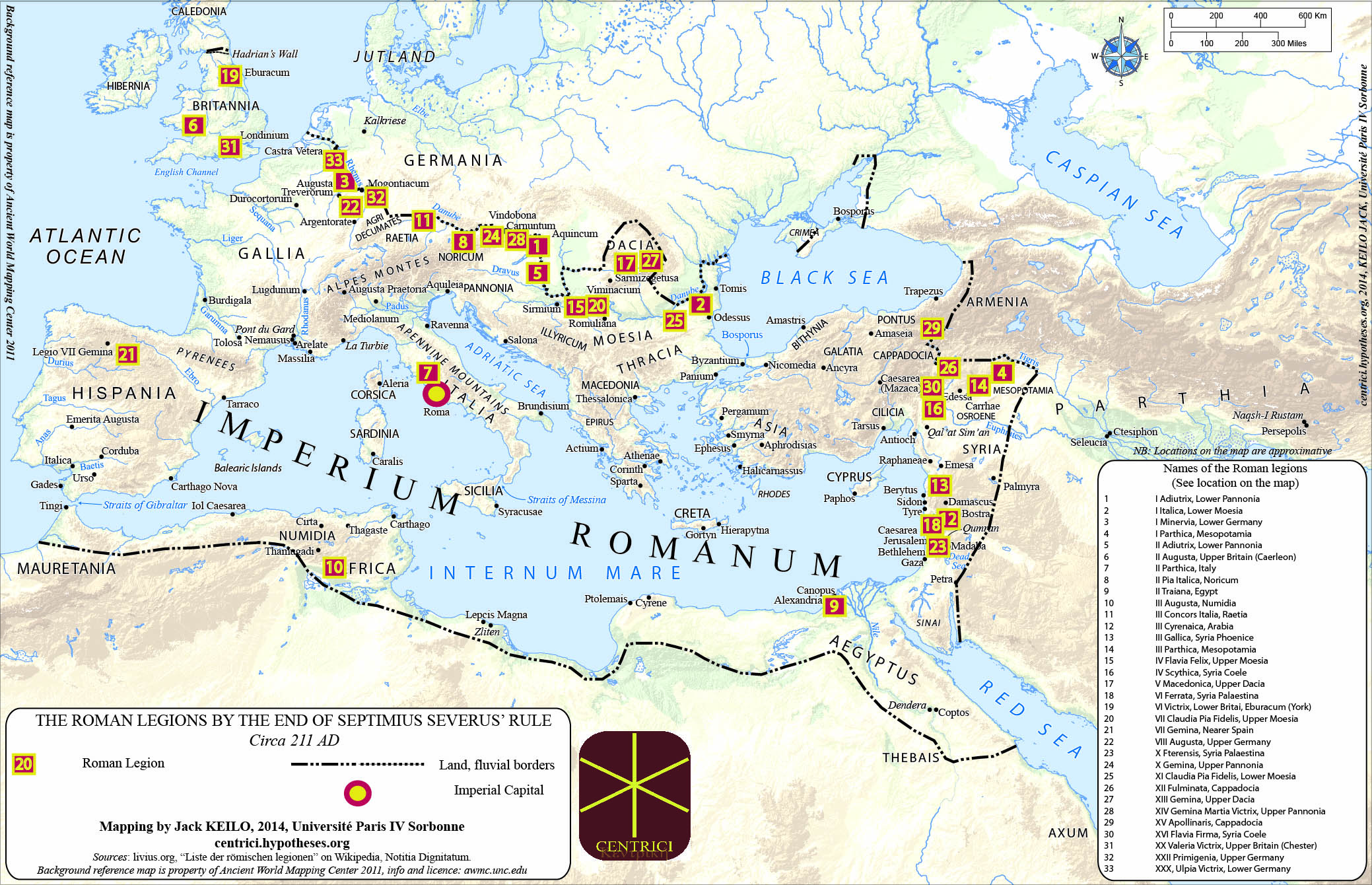
The Roman empire around 211.

The one exclusion to the universal grant occurs in a vexed passage referring to dediticii, a class of technically free people who lacked either full Roman citizenship or Latin rights. In the Imperial era, there were two categories of dediticii: the peregrini dediticii ("foreigners under treaty") who had surrendered and former slaves who were designated libertini qui dediticiorum numero sunt, freedmen who were counted among the dediticii because of a penal status that denied them the citizenship usually bestowed with manumission. The exclusion is most often taken to refer to the former slaves who had been treated as criminals by their master but for whatever reason were freed from ownership.

== Analysis ==
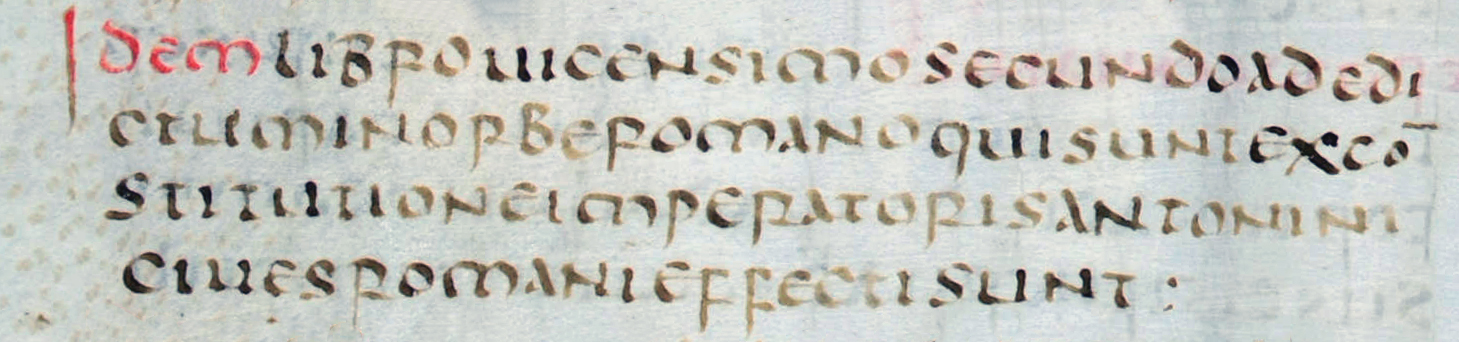
Excerpt from the 6th-century Littera Florentina manuscript containing Digest 1.5.17

The Roman jurist Ulpian (c. 170 – 223) states in the Digest: "All persons throughout the Roman world were made Roman citizens by an edict of the Emperor Antoninus Caracalla" (D. 1.5.17).

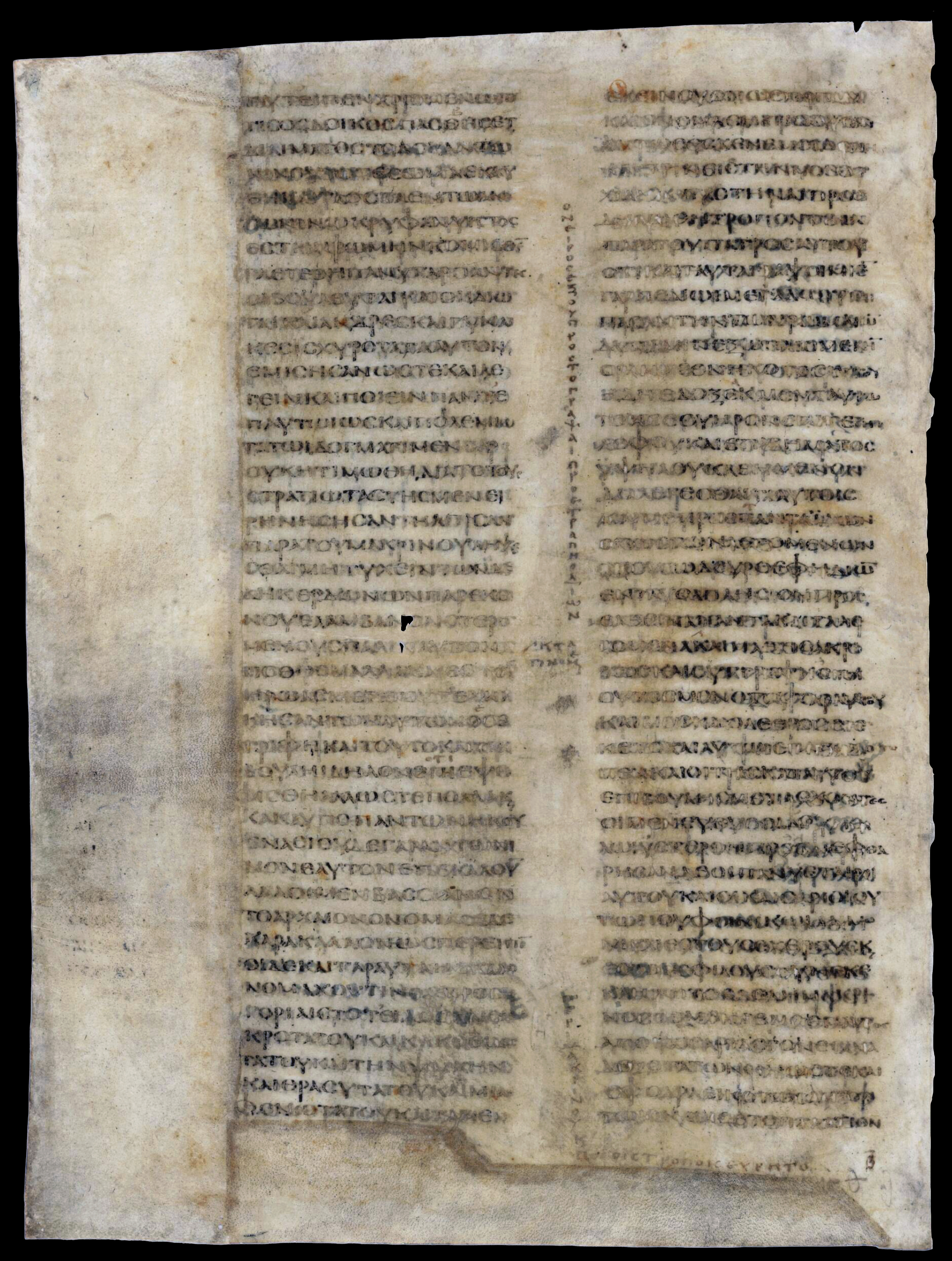
Excerpt speaking about the Constitutio Antoniniana from a 5th-century manuscript of Cassius Dio's Roman history

The context of the decree is still subject to discussion. According to historian and politician Cassius Dio (c. AD 155 – c. AD 235), the main reason Caracalla passed the law was to increase the number of people available to tax. In the words of Cassius Dio: "This was the reason why he made all the people in his empire Roman citizens; nominally he was honoring them, but his real purpose was to increase his revenues by this means, in as much as aliens did not have to pay most of these taxes." However, few of those that gained citizenship were wealthy, and while it is true that Rome was in a difficult financial situation, it is thought that this could not have been the sole purpose of the edict. Cassius Dio generally saw Caracalla as a bad, contemptible emperor.

Another goal may have been to increase the number of men able to serve in the legions, as only full citizens could serve as legionaries in the Roman army. In scholarly interpretations that agree with a model of moral degeneration as the reason for the fall of the Roman Empire, most famously the model followed by British historian Edward Gibbon, the edict came at a cost to the auxiliaries, which primarily consisted of non-citizen men.

In the analyses of more recent scholars, the Constitutio Antoniniana marks a major milestone in the provincialisation of Roman law, meaning that the gap between private law in the provinces and private law in Italia narrowed. This is because, in granting citizenship to all men in the provinces, much private law had to be re-written to conform with the law that applied to Roman citizens in Rome. To these scholars, it therefore also marks the beginning of a process by which imperial constitutions became the primary source of Roman law. However, a great deal of provincial law at variance with codified Roman law still held in the Roman provinces, as papyri from Egypt amply shows.

Mary Beard distinguishes the history of ancient Rome up until 212 to be different to the era that follows, "effectively a new state masquerading under an old name". Anthony Kaldellis says Rome went from an empire to a world and this decision would later underpin the enforcement of uniform religious belief.

== See also ==
- Constitution (Roman law)
- Peregrinus (Roman)
