= Volksrecht =

Volksrecht (popular law) and Provinzialrecht (provincial law) are terms used to describe the legal practices of the Roman provinces which operated in parallel to, or at variance with, codified Roman law. Such practices are manifest in the inscriptions and papyri of the Roman provinces, and the legal rescripta these provincials requested from the Roman imperial core. Egyptian papyri are a rich source of such practices.

The former term was coined by Ludwig Mitteis in his path-breaking Reichsrecht und Volksrecht in den östlichen Provinzen (Roman Law and Popular Law in the Eastern Provinces, 1891). Mitteis demonstrated that the Constitutio Antoniniana, which made all free men Roman citizens in 212 AD, did not cause the new Roman citizens to abandon their indigenous legal practices.

There was an extent to the Romans tolerated customary law as a supplement to Roman law (as is evidenced in the cities of Caesarea and Ascalon). However, there was no toleration of the law that was at variance with it, as Justinian's suppression of provincial law shows. Some of the practice of Volksrecht among semi-Romanized provincials may have been unintentional. Patricia Crone describes the situation in the Roman Near East as follows:

[T]here is nothing to suggest that the provincials wished to defy the law of the land. Most of them were undoubtedly quite unaware that much of what they practised was Volksrecht rather than Reichsrecht [sc. Roman law]. Thus the Nessanites, who bore names such as Flavius Valens and Flavius al-Ubayy, who toiled over Greek-Latin glossaries with a view to reading Virgil in the original, and who explicitly stated that one legal transaction of theirs was to be regulated in accordance with 'the Imperial Decree', surely did not know that their transactions were not in fact always conducted in accordance with the emperor's law.

Volksrecht is not to be confused with vulgar law, a term used to refer to local evolutions from (and simplifications of) Roman legal institutions.
