= Commercium (Roman) =

In ancient Roman law, commercium or ius commercii was a privilege granted to a non-citizen (peregrinus) or a holder of Latin rights to acquire property, make contracts, and trade in the same ways as a Roman citizen. The jurist Ulpian explained commercium as "the right of buying and selling reciprocally" (commercium est emendi vendendique invicem ius).

The exclusive right to own certain forms of property and to convey ownership of that property (mancipatio) was one of the defining aspects of early Roman citizenship. But as early as 493 BC, a right of commerce was recognized with the twenty-nine members of the Latin League, neighboring communities in Latium. A grant of commercium allowed Latins and certain peregrini to trade in res mancipi, forms of property privileged in the rural economy of early Rome that included agricultural slaves, certain farmland within the Italian peninsula, and farm animals. No special grant of commercial rights was needed for regular trade (traditio) that did not involve res mancipi.

== See also ==
- res extra commercium, things excluded from trade and ownership
