= Res extra commercium =

Roman law principle

Res extra commercium (lat. "a thing outside commerce") is a doctrine originating in Roman law, holding that certain things may not be the object of private rights, and are therefore insusceptible to being traded. The doctrine encompasses entities such as humans, public areas, organs, citizenship, and prostitution, and is an exception to the general principle of freedom of contract.

The doctrine can also refer to areas beyond national borders, such as space and the seabed: "these regions are subject to a common freedom of exploitation without exercising national sovereignty." If the world community is conceived as made up "of sovereign, territorial states ... [the implication is] that the space between these states is res extra commercium, a space that, because of its position and function within this community, is disassociated from the full package of rights to possession, exclusion, and alienation that normally may be claimed by holders of property."

== Ancient Rome ==
In ancient Roman law, res cuius commercium non est ("a thing for which there is no commercium") is the principle that certain kinds of things cannot legally be the object of trade between private individuals. Res extra commercium is the modern Latin expression of this principle. There are two major categories of res extra commercium among the Romans: res communes omnium, things common to all, and res divini iuris, things in the realm of divine law.

Res communes omnium were defined in the juristic Digest as things which "by natural law are the common property of all" and which therefore an individual could not appropriate. The principle of things common to all is relevant to the concept of the res publica, "the sum of the rights and interests of the Roman people, populus Romanus, understood as a whole," from which the word "republic" derives. However, a distinction is to be made between res communes omnium, which were to be accessible to all people but were not seen as owned by the Roman people, and res publicae, which was public property as the opposite of res privatae, private property. Ownership by the Roman people is expressed by publicum (for example, marketplaces, harbors, theatres).

Things common to all include air, flowing water, the sea, and the seashore.

- Air. Aër was distinguished from caelum, sky; although air can't be in private ownership, the immediate aerial space (caelum) over a property was to remain free from interference that impaired the owner's use of the property.
- Flowing water. Aqua profluens was communal (communis), but the designation as such was limited to the water itself. In terms of access (usus), rivers taken as a whole were considered public (flumina publica) if they flowed perpetually throughout the year. A river need not be navigable to be held as public, but the designation of a river as publicum was meant to ensure that everyone had access to navigating and docking along those that were. The riverbed and banks could be owned privately, but structures that impeded public use of a river were not permitted. However, whether water could be diverted from public rivers for private use was often the subject of water rights disputes.
- The sea. Everyone had the right to fish in the sea (mare); however, fishing rights could be surrendered contractually. In one case, a seller owned two adjacent properties along the shore. When he sold one, he imposed an encumbrance that the new owner could not engage in commercial tuna fishing, which was highly lucrative. The principle of freedom of contract resolved the apparent incompatibility with common use of the sea as res extra commercium because the new owner chose to waive a commonly held right in favor of the private contract.
- The shore. Everyone had the right to walk on the seashore (litus maris), the limit of which was defined by the reach of the highest winter wave. Potentially valuable things found naturally on the shore, such as pearls or gemstones, could become the property of a person through occupatio, the acquisition of a thing that belongs to no one (res nullius) simply by taking possession of it, as long as it was not a kind of thing excluded from private ownership. A building constructed on the shore belonged to the builder, but the shore under the building did not belong to the owner, and if the building was demolished or fell down, all rights lapsed.

In the application of law to property, the ultimate distinction was whether the property was governed by human or divine law. Res divini iuris are things set aside from human use because they are regulated by divine law, including a thing that is held as religiosa, sacra, or sancta.

Notably, in Ancient Rome human beings were considered legally as res for buying and selling as a matter of commercium; slavery in ancient Rome were widespread practices with protections in law for buyers and sellers.

== Justifications ==
Modern justifications of the doctrine of res extra commercium can be distinguished as liberal or non-liberal. In general, liberal legal systems assume that whenever the sides to a contract consent to its conditions freely and informed, with no coercion of any kind, then there's no justification to limit their agreements. The liberal approach holds that consent renders the contract desirable, and thus the state should not interfere. But even within the liberal approach, a departure from the freedom of contract principle can be warranted, as for lack of fairness or flawed consent.

For example, some liberals argue that prostitution should be prohibited because free trade cannot meaningfully issue from coercion or flawed consent. A liberal might also argue that prostitution exposes those who engage in it to risks of sexual offenses and violence— perhaps because enforcement of breaches of agreements would not be effective—and so should be banned, on the similar principle of banning construction work without proper protection for workers, or laws requiring the wearing of a seatbelt.

Res extra commercium can be also justified by non-liberal arguments such as moral enforcement or religious dogmas. Some scholars see non-liberal justifications from the perspective of violating civil liberties and human dignity. In this view, intervention in freedom of contract better upholds civil liberty.

Philosopher Michael Sandel argues that certain practices, such as organ trafficking or surrogacy, are intrinsically bad whether or not the people involved in them have freely consented. Sandel argues that surrogacy erodes the value of childbearing and distorts it, and thus it shouldn't be commodified. In Sandel's view, even the selling of labour can amount to unethical damage to civil liberty, if a person sells his labour in inhumane conditions; the issue is not lack of consent but infringement of human dignity.

In February 2018, the Indian government moved to curb the $11 billion tobacco industry's legal right to trade. For the first time, the government asked the Supreme Court to classify tobacco as res extra commercium as part of its efforts to tame the tobacco companies looking to challenge tough regulations in the industry.
