= Opera publica =

Opera publica is the Latin name used by Ancient Rome for the building of public works, construction, or engineering projects carried out under the direction of the state on behalf of the community. The term "public works" is a calque (literal word-by-word translation) of the Latin term. Public works in the Roman Empire were not merely buildings for the conduct of the business of running the city, but encompassed all buildings for public use. Therefore, amphitheatres, aqueducts, temples, basilicas, theatres, fora, arches, defensive walls, harbors, bridges, thermae, fountains, roads, circuses, markets, and cloacae were classified as opera publica.

Public works were an important department, and the Roman censors were entrusted with the expenditure of this department's public money, though the actual payments were no doubt made by the quaestors. The censors had general superintendence of all the public buildings and works. To meet the expenses connected with this part of their duties, the Senate voted them a certain sum of money or certain revenues, which they could employ according to their discretion. They ensured that the temples and all other public buildings were in a good state of repair, that no public places were encroached upon by private persons, and that the aqueduct, roads, drains, etc. were properly attended to. The repairs of the public works and the maintenance of their condition were let out by the censors by public auction to the lowest bidder, just as the vectigalia were let out to the highest bidder. These expenses were called ultrotributa, and hence we frequently find vectigalia and ultrotributa contrasted with one another. The persons who undertook the contract were called conductores, mancipes, redemptores, susceptores, etc.; and the duties they had to discharge were specified in the Leges Censoriae. The censors also superintended the expenses connected with the worship of the gods, including the feeding of the sacred geese in the Capitol, which was also let out on contract.

The censors were in charge of keeping existing public buildings and facilities in a proper state of repair, but also constructing new ones, either for ornament or utility, both in Rome and in other parts of Italy. These works were either performed by them jointly, or they divided the money granted to them by the Senate. They were contracted out, like the other works mentioned above, and when they were completed, the censors ensured that the work was performed in accordance with the contract; this was called opus probare or in acceptum referre. The aediles likewise had superintendence over the public buildings, and it is not easy to define with accuracy the respective duties of the censors and aediles. However, it may be remarked in general that the superintendence of the aediles had more of a police character, while that of the censors was more financial in nature.

Cicero (Legg. iii. 3, 7) divided the functions of the aediles under three categories: care of provisions (quality inspection), care of the games (and also festivals), and public works, which he called "care of the city". He notes responsibilities including the repair and preservation of temples, sewers, and aqueducts; street cleansing and paving; regulations regarding traffic, dangerous animals, and dilapidated buildings; precautions against fire; superintendence of baths and taverns; enforcement of sumptuary laws; punishment of gamblers and usurers; and the care of public morals generally, including the prevention of foreign superstitions. Aediles also punished those who had too large a share of the ager publicus or kept too many cattle on the state pastures.

== See also ==
- Corvée
- Curatores aedium sacrarum et operum locorumque publicorum
- Munera (ancient Rome)
