= Munera (ancient Rome) =

Public works and entertainment paid for by aristocrats of ancient Rome

In ancient Rome, munera (Latin plural; singular munus) were public works and entertainments provided for the benefit of the Roman people by individuals of high status and wealth. Munera means "duty, obligation" (cf. English "munificence"), expressing the individual's responsibility to provide a service or contribution to his community. The word was often a synonym for gladiatorial combat, which was originally sponsored as a funeral tribute at the tomb of a deceased Roman magnate by his heir. Munera depended on the private largesse of individuals, in contrast to ludi, which were games, athletic contests or spectacles sponsored by the state.

== Types and evolution ==
The most famous munera were the gladiatorial contests, which began as a service or gift rendered by the heirs of the deceased at funeral games. Munera could refer to the provision of such public services, or to the services themselves. In describing Rome's provision of water to the public, Frontinus describes certain lavishly decorated terminal fountains as munera. During the Republic and from 27 BC, many rich persons lavished funds on civic amenities, entertainments and banquets for citizens to gain their favor and enhance their own reputation. The crises of the Empire post-235 caused a rapid decrease in voluntary, private expenditures as evidenced by a dramatic drop in inscriptional attestations, for example of building works within cities credited to the governor and his representatives rather than the municipal aristocracies. From the time of the Tetrarchy (293–305), the munera of the curiales (city councilors) became subject to imperial regulation, apportionment and enforcement so that formerly voluntary "gifts" to the people became firstly civic obligations, then a form of taxation tied to a person's official status and social privilege, and finally a range of obligatory services rendered to the Roman State.

Munera patrimonialia (the compulsory rendering of property) or personalia (service rendered in person) included the quartering of soldiers and members of the imperial household, the provision of various raw materials for imperial use, services and supplies for the public post, the production of horses and recruits, services connected with the supplies for the army and transport of troops. Munera corporalia (bodily works) or munera sordida ("dirty" works) required physical labor such as making charcoal, lime-burning and breadmaking. In addition, the lower classes had to furnish labor (corvée) in the state factories, mines and quarries, and in the construction and repair of public buildings, highways, bridges and other public works (opera publica). During the Later Empire these compulsory services, an integral part of the tax system, fell increasingly on the middle and lower classes.

Other personalia included the production of garments, buying flour and oil for the city, monitoring the sale of bread and other food stuffs, collection and distribution of the Cura Annonae, collection in money of the capitatio, collection of civic revenues, police duties, the erection of palaces, docks, post stations, and the heating of the baths. Munera (known as liturgies in Greek) were but one of many monetary taxes. Increasingly, taxes in kind made up munera/liturgies and burdens (functiones) and other charges that made up the tax liability of individuals and their municipality, expressed as abstract units of assessment, or iuga (originally a unit pertaining to agricultural land and estimations of its likely yield). The term origo denotes and identifies the legal residence, region, village or estate of the registered taxpayer and/or liturgist. The unified fiscal system devised by Diocletian gave the Roman Empire a budget in the modern sense for the first time.

In the later empire, the performance of compulsory services was resented. The state made the obligation hereditary. The richest city councilors, principales, and others subject to the performance of munera or liturgies shifted the burden to their less wealthy colleagues, thereby weakening municipal government. Many tried to escape if they could, in particular, by rising to senatorial rank or by being granted exemptions.
