= Municipium =

Ancient Roman term for a town or city

In ancient Rome, the Latin term municipium (pl.: municipia) referred to a town or city. Etymologically, the municipium was a social contract among municipes ('duty holders'), or citizens of the town. The duties (munera) were a communal obligation assumed by the municipes in exchange for the privileges and protections of citizenship. Every citizen was a municeps.

The distinction of municipia was not made in the Roman Kingdom; instead, the immediate neighbours of the city were invited or compelled to transfer their populations to the urban structure of Rome, where they took up residence in neighbourhoods and became Romans per se. Under the Roman Republic the practical considerations of incorporating communities into the city-state of Rome forced the Romans to devise the concept of municipium, a distinct state under the jurisdiction of Rome. It was necessary to distinguish various types of municipia and other settlements, such as the colony. In the early Roman Empire these distinctions began to disappear; for example, when Pliny the Elder served in the Roman army, the distinctions were only nominal. In the final stage of development, all citizens of all cities and towns throughout the empire were equally citizens of Rome. The municipium then simply meant municipality, the lowest level of local government.

== Creation of a municipium ==
The munera and the citizenship and its rights and protections were specific to the community. No matter where a person lived, at home or abroad, or what his status or class, he was a citizen of the locality in which he was born. The distinguishing characteristic of the municipium was self-governance. Like any ancient city-state, the municipium was created by an official act of synoecism, or founding. This act removed the sovereignty and independence from the signatory local communities, replacing them with the jurisdiction of a common government. This government was then called the res publica ('public affair'), or in the Greek world the koinon ('common affair').

The term municipium began to be used with reference to the city-states of Italy brought into the city-state of Rome but not incorporated into the city. The city of Romulus synoecised the nearby settlements of Latium, transferring their populations to the seven hills, where they resided in typically distinct neighbourhoods. And yet, Sabines continued to live in the Sabine Hills and Alba Longa continued even though synoecised. The exact sequence of events is not known, whether the populace was given a choice or the synoecised sites were reoccupied. As it is unlikely that all the Sabines were invited to Rome, where facilities to feed and house them did not yet exist, it seems clear that population transfer was only offered to some. The rest continued on as independent localities under the ultimate governance of Rome. Under the Roman Republic the impracticality of transferring numerous large city-states to Rome was manifest. The answer to the problem was the municipium. The town would be partially synoecised. The local government would remain but to its munera would be added munera due to the city of Rome. The partial synoecism took the form of a charter granting incorporation into the city of Rome and defining the rights and responsibilities of the citizens. The first municipium was Tusculum.

== Two orders of the municipia ==
The citizens of municipia of the first order held full Roman citizenship and their rights (civitas optimo iure) included the right to vote, which was the ultimate right in Rome, and a sure sign of full rights.

The second order of municipia comprised important tribal centres which had come under Roman control. Residents of these did not become full Roman citizens (although their magistrates could become so after retirement). They were given the duties of full citizens in terms of liability to taxes and military service, but not all of the rights: most significantly, they had no right to vote.

Executive power in municipium was held by four annually elected officials, composed of two duumvirs and two aediles. Advisory powers were held by the decurions, appointed members of the local equivalent to the Senate. In later years, these became hereditary.

== Examples for grants of municipia ==
1. Volubilis in the province of Mauretania (modern day Morocco) was promoted to a municipium by the Emperor Claudius as a reward for its help in a revolt in AD 40–41.
2. The Emperor Vespasian granted 'Latin rights' to the provinces of Hispania (Tarraconensis, Baetica, Lusitania) in AD 73 or 74.
3. Marcus Servilius Draco Albucianus from Tripolitania successfully petitioned Rome to grant the status of municipium on his town.

== See also ==
- Local government (ancient Roman)
- Colonia (Roman)
- Roman citizenship
