= Curiales =

Social class in ancient Rome

In ancient Rome, the curiales (from curia + -ales, 'men of the same curia') were initially the leading members of gentes (clans) of the city of Rome. Their roles were both civil and sacred. Each gens curialis had a leader, called a curio. The whole arrangement of assemblies was presided over by the curio maximus.

== History ==
The Roman civic form was replicated in the towns and cities of the empire as they came under Roman control. By the Late Empire, curiales referred to the merchants, businessmen, and mid-level landowners who served in their local curia as local magistrates and decurions. Curiales were expected to procure funds for public building projects, temples, festivities, games, and local welfare systems. They would often pay for these expenses out of their own pocket, to gain prestige. From the mid-third century, this became an obligation, as Constantine I confiscated the cities' endowments, local taxes and dues, rent on city land and buildings. Julian returned these, but Valentinian I (363-375) and Valens (364-378) confiscated the resources. They did return one-third to the cities which was paid out by the Crown Estates which set aside city assets as separate line-items in the budget. Eventually management of these were returned to the cities. Not only were the curiales squeezed from the 4th century, but also the cities were hard put to maintaining their public infrastructure and public amenities even with help from the imperial government. The curiales were also responsible for the collection of Imperial taxes, provide food and board for the army (the assignments were under the control of the civilian administration), and support the imperial post (cursus publicus) whose expenses and maintenance were laid at the feet of the provincial landowners through whose territory the post moved.

In the course of the 4th and 5th centuries, membership in the curial class became financially ruinous to all but the most wealthy among them (who in many cases were able to purchase exemptions from their obligations), especially in the West, which was beset by settlements of tribes that disrupted the administration of the Empire and precipitated a decline in living standards by half from 400 to 600 A.D. Many curiales tried to escape by enrolling in the army, the Imperial government, or the Church, or by gaining senatorial rank, which exempted them from service on the councils. The imperial government tried to prevent this; curials and/or their sons found to have escaped before fulfilling their obligations were returned to the councils.

The Emperor Julian tried to combat this development by increasing the size of curial councils, spreading the burden more evenly to make the position less costly. This attempt was not successful, and Julian himself died before he had time to see the policy through. Other efforts to remedy the situation failed as well, and the councils dwindled in importance through the Late Roman period. In the course of the 5th century the governance of the cities fell into the hands more and more of an outside group of 'Notables' made up of persons who did not have to belong to the councils: senators, magnates, ex-military officers with estates, the richer former curiales, bishops, ex-imperial officials of higher standing and certain exempted professional classes.

== Decurions ==
A decurion was a member of a city senate in the Roman Empire. Decurions were drawn from the curiales class, which was made up of the wealthy middle class citizens of a town society. The emergence of the post of decurion may be found in Rome's decision to allow office-holders in Latin colonies in Italy to become Roman citizens in an attempt to create loyalty in 125 BC.

Decurions were the most powerful political figures at the local level. They were responsible for public contracts, religious rituals, entertainment, and ensuring order. Perhaps most importantly to the imperial government, they also supervised local tax collection.

Early in the imperial period, aristocratic citizens actively sought the post as a mark of prestige. They would gain seats in the front row of the theatre and be accepted into the class of honestiores (honourable men). Once elected, they were expected to pay large sums of their own money to perform public works; decurions would typically compete with each other to furnish the community with temples, baths, and other public facilities.

Under the Dominate (284 and later), when the empire's finances demanded more draconian tax collection measures, the position of decurion ceased being a status symbol and became an unwanted civil service position. It was still limited to the aristocracy, but the primary emphasis was clearly on tax collection, and decurions were expected to make up any shortfall in the local tax collection out of their own pockets. Many decurions illegally left their positions in an attempt to seek relief from this burden; if caught, they would be subject to forfeiture of their property or even execution.
