= Latin rights =

Ancient Roman set of legal rights

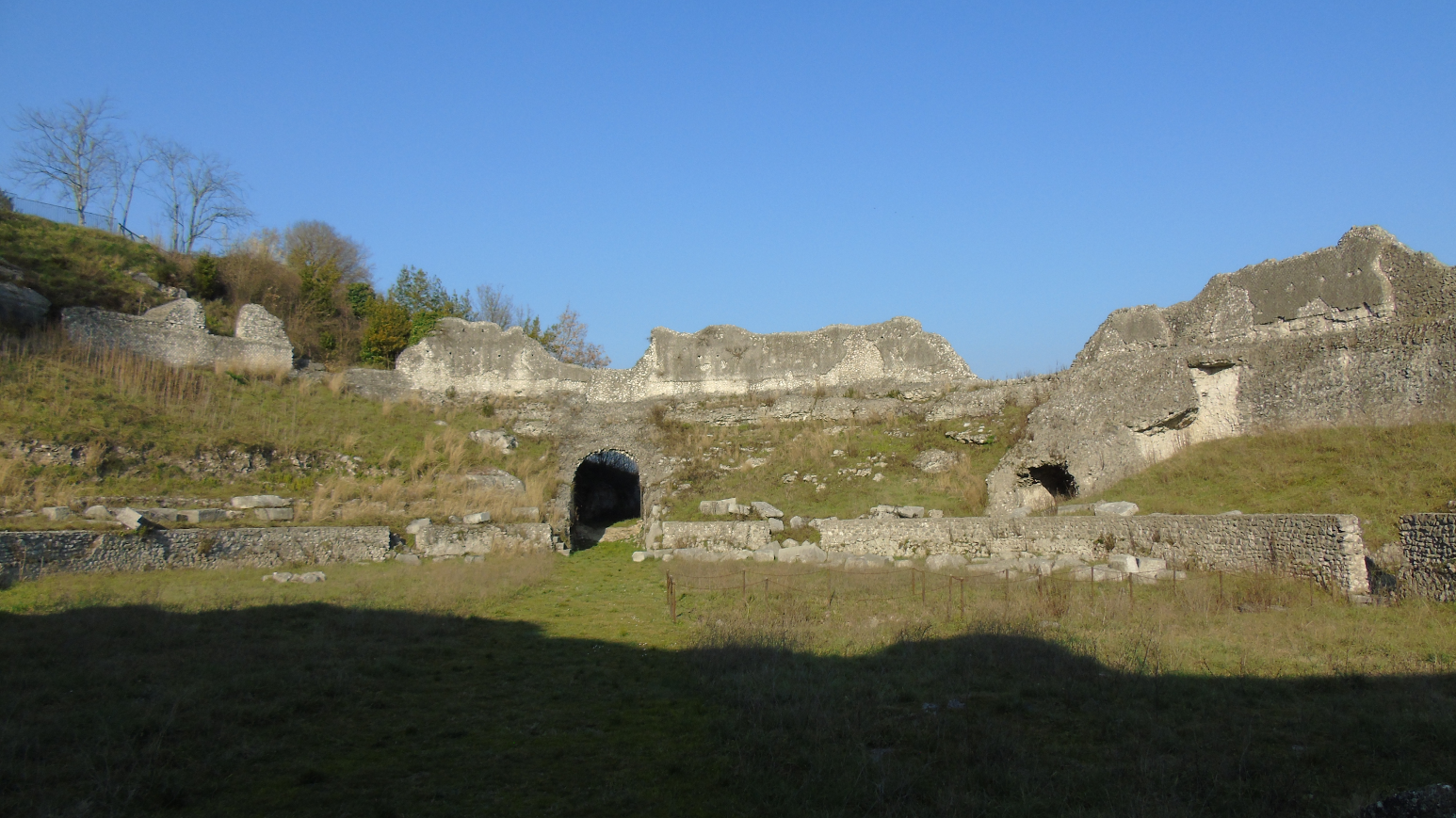
Casinum, in Latium adiectum, in today's Latin Valley. A Latin colony was founded in its territory.

Latin rights or Latin citizenship (Latin: ius Latii or ius latinum) were a set of legal rights that were originally granted to the Latins and therefore in their colonies (Latium adiectum). Latinitas was commonly used by Roman jurists to denote this status. With the Roman expansion in Italy, many settlements and coloniae outside of Latium had Latin rights.

All the Latini of Italy obtained Roman citizenship as a result of three laws which were introduced during the Social War between the Romans and their allies among the Italic peoples (socii) which rebelled against Rome. The Lex Iulia de Civitate Latinis (et sociis) Danda of 90 BC conferred Roman citizenship on all citizens of the Latin towns and the Italic towns who had not rebelled. The Lex Plautia Papiria de Civitate Sociis Danda of 89 BC granted Roman citizenship to all federated towns in Italy south of the River Po (in northern Italy). The Lex Pompeia de Transpadanis of 89 BC granted the ius Latii to the communities of Transpadania, a region north of the Po, which had sided with Rome during the Social War. It also granted Roman citizenship to those who became officials in their respective municipia (cities).

The exact content of the ius Latii, under Roman law, varied from city to city. It could include some or all of the following rights:

- Ius commercii: the right to trade, i. e., the right to have commercial relations and trade with Roman citizens on equal status and to use the same forms of contract as Roman citizens;
- Ius connubii: the right to marry pursuant to law;
- Ius migrationis: the right to migrate, i. e., the right to retain one's degree of citizenship upon relocation to another municipium. In other words, Latin status was not lost when moving to other locales in Italy.
- Ius civitatis mutandae: the right to become Roman citizens.

Some also had, under certain conditions, the Ius suffragii ("right to vote"); this was exercised as part of a single tribe and only if they migrated to Rome (differently from Roman citizens, who could exercise their right to vote, if they were in Rome, as part of their various tribes). Outside of Italy, the term Latinitas continued to be used for other cases. Cicero used this term in relation to Julius Caesar's grant of Latin rights to the Sicilians in 44 BC. This status was later given to whole towns and regions: Vespasian granted it to the whole of Hispania and the emperor Hadrian gave it to many towns. The ius Latii or Latinitas persisted to the reign of Justinian I in the sixth century AD.

== Origin ==
Rome was one of the many Latin cities of Italy. From 340 to 338 BC the Latin League, a confederation of circa 30 towns in Latium (land of the Latins) which was allied with Rome, rebelled in what has been called the Latin War. The Romans won the war and dissolved the Latin League. Many of the city-states of Latium were fully incorporated into the Roman Republic, while others were given limited rights and privileges which could be exercised in dealings with Roman citizens. These came to be known as ius Latii. The ius Latii was given to some Roman colonies which were founded around Italy in the fourth and third centuries BC to strengthen Roman control, as Rome expanded its hegemony over the peninsula. They were colonies which were given Latin legal status, and their settlers the ius Latii, instead of the Roman legal status of other colonies whose settlers kept Roman citizenship. Colonies of Latin status were called "Latin colonies" and those of Roman status were called "Roman colonies". Roman citizens who settled in a Latin colony lost their Roman citizenship and acquired ius Latii. Latin colonies were usually larger than Roman colonies and were populated largely by Latins and other allies.

With Roman expansion beyond Italy, Latin colonies were also founded outside Italy, e. g. Carteia (contemporary San Roque), which was founded in Hispania in 171 BC and was the first Latin colony outside of Italy. In 122 BC, the plebeian tribune Gaius Gracchus introduced a law which extended the ius Latii to all other residents of Italy. This reflected the increasing ties between Rome and the Italic peoples through trade and the ties between the leading families in the Italian towns and patrician families in Rome. In 44 BC, Julius Caesar granted the ius Latii to all free-born Sicilians.

== Under the Empire ==
Following the great spate of colonial settlements under Julius Caesar and Augustus, the ius Latii was used more as a political instrument that aimed at integration of provincial communities via their local leadership. Latin status included the acquisition of Roman citizenship upon the holding of municipal magistracy (ius adipiscendae civitatis per magistratum), which presumed a trajectory of development that would carry at least the local magistrates along the path to the institution of a Roman-style community. In AD 123, the emperor Hadrian made a key modification to Latin rights. He introduced Latium maius ("greater Latin [rights]"), which conferred Roman citizenship on all the decurions of a town, as distinguished from Latium minus, which conferred it only on those who held a magistracy.

The acquisition of ius Latii was wholly dependent on imperial gift. This beneficence could span the whole range from grants to individuals to awards made to whole towns, and could even be applied to an entire population, as when Emperor Vespasian gave the ius Latii to all of Hispania in AD 74. Although this decree could encompass whole cities, it did not necessarily entail the establishment of a municipium (self-governing town). Often, as in Hispania, formal municipia might have been constituted several years after the initial grant.

== Sources ==
- "ius Latii" from Smith's Dictionary of Greek and Roman Antiquities, 1875.
- "jus Latii" from Encyclopædia Britannica, 2007
- "Latin Revolt"
- Livy XLIII. 3–4. cf. Galsterer 1971, 8-9: (G 15); Humbert 1976, 225-34: (H 138).
- Bowman, A. K., Champlin, E., Lintott, A., (Eds), The Cambridge Ancient History, Volume 10: The Augustan Empire, 43 BC-AD 69, Cambridge University Press, 2nd edition, 1996; ISBN 978-0521264303
- Bowman, A. K., Garnsey, P., Rathbone, D., (Eds), The Cambridge Ancient History Volume XI: The High Empire A.D. 70–192, Cambridge University Press, 2nd edition, 2000, 364–365; ISBN 978-0521263351
- S. A. et al. (Eds.), The Cambridge Ancient History Volume VII: The Hellenistic Monarchies and the Rise of Rome, Cambridge University Press; 5th edition 1928, pp 269–271; ISBN 978-0521044899
- Lewis, N., Reinhold, M Roman Civilization: Selected Readings, Vol. 1: The Republic and the Augustan Age, 3rd edition, Columbia University Press, 1990; ISBN 978-0231071314
- Lewis, N., Reinhold, M Roman Civilization: Selected Readings, Vol. 2: The Empire, 3rd edition, Columbia University Press, 1990; ISBN 978-0231071338
