= Capua =

- Comune
- Comune di Capua
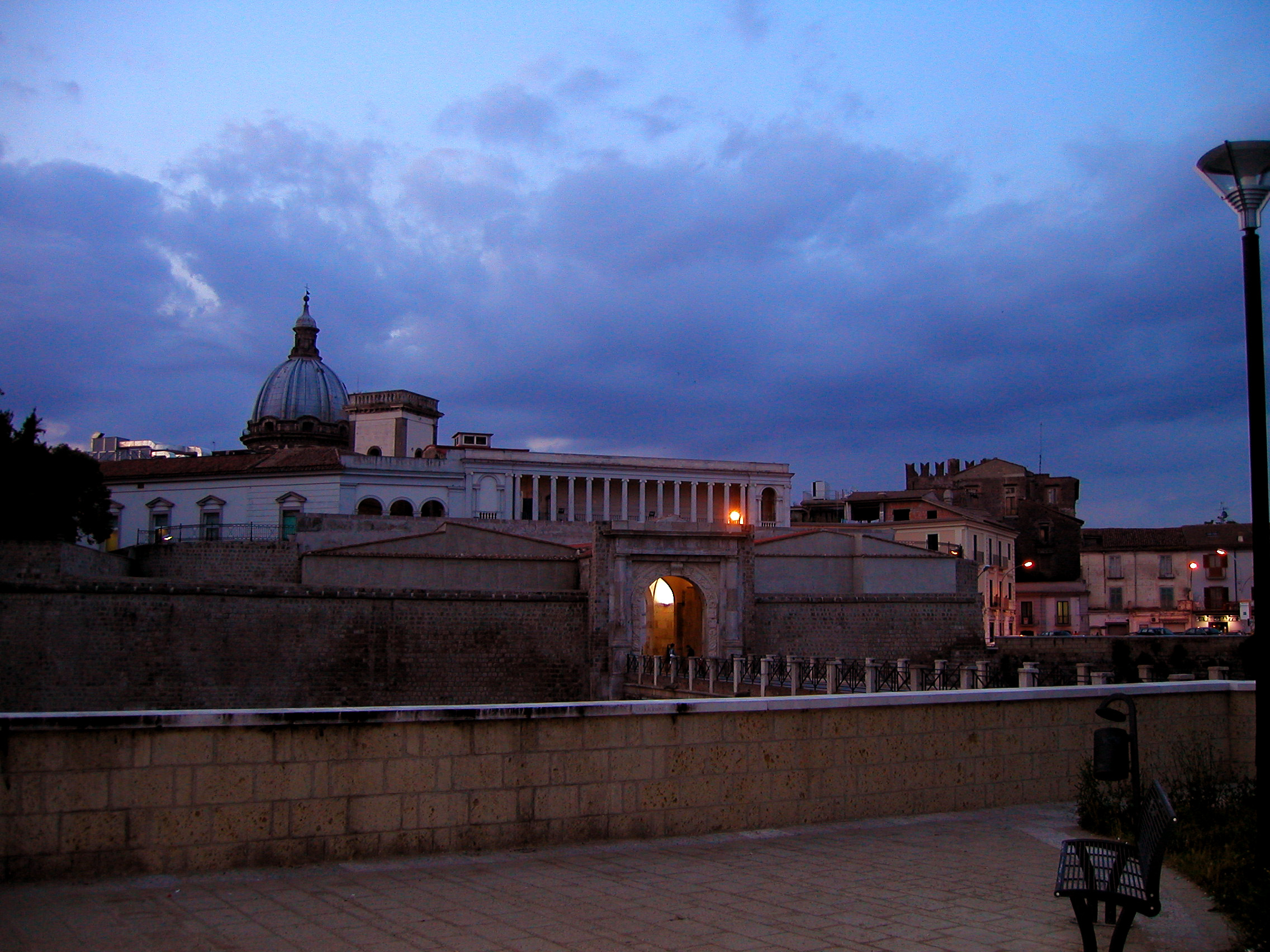

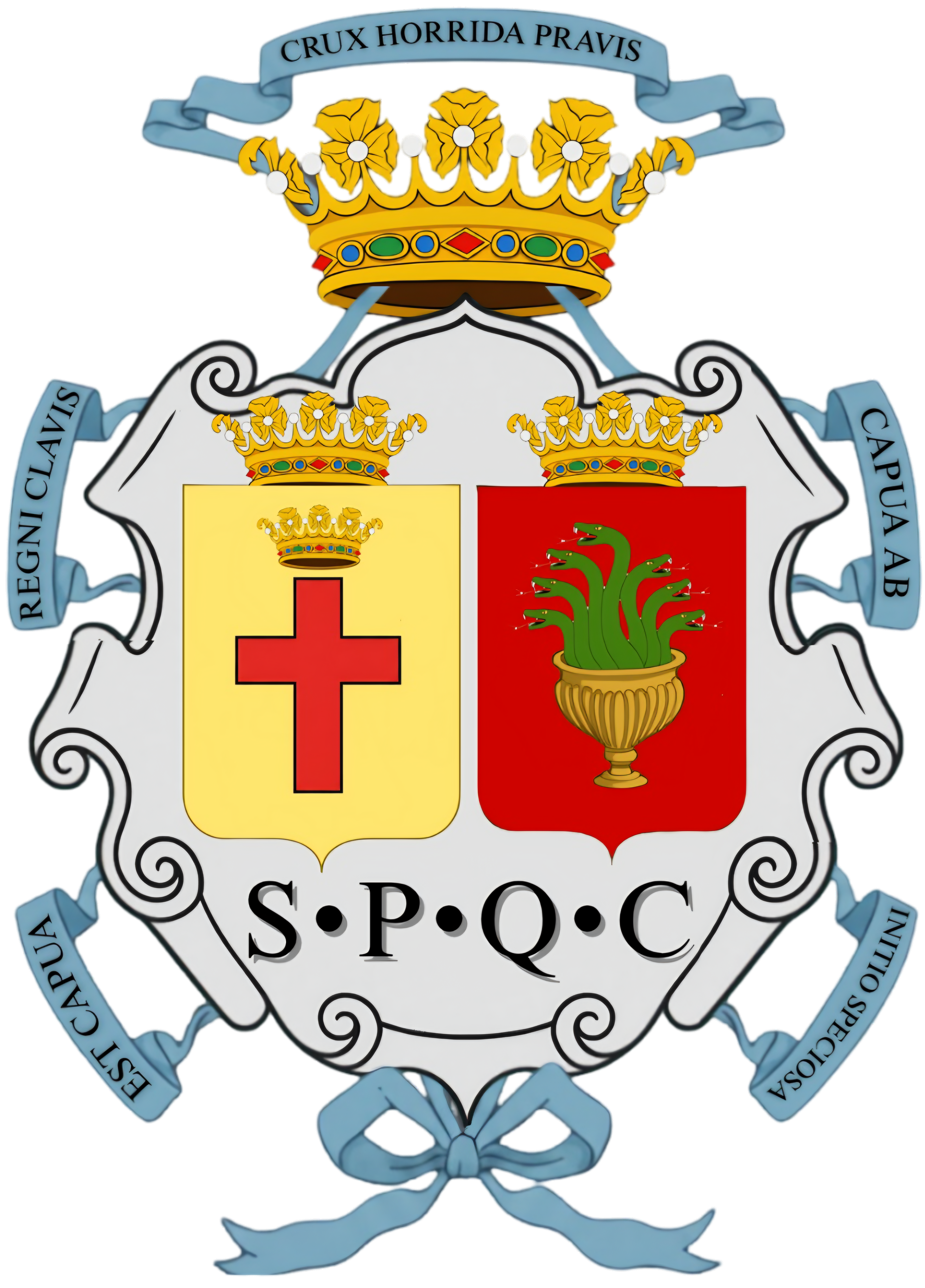
- Coat of arms

- Location within Italy Location within Campania
- Coordinates: 41°06′20″N 14°12′50″E
- Country: Italy
- Region: Campania
- Province: Caserta (CE)
- Frazioni: Sant'Angelo in Formis

Government
  - Mayor: Adolfo Villani (PD)

Area
  - Total: 48.63 km^{2} (18.78 sq mi)
- Elevation: 25 m (82 ft)

Population (31 December 2017)
  - Total: 18,484
  - Density: 380.1/km^{2} (984.4/sq mi)
- Demonym: Capuani
- Time zone: UTC+1 (CET)
  - Summer (DST): UTC+2 (CEST)
- Postal code: 81043
- Dialing code: 0823
- Patron saint: St. Agatha
- Saint day: 5 February
- Website: Official website

UNESCO World Heritage Site
- Part of: Via Appia. Regina Viarum
- Criteria: Cultural: iii, iv, vi
- Reference: 1708-009
- Inscription: 2024 (46th Session)

Capua (/ˈkæpjuə/ KAP-yoo-ə; Italian: [ˈkaːpwa]) is a city and comune in the province of Caserta, in the region of Campania, southern Italy, located on the northeastern edge of the Campanian plain on the Volturno river. The town was founded after the destruction of Ancient Capua, now Santa Maria Capua Vetere.

== History ==
=== Ancient era ===
Capua's name comes from the Etruscan Capeva, which means 'City of Marshes'. Its foundation is attributed by Cato the Elder to the Etruscans, and the date is given as about 260 years before it was conquered by Rome. That, if true, refers not to its capture in the Second Punic War (211 BC), but to its submission to Rome in 338 BC. That places the date of foundation at about 600 BC, while Etruscan power was at its highest. In the area, several settlements of the Villanovian civilization were present in prehistoric times. These were probably enlarged by the Oscans, and subsequently by the Etruscans.

Etruscan supremacy in Campania came to an end with the Samnites' invasion in the latter half of the 5th century BC.

In about 424 BC, Capua was captured by the Samnites, and in 343 BC, it sought Roman help against its conquerors. They allied for protection against the Samnite mountain tribes, along with its dependent communities of Casilinum, Calatia, Atella and so the greater part of Campania now fell under Roman supremacy. The citizens of Capua received the civitas sine suffragio (citizenship without the vote).

In the second Samnite War with Rome, Capua proved an untrustworthy Roman ally, so that after the defeat of the Samnites, the Ager Falernus on the right bank of the Volturnus was confiscated. In 318 BC the powers of the native officials (meddices) were limited by the appointment of officials with the title praefecti Capuam Cumas (taking their name from the most important towns of Campania); they were at first mere deputies of the praetor urbanus but after 123 BC were elected Roman magistrates, four in number; they governed the whole of Campania until the time of Augustus, when they were abolished. It was the capital of Campania Felix.

In 312 BC, Capua was connected with Rome by the construction of the Via Appia, the most important of the military highways of Italy. The gate by which it left the Servian walls of Rome bore the name Porta Capena; perhaps the only case in which a gate in this line of fortifications bears the name of the place to which it led. At some time the Via Latina was extended to Casilinum. It afforded a route only 10 km (6.2 mi) longer, and the difficulties with its construction were much less; it also avoided the troublesome journey through the Pontine Marshes.

The importance of Capua increased steadily during the 3rd century BC, and at the beginning of the Second Punic War, it was considered to be only slightly behind Rome and Carthage themselves and furnished 30,000 infantry and 4,000 cavalry. Until after the defeat of Cannae, it remained faithful to Rome, but, after an unsuccessful demand that one of the consuls should always be selected from it (or perhaps to secure regional supremacy in the event of a Carthaginian victory), it defected to Hannibal. He made it his winter quarters, and he and his army were voluntarily received by Capua. Livy and others have suggested that the luxurious conditions were Hannibal's "Cannae" because his troops became soft and demoralized by luxurious living. Historians from Reginald Bosworth Smith onwards have been skeptical of that and observed that his troops gave as good an account of themselves in battle after that winter as before. After a long siege, Capua was taken by the Romans in 211 BC and severely punished; its magistrates and communal organization were abolished, the inhabitants who had not been killed lost their civic rights, and its territory was declared ager publicus (Roman state domain). Parts of it were sold in 205 BC and 199 BC, another part was divided among the citizens of the new colonies of Volturnum and Liternum, established near the coast in 194 BC, but the greater portion of it was reserved to be let by the state.

Considerable difficulties occurred in preventing illegal encroachments by private persons, and it became necessary to buy a number of them out in 162 BC. It was, after that period, let not to large but to small proprietors. Frequent attempts were made by the democratic leaders to divide the land among new settlers. M. Junius Brutus the Elder in 83 BC actually succeeded in establishing a colony, but it was soon dissolved; and Cicero's speeches De Lege Agrania were directed against a similar attempt by Servilius Rullus in 63 BC.

In the meantime, the necessary organization of the inhabitants of this thickly populated district was in a measure supplied by grouping them round important shrines. Many inscriptions testify to a pagus Dianae associated with the shrine to Diana Tifatina; a pagus Herculaneus is also known.

The town of Capua belonged to none of those organizations, and was entirely dependent on the praefecti. It enjoyed great prosperity, however, from its growing of spelt, a grain that was put into groats, wine, roses, spices, unguents etc and also from its manufacture, especially of bronze objects, of which both the elder Cato and the elder Pliny speak in the highest terms.

Its luxury remained proverbial, and Campania was especially noted as the home of gladiatorial combat. It was from the gladiatorial schools of the region that Spartacus and his followers emerged during their revolt in 73 BC. In 59 BC, Julius Caesar, serving as consul, established a Roman colony in the territory—named Colonia Julia Felix—under his agrarian reform, settling 20,000 Roman citizens in Capua.

The number of colonists was increased by Mark Antony, Augustus (who constructed an aqueduct from the Mons Tifata and gave the town of Capua estates in the district of Knossos in Crete valued at 12 million sesterces) and Nero.

In the War of 69 AD, Capua took the side of Vitellius. Under the later empire, it is not often mentioned, but in the 4th century, it was the seat of the consularis Campaniae and its chief town, though Ausonius put it behind Mediolanum (Milan) and Aquileia in his ordo nobilium urbium.

=== Middle Ages ===
Under Constantine, a Christian church was founded in Capua. In 456, it was taken and destroyed by the Vandals under Gaiseric but was likely soon rebuilt.

During the Gothic War, Capua suffered greatly. When the Lombards invaded Italy in the second half of the 6th century, Capua was ravaged, Later, it was included in the Duchy of Benevento, and ruled by an official styled gastald.

In 839, the prince of Benevento, Sicard, was assassinated by Radelchis I of Benevento, who took over the throne. Sicard's brother Siconulf was proclaimed independent prince in Salerno and the gastald of Capua declared himself independent.

In 840, ancient Capua was burned to the ground by a band of Saracen mercenaries called by Radelchis I of Benevento with only the church of Santa Maria Maggiore (founded about 497) remaining, which was purposely spared by the invading Muslims, whose policy was that to leave houses of worship alone. A new city was built in 856, but at some distance from the former site, where another town later appeared under the name of Santa Maria Capua Vetere ("Capua the Old").

Prince Atenulf I conquered Benevento in 900 and united the principalities until 981, when Pandulf Ironhead separated them in his will for his children. Capua eclipsed Benevento thereafter and became the chief rival of Salerno. Under Pandulf IV, the principality brought in the aid of the Normans and, for a while had the loyalty of Rainulf Drengot, until the latter abandoned him to aid the deposed Sergius IV of Naples take back his city, annexed by Pandulf in 1027.

Upon Pandulf's death, Capua fell to his weaker sons and, in 1058, the city itself fell in a siege to Rainulf's nephew Richard I, who took the title Prince of Aversa. For seven years (1091–1098), Richard II was exiled from his city, but with the aid of his relatives, he retook the city after a siege in 1098. His dynasty lived on as princes of Capua until the last claimant of their line died in 1156 and the principality was definitively united to the kingdom of Sicily. In the 1230s, King Frederick I built the monumental City Gate of Capua.

In the early 1500s, it was reported to Pope Alexander VI that his son, Cesare Borgia, had captured the city and promptly killed all 6,000 citizens, which included women and children, while commanding French troops during the sieges of Naples and Capua.

=== Modern Age ===
Map of Capua (around 1760)

On 3 January 1799, during the French Revolutionary Wars, the community was successfully attacked by a French-controlled 1798–1799 Roman Republic Army, led by Governor Étienne MacDonald.

The Battle of Volturnus (1860), at the conclusion of Garibaldi's Expedition of the Thousand, partially took place in and around Capua. Prior to the battle, the Neapolitan Army, defeated in earlier engagements, was rebuilt in Capua under marshal Giosuè Ritucci. After fighting elsewhere in which the Neapolitans were ultimately defeated, the last of them, around 3,000 troops under Colonel Ettore Perrone di San Martino, were holed up in Capua. The city was attacked by the Garibaldines and one Piedmontese regular Bersaglieri battalion, and captured. In the referendum several months later, its inhabitants voted overwhelmingly to join the new Kingdom of Italy.

== Main sights ==
- Cathedral of Santo Stefano — Originally built in 856, the cathedral features a lofty campanile and a renovated interior with three aisles. Both the church and its atrium incorporate ancient granite columns. The restored Romanesque crypt also contains ancient columns. Notable artworks include a fine paschal candlestick and fragments of a 13th-century pulpit with marble mosaic. The cathedral also preserves an elaborate Exultet roll and a late 12th-century evangelarium, bound in bronze and decorated with gold filigree and enamels. Mosaics from the early 12th century once adorned the apses of the cathedral and the nearby church of San Benedetto, but were destroyed around 1720 and 1620, respectively.
- Church of San Marcello — Also erected in 856, this small church is one of the city's oldest.
- Castle of Frederick II — Between 1232 and 1240, Emperor Frederick II built a castle to protect the Roman bridge over the Volturnus. The structure included a triumphal arch flanked by two towers and was decorated with statues imitating classical sculpture. The castle was demolished in 1557, but some statues are preserved in the Museo Campano.
- Museo Campano — Established in 1870 and opened to the public in 1874, the Museo Campano (Campania Provincial Museum of Capua) has since become a significant cultural institution for the region.

== Archaeological sites ==
=== Remains ===
No pre-Roman remains have been found within the town of Capua itself, but important cemeteries have been discovered on all sides of it, the earliest of which go back to the 7th or 6th century BC.

The tombs are of various forms, partly chambers with frescoes on the walls, partly cubical blocks of peperino, hollowed out, with grooved lids. The objects found within them consist mainly of vases of bronze (many of them without feet, and with incised designs of Etruscan style) and of clay, some of Greek, some of local manufacture, and of paintings. On the east of the town, in the Patturelli property, a temple has been discovered with Oscan votive inscriptions originally thought to be Oscan, now recognized as Etruscan, some of them inscribed upon terracotta tablets, the most famous of which is the Tabula Capuana, conserved in Berlin, still, after more than a century of searching, the second-longest Etruscan text. Other brief inscriptions are on cippi. A group of 150 tuff statuettes represent a matron holding one or more children in her lap: three bore Latin inscriptions of the early Imperial period.

The site of the town being in a perfectly flat plain, without natural defences, it was possible to lay it out regularly. Its length from east to west is accurately determined by the fact that the Via Appia, which runs from north-west to south-east from Casilinum to Calatia, turns due east very soon after passing the so-called Arch of Hadrian (a triumphal arch of brickwork, once faced with marble, with three openings, erected in honour of some emperor unknown), and continues to run in this direction for 1,600 metres (5,200 ft) (6,000 ancient Oscan feet).

The west gate was the Porta Romana; remains of the east gate have also been found, although its name is unknown. This fact shows that the main street of the town was perfectly oriented, and that before the Via Appia was constructed, i.e. in all probability in pre-Roman times. The width of the town from north to south cannot be so accurately determined as the line of the north and south walls is not known, though it can be approximately fixed by the absence of tombs. Beloch fixes it at 4,000 Oscan feet = 1,100 metres (3,600 ft), nor is it absolutely certain (though it is in the highest degree probable, for Cicero praises its regular arrangement and fine streets) that the plan of the town was rectangular.

Within the town are remains of public baths on the north of the Via Appia and of a theatre opposite, on the south. The former consisted of a large cryptoporticus round three sides of a court, the south side being open to the road; it now lies under the prisons. Beloch (see below) attributes this to the Oscan period; but the construction as shown in Labruzzi's drawing (v. 17) 1 is partly of brick-work and opus reticulatum, which may, of course, belong to a restoration. The stage of the theatre had its back to the road; Labruzzi (v. 18) gives an interesting view of the cavea. It appears from inscriptions that it was erected after the time of Augustus.

Other inscriptions, however, prove the existence of a theatre as early as 94 BC. The Roman colony was divided into regions and possessed a capitolium, with a temple of Jupiter, within the town, and the marketplace, for unguents especially, was called Seplasia; an aedes alba is also mentioned, which is probably the original senate house, which stood in an open space known as albana. But the sites of all these are uncertain. A Mithraeum may also be seen, by appointment.

To the east of the amphitheatre an ancient road, the Via Dianae, leads north to the Pagus Dianae, on the west slopes of the Mons Tifata, a community which sprang up around the famous and ancient temple of Diana, and probably received an independent organization after the abolition of that of Capua in 211 BC. The place often served as a base for attacks on the latter, and Sulla, after his defeat of Gaius Norbanus, gave the whole of the mountain to the temple.

Within the territory of the pagus were several other temples with their magistri. After the restoration of the community of Capua, magistri of the temple of Diana are still attested, but they were probably officials of Capua itself.

The site is occupied by the Benedictine church of San Michele Arcangelo in Sant'Angelo in Formis. It dates from 944, and was reconstructed by the abbot Desiderius (afterwards Pope Victor III) of Monte Cassino. It has interesting paintings, dating from the end of the 11th century to the middle of the 12th, in which five different styles may be distinguished. They form a complete representation of all the chief episodes of the New Testament. Deposits of votive objects (favissae), removed from the ancient temple from time to time as new ones came in and occupied all the available space, have been found, and considerable remains of buildings belonging to the Vicus Dianae (among them a triumphal arch and some baths, also a hail with frescoes, representing the goddess herself ready for the chase) still exist.

The ancient road from Capua went on beyond the Vicus Dianae to the Volturnus (remains of the bridge still exist) and then turned east along the river valley to Caiatia and Telesia. Other roads ran to Puteoli and Cumae (the so-called Via Campana) and to Neapolis, and the Via Appia passed through Capua, which was thus the most important road centre of Campania.

== See also ==
- Archdiocese of Capua
- Battle of Capua
- Capua Leg
- Coinage of Capua
- History of Santa Maria Capua Vetere
- University of Campania Luigi Vanvitelli
