= Santa Maria Capua Vetere =

- Comune
- Città di Santa Maria Capua Vetere
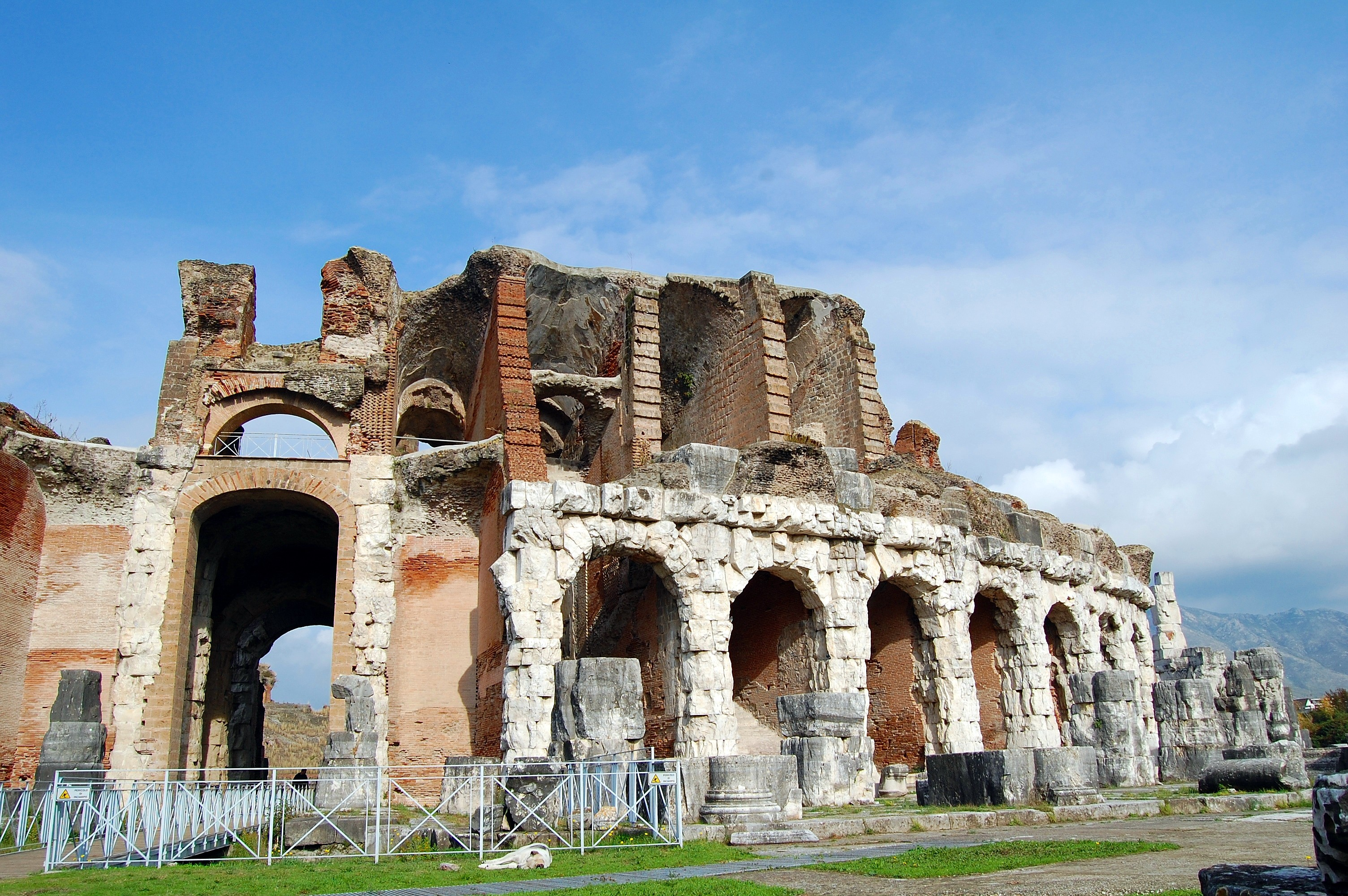
- The Amphitheatre

- Coat of arms

- Location within Italy Location within Campania
- Coordinates: 41°05′N 14°15′E
- Country: Italy
- Region: Campania
- Frazioni: Sant'Andrea dei Lagni

Government
  - Mayor: Antonio Mirra

Area
  - Total: 36 km^{2} (14 sq mi)
- Elevation: 36 m (118 ft)

Population (31 August 2015)
  - Total: 32,793
  - Density: 910/km^{2} (2,400/sq mi)
- Demonym: Sammaritani or Mariani
- Time zone: UTC+1 (CET)
  - Summer (DST): UTC+2 (CEST)
- Postal code: 81055
- Dialing code: 0823
- Patron saint: St. Simmachus and Bl. Vergin Maria Assunta
- Saint day: October 22 and August 15
- Website: Official website

Santa Maria Capua Vetere is a town and comune in the province of Caserta, in the region of Campania, southern Italy.

It is nicknamed by the locals "The city of Spartacus"

After the destruction of Ancient Capua, the town developed during the medieval period near the site of the Roman amphitheatre and the old Christian basilica of Santa Maria Maggiore, which is the old name of the town. Its name was later changed to Santa Maria Capua Vetere—with Capua Vetere meaning "Old Capua"—to reflect its historical association with the ancient city.

== History ==
=== Ancient times ===
The city lies on what once was the great ancient city of Capua. Its founding date is uncertain, although the historian Velleius Paterculus claims it was founded around 800 B.C. The name probably comes from Etruscan Capeva, meaning "City of marshes".

In the area several settlements of the Villanovan culture were present in pre-historical times, and these were probably enlarged by the Oscans and Etruscans. In the 5th century BC the city underwent a serious restructuring of its urban layout under Etruscan rule, during this time, many oscan speaking peoples migrated to the city from further inland as cheap labour. They were granted citizenship by the Etruscan rulers in 438 BC and went on to dominate the city after Etruscan collapse in southern Italy. In the 4th century BC Capuae was the largest city in Italy after Rome. During a war against the invading Samnites, in 343 BC the city willingy submitted to Rome for protection and in 338 BC it became a 'civitas sine suffragio', however it retained its own laws, customs, language and senate. The city was connected to Rome in 312 B.C. after the construction of the Via Appia, the most important roman road in Italy. It was the capital of Campania Felix.

==== Second Punic War ====
In 3rd century BC the city continued to grow, and at the start of the second punic war it furnished 30.000 infantry and 4.000 cavalry. Until the Roman defeat at Cannae, it remained loyal to Rome.

The city then allied with Hannibal against Rome after their demand that one of the two consuls be from Capua was rejected. It became Hannibal's winter quarters and during this period it had its own coinage. The population and political élite were split between the pro-Roman faction, headed by Decius Magius and the more popular anti-Roman faction headed by senator Vibius Virrius, who wanted to secure supremacy in Italy with the help of Carthage. The city was eventually retaken by the romans after a brutal siege in 211 BC, the leaders of the revolt, including Virrius, committed suicide and most of the population was either sold into slavery or killed, the survivors lost their civic rights and its territory was declared ager publicus. It was also stripped of its senate, but slowly regained importance as one of the richest cities in the empire.

It was home to one of the first and most prestigious gladiatorial schools in the world, Spartacus trained here and eventually started his revolt in 73 B.C.

In 59 BC, Julius Caesar established the Colonia Iulia Felix, resettling 20.000 Roman citizens in Capua.

=== Medieval period and decline ===
The city was damaged by Vandal ravages but later recovered and became the seat of an independent Lombard principate. However, during the struggle of the succession to the Duchy of Benevento, it was destroyed by a band of Saracens in 841 AD with only the church of Santa Maria Maggiore remaining intact. The survivors mostly fled and founded modern Capua in the site of the ancient River port of Casilinum, while some stayed behind and erected fortifications in the amphitheatre, also called Berolais.

=== Slow rebirth ===
What is now Santa Maria Capua Vetere started to grow slowly when several countryside residences appeared around the old Christian basilicas of Santa Maria Maggiore, San Pietro in Corpo and Sant'Erasmo in Capitolio. King Robert of Anjou was born here and made Santa Maria Maggiore one of his summer residences. It was a mainly agricultural town and slowly grew in size through the centuries.

In 1501 it served as the headquarters of the French army sieging new Capua.

In 1672 it gave birth to the sculptor Nicola Salzillo, whose son, Francisco Salzillo, became one of the most important spanish sculptors.

The town was known as Santa Maria Maggiore until 1861.

=== Modern Era ===
During the XVIII and IXX centuries the city had an urban expansion, mainly northward with the construction of many iconic buildings, such as the Garibaldi theatre, the classical lyceum and the villa comunale, with its monument to the battle of Volturno which took place in the city. The corso was also lenghtened. The city gave birth to one of the most important italian anarchists of the XX century: Errico Malatesta.

During World War I, Santa Maria Capua Vetere was the location of a military camp for Polish prisoners of war from the Austro-Hungarian Army, who then formed new Polish units to fight for Polish independence (see also Italy–Poland relations).

Today it hosts the provincial tribunal, established in 1808, making it an important judicial center.

== Main sights ==
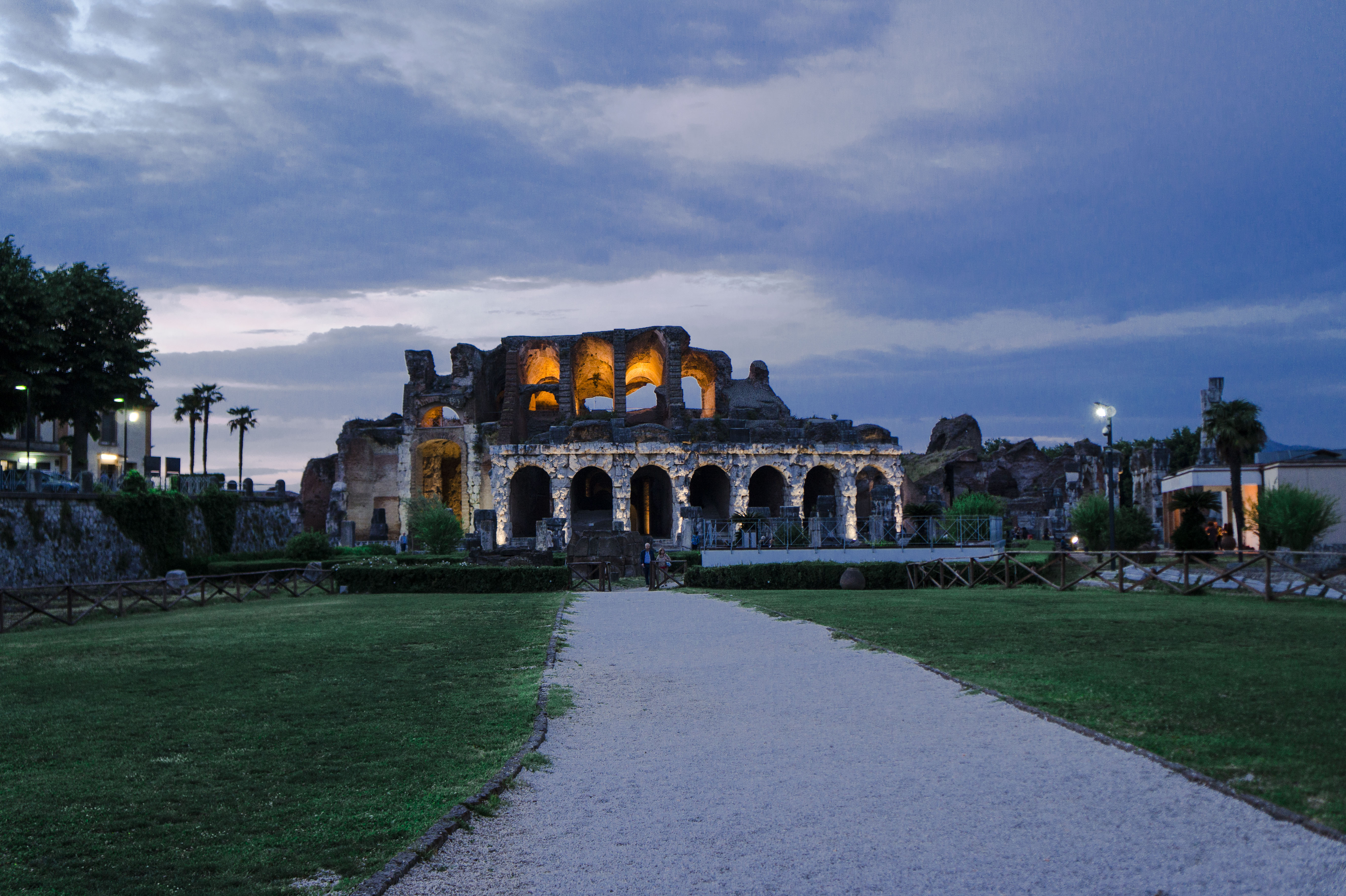
The Amphitheatre

The main sight present in Santa Maria Capua Vetere is the roman amphitheatre of ancient Capua. It is the second biggest amphitheatre after the colosseum and in front of it lie the ruins of a smaller amphitheatre, which is where Spartacus fought.

Built during Augustus' rule, it was restored by Hadrian. The exterior was composed of 80 Doric arcades four stories high, with only two remaining. The keystones had sculpted heads of divinities. The underground tunnels are well preserved and explorable. The dimensions are as follows: the longer diameter is 170 metres (560 ft), the shorter 140 metres (460 ft), and the arena measures 75 by 45 metres (246 by 148 ft), the corresponding dimensions in the Colosseum at Rome being 188, 155, 85, 53 metres (615, 510, 279 and 174 ft).

Close to it lies also the Arch of Hadrian which was located at the northwestern entrance to the city. The mithraeum is also an important landmark being one of the few very well preserved ones in the former empire.

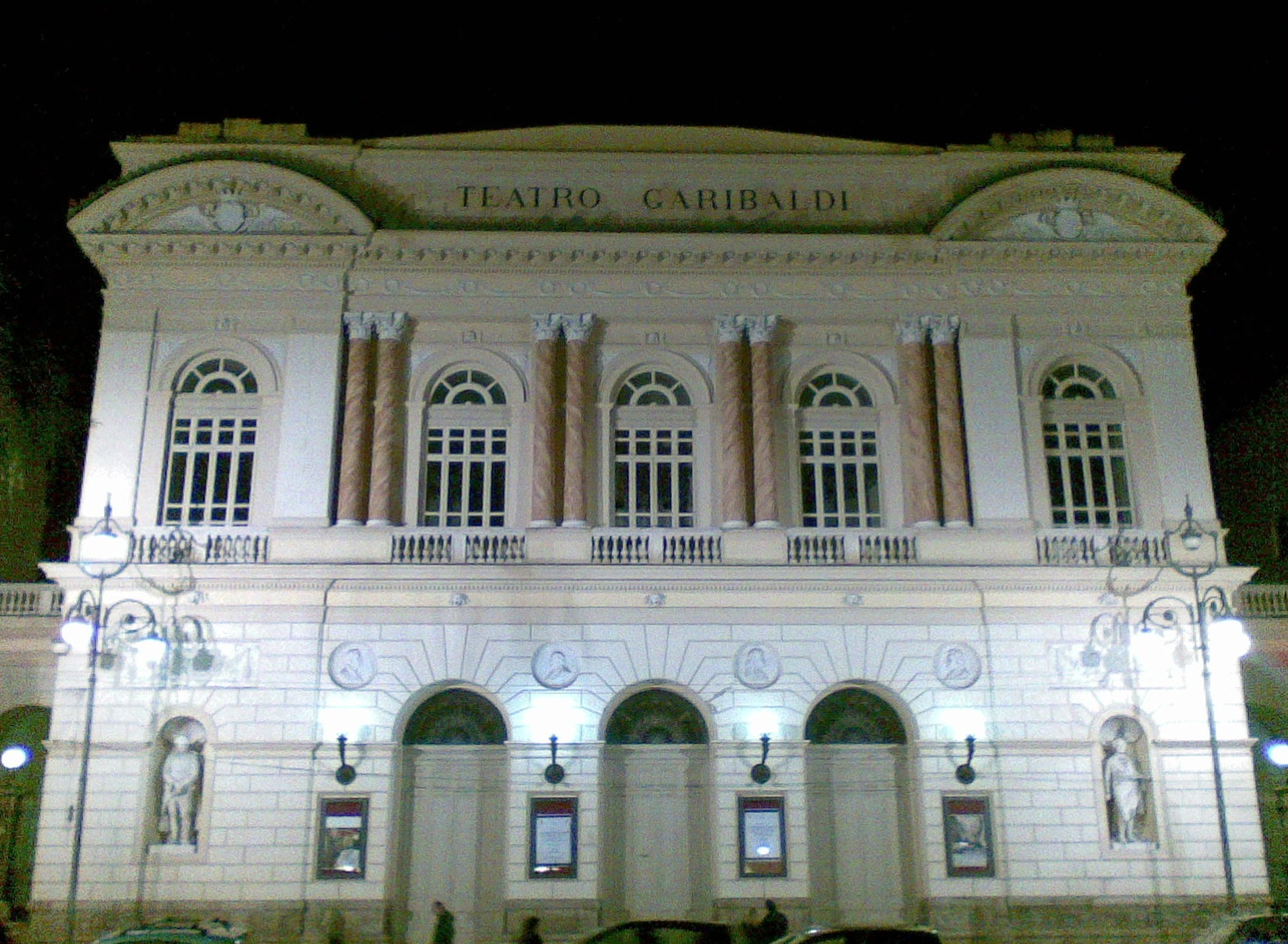
The Garibaldi theatre

The other principal landmark within Santa Maria Capua Vetere is the basilica of Santa Maria Maggiore, which, according to tradition, was founded by Pope Symmachus (the city's Patron saint) in the 5th century. The original structure featured a single nave, but was expanded in 787 by the Lombard prince Arechis II of Benevento. A further renovation took place in 1666 under Cardinal Robert Bellarmine, adding two additional aisles. The church's current Late Baroque appearance results from restoration works carried out between 1742 and 1788, during which the original mosaic decoration in the apse was unfortunately destroyed.

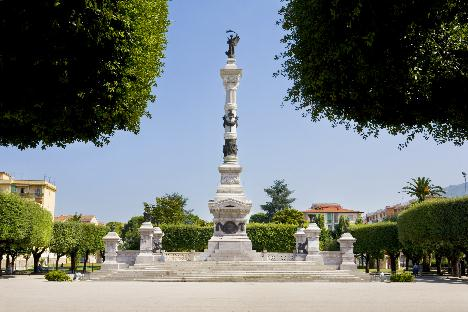
Monument to the battle of Volturno in the city park

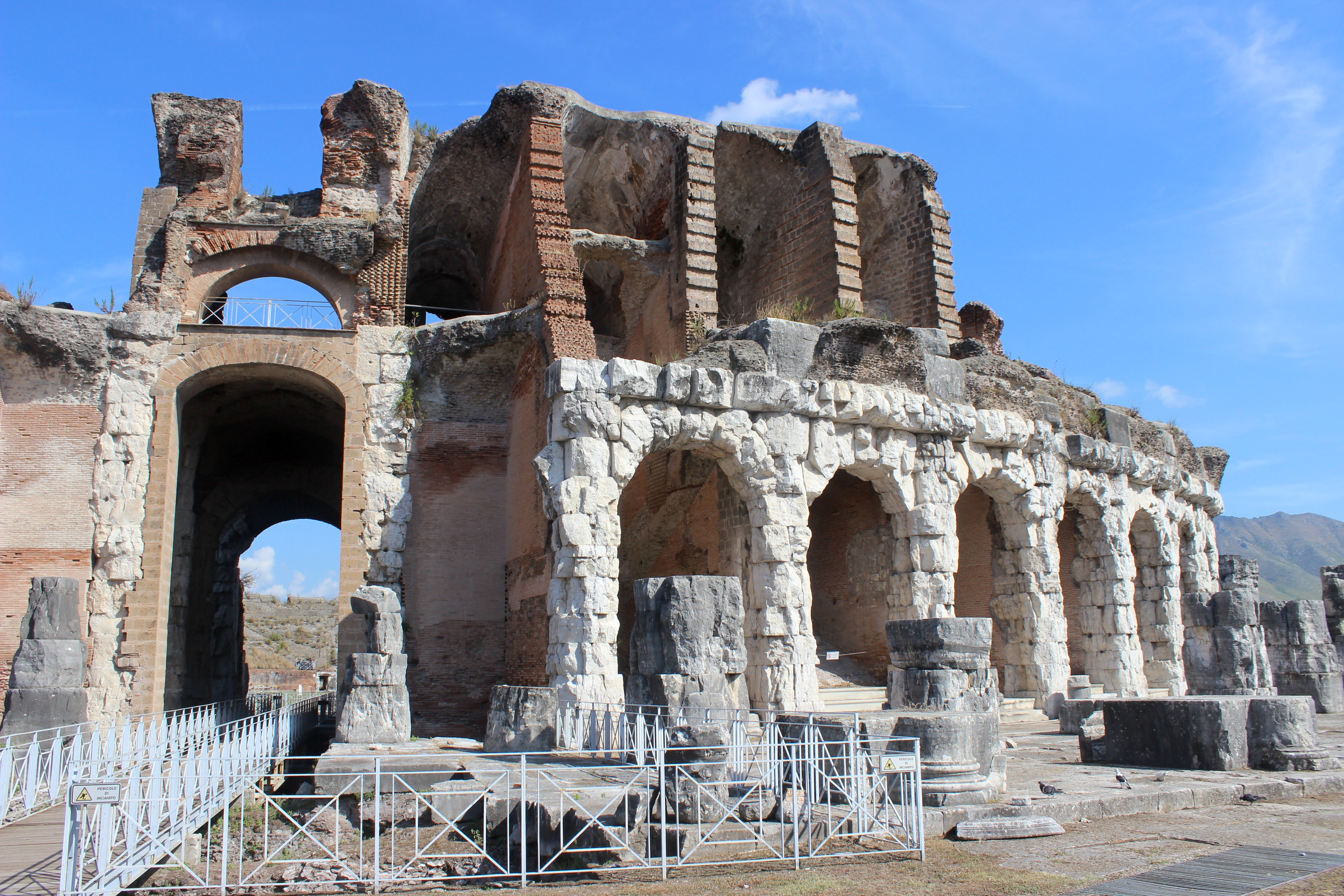
The Amphitheatre of ancient Capua

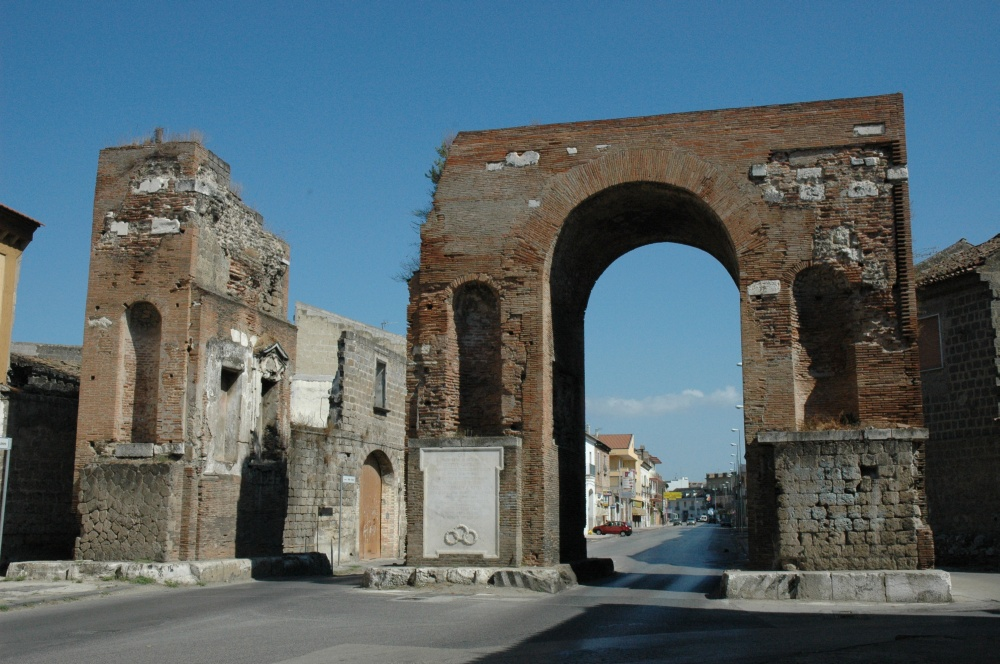
Arch of Hadrian (Arco d'Adriano)

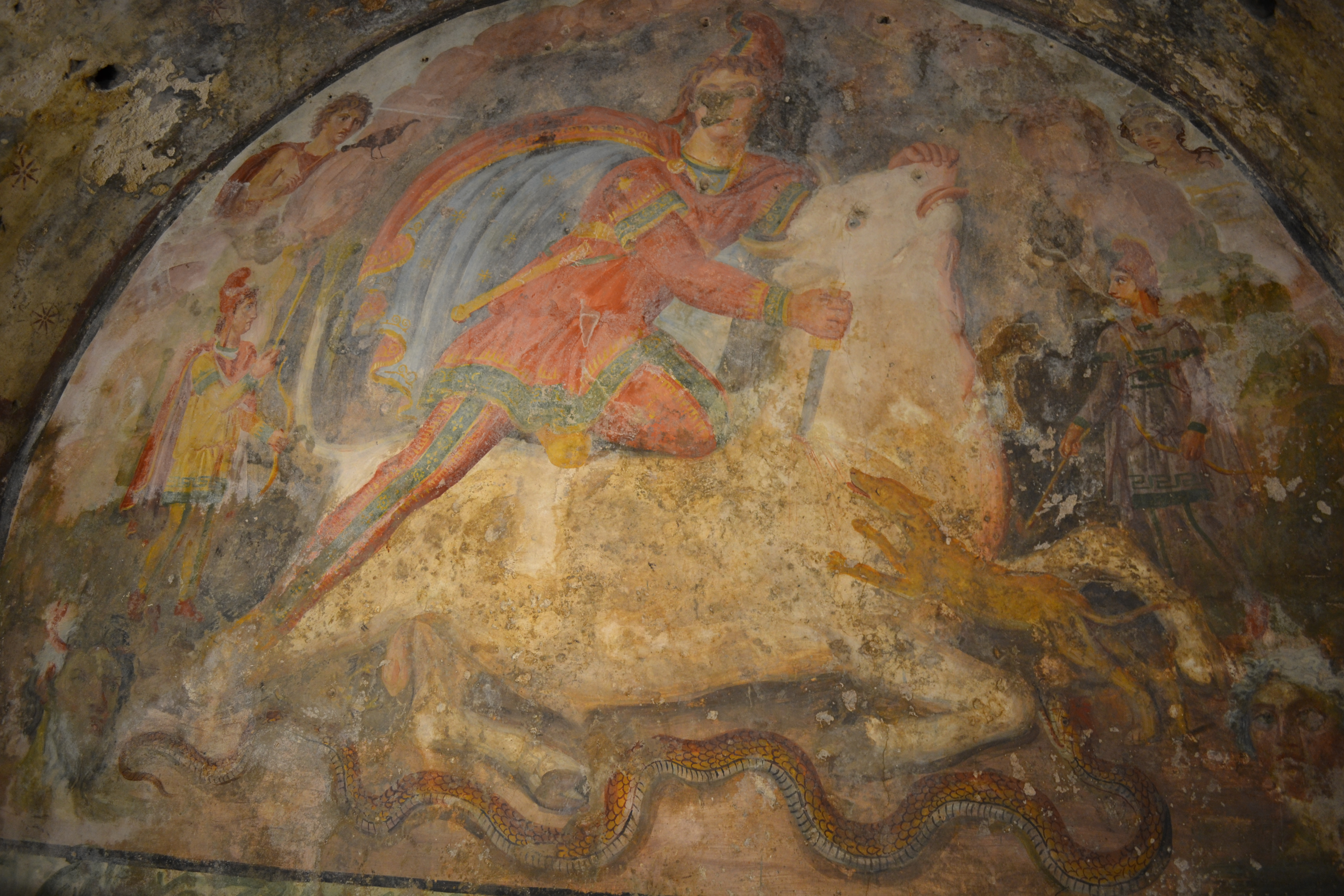
Tauroctony fresco in the mithraeum, 2nd century

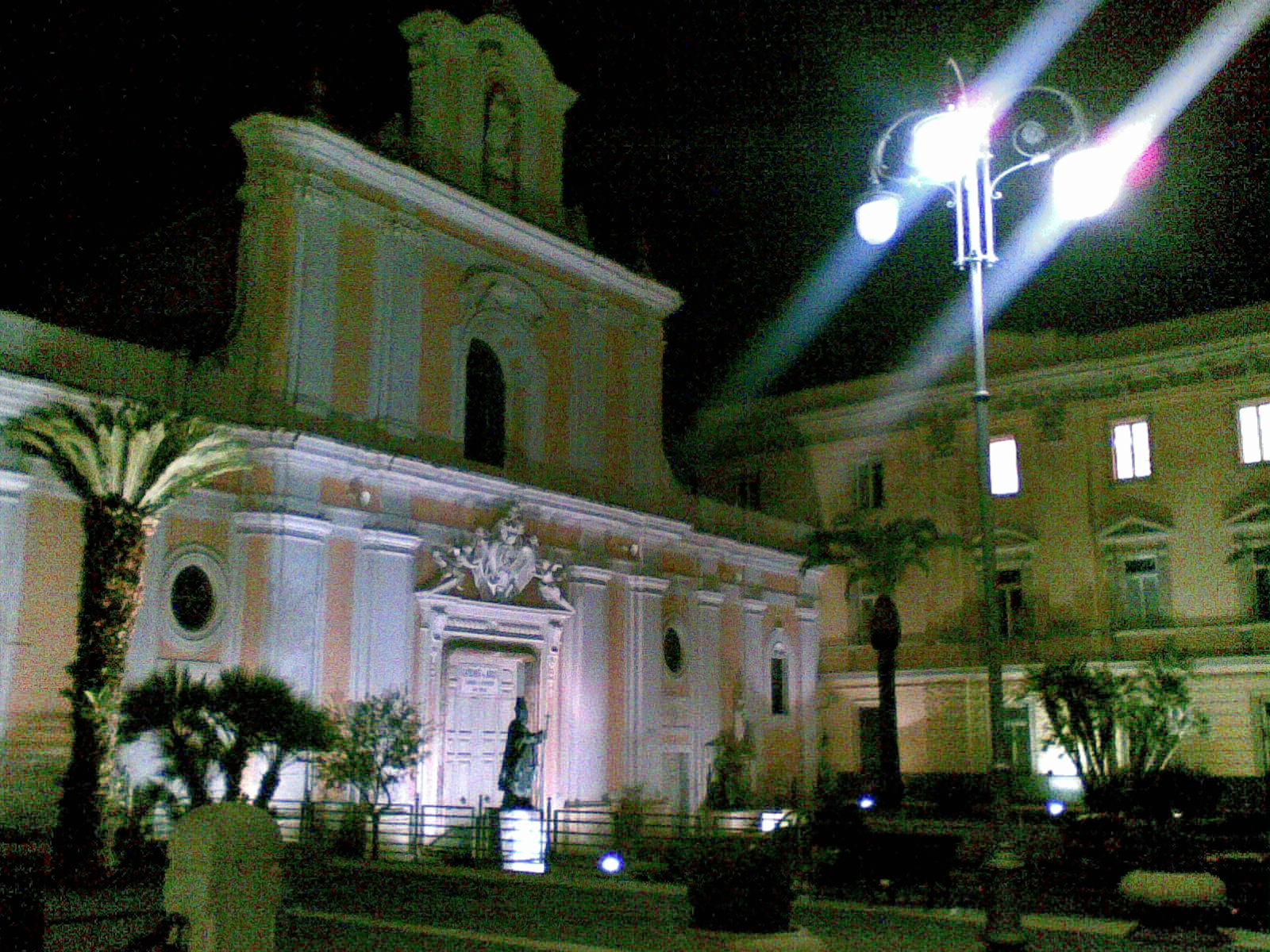
Basilica di Santa Maria Maggiore

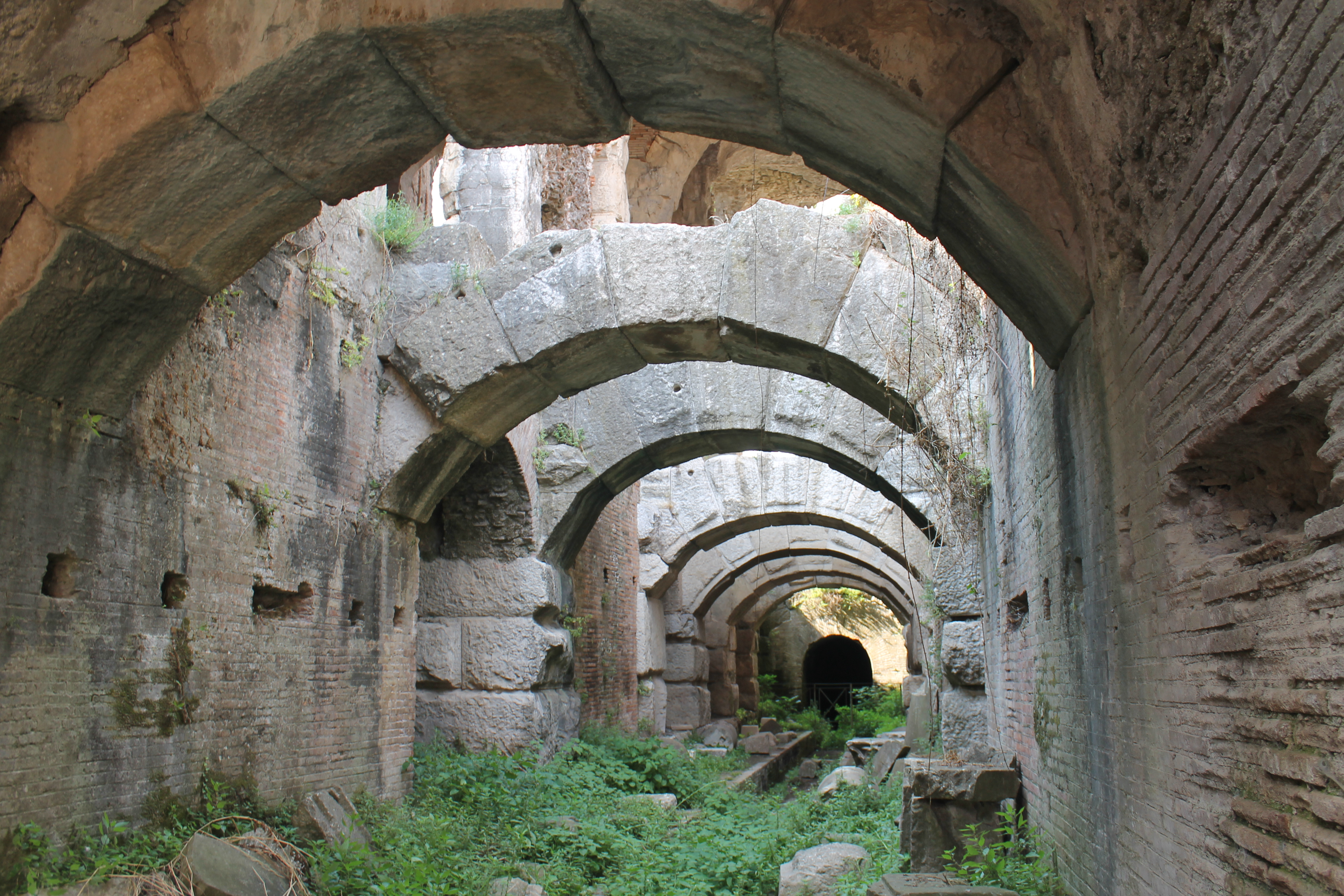
Underground tunnels in the amphitheatre

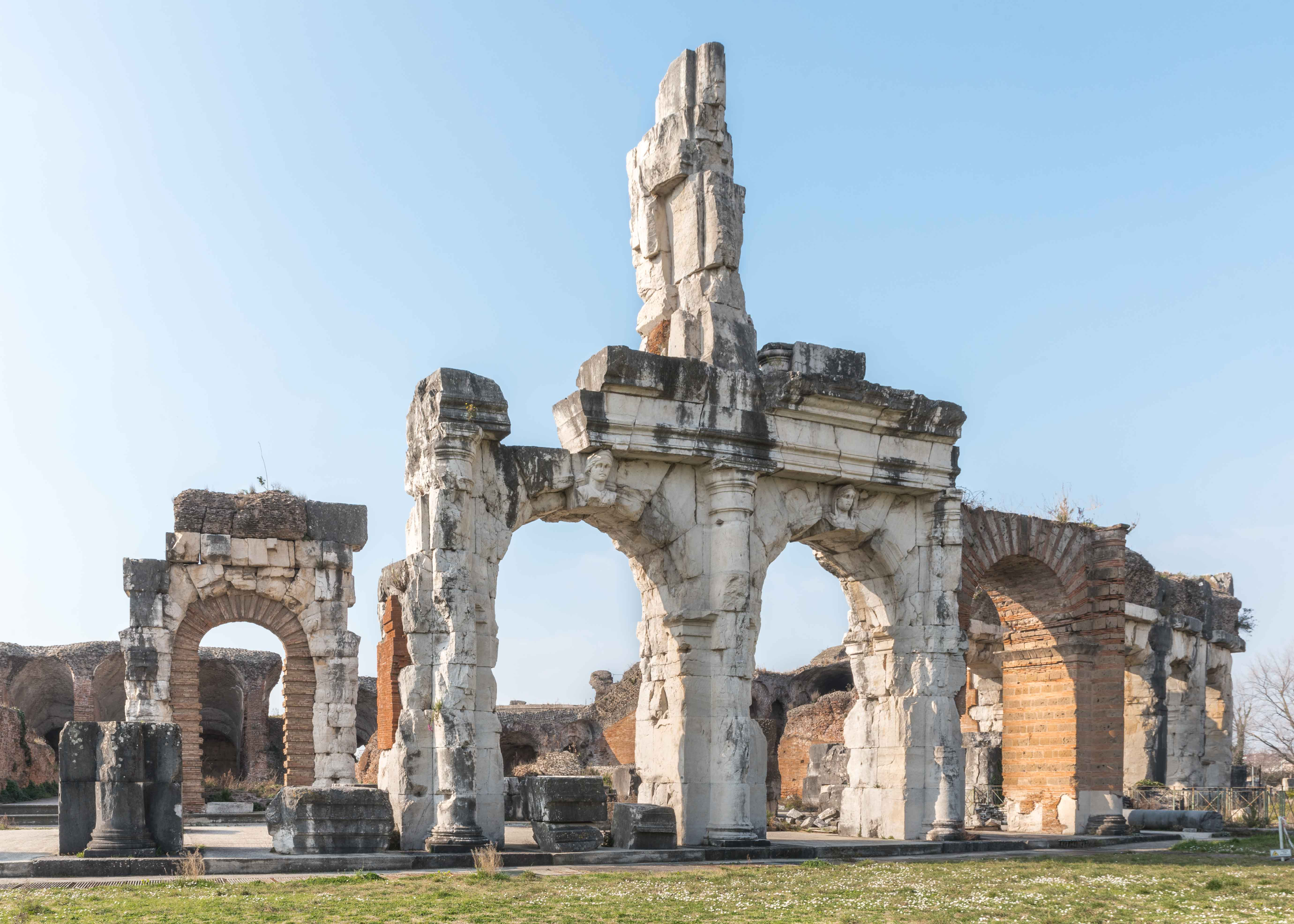
Marble arches (amphitheathre)

== Sport ==
The main city football club is Gladiator 1924 which played in Serie C.

== Traditions ==
Every year on the 14th of August the city celebrates its patron Saint, the Beata Vergine Maria Assunta, with a procession through the city and a pyrotechnical spectacle on the bell tower: the Incendio del campanile (Fire of the bell tower). The first mentions of this celebrations come from the XV century vistits by the sovreigns of Aragon.

== People ==
- Marcello Trotta, footballer, was born here.
- Pina Picierno is a member and Vice President of the European Parliament.
- Errico Malatesta was an Italian anarchist, social and political activist, writer and revolutionary.
- Frank Matano, Italian actor, presenter and voice actor.
- Nicola Salzillo, sculptor and father of Francisco Salzillo
- Robert of Anjou, King of Naples
- Vibius Virrius, Capuan political figure who led the fight against Rome
- Pacuvius Calavius, Meddix Tuticus (head Magistrate) of Capua during the Second Punic War

== Twin towns ==
- Murcia, Spain

== See also ==
- Seconda Università degli Studi di Napoli
- Bishopric of Capua
- Coinage of Capua
