= Coinage of Capua =

Coinage of Capua, Italy

Uncia
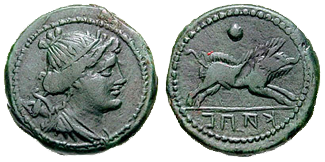
First side of the image: Bust of Diana, bow and quiver over left shoulder.
Second side of the image: Boar at right; dot at top (indication of value). In exergue (KAPU) Oscan alphabet.
Æ, 7,09 fake specimen

The coinage of Capua concerns coins minted in ancient Capua, a city in ancient Campania, corresponding to present-day Santa Maria Capua Vetere. The city was located on the Appian Way and was the most important in the area, probably the largest center in the Italian peninsula after Rome.

During the Second Punic War, in 216 B.C. after the Battle of Cannae, the city chose to side with the Carthaginians. It was during this period that coins were minted bearing the city's name, KAPU, with letters of the Oscan alphabet and with mirror script.

After Hannibal's departure, the city returned to Roman occupation, permanently ceasing minting and later using Roman coinage centered on the denarius.

Capua, unlike other communities in the area, had not previously issued coinage because, after its deditio to Rome in 343 B.C., in order to defend itself against the Samnites, it had become to all intents and purposes Roman and therefore did not use coins of its own.

Traditionally numismatists treat the coins of Capua within the framework of Greek coinage.

== Cataloging ==
There is a study by Jean-Baptiste Giard, published in 1965 among the proceedings of the International Congress of Numismatics held in Rome in 1961. The text is scarcely available and therefore not generally used in auction catalogs. It is cited as Giard, Monnaie, followed by the number.

One text used is that of Rutter et al., Historia Numorum Italy, which deals with all the ancient non-Roman coinage of the Italian peninsula. The coins of Capua are numbered 479 to 510. In this text the references are to Giard, given as "Giard, 'Capoue' and number."

Also used is one published by Arthur Sambon, a French scholar, entitled Les monnaies antiques de l'Italie, and published in Paris in 1903. The book deals, despite the title, with only part of ancient Italy, namely central Italy and Campania. The coins pertinent to Capua are numbered from 1021 to 1052. Also considered among the Capuan (or Campanian) coins are coins that according to more recent authors are perhaps not attributable to this city.

Other sources for cataloging are the Sylloge Nummorum Graecorum. Used are generally the most recent or most widely available ones, such as that of the American Numismatic Society, that of Copenhagen, and that of France. Also used for bronzes is the Sylloge of the Morcom Collection, a collection of bronzes from the Greek West, located in Great Britain. In the catalogs there is an abbreviated indication of the Sylloge, e.g., "ANS," "Cop.," "France," or "Morcom" followed by the number of the coin depicted.

== Historical context ==
Ancient Campania

The city of Capua stood on the site of present-day Santa Maria Capua Vetere and was considered one of the largest cities in ancient Italy, after Rome. The city, founded by the Etruscans in the first quarter of the fifth century BC, was located on the Appian Way and was the most important one in the area.

In the 4th century BC, the city became the object of the aims of the Samnites, who laid siege to it. Capua then sent an embassy to Rome requesting its protection, but the Roman Senate, which had previously concluded a treaty of non-belligerence with the Samnites, was forced to reject this proposal. The ambassadors of the Campanian city, moved by desperation, then decided to surrender the entire city, its inhabitants, fields, possessions and everything of theirs, into the hands of Rome (deditio), so as to force it to commit itself morally to its defense against the Samnite aggressor. In this way the city thus became Roman and forced Rome to agree to intervene in its defense, initiating the first Samnite war. This was in 343 BC.

With the Second Punic War, Capua, along with cities such as Atella, Calatia, and others, came over to Hannibal's side in 216 B.C. after the Battle of Cannae. The Carthaginian army settled in the city and turned it into an important military and political outpost. As the ruling political class and the Capuan population supported Hannibal's military campaign, a series of bronze coins were minted. In 212 and 211 BC. Capua suffered two long sieges by the Romans, so much so that Hannibal, in an attempt to relieve the Roman pressure, pushed his army as far as under the walls of Rome, in the area of Porta Collina. After Hannibal's departure in 211 B.C., the city was finally conquered by the Romans, and many Campanian senators, that is, from Capua, took their own lives with poison rather than fall captive into the hands of the enemy. Others, despite the contrary opinion of the Roman Senate, were killed by Gnaeus Fulvius at Cales and Teanum Sidicinum.

== Monetary context ==
Coins in the name of Capua (KAPU in the Oscan alphabet) were minted during the Second Punic War in one of the few cities in Italy that decided to ally with Hannibal. The context is that of Punic coinage in Italy during that war.

Shortly before the outbreak of the Second Punic War, in 218 B.C., gold and silver coinage from the Greek colonies on the Italian peninsula had ceased, and finds indicate a significant penetration of Rome's silver, linked to increasing production, as far as southern Campania.

With the arrival of Hannibal, some communities, having broken relations with Rome, minted coinage in all three metals to finance their expenses. In Campania these communities were, besides Capua, the cities of Atella and Calatia. These cities minted coins with indications of value in the same manner as was in use in Rome and, earlier, in the other centers of central Italy. Of the three cities, only Capua issued precious metal coins.

At the same time Tarentum and Metapontum, which had not minted since about 240 BC, also began minting again. These centers struck silver coins with a monetary foot similar to the Punic shekel.

In southern Italy there were other issues: the coinage of the Bruttians, that of the Lucanians, Petelia and Cosentia. In addition to these there are the Punic issues of southwestern Italy, the location of which is still being studied.

There is also a series of coins with the legend ΚΑΜΠΑΝΟΣ, which in the past some scholars have linked to Capua, but whose location is uncertain. These are two staters with the man-headed bull, that is, a bull with a human face, on the reverse and bearing on the obverse, the first, the head of a female deity and the other Athena. This coinage is dated to the period 415-405 BCE.

== Numismatics ==
Eckhel in Doctrina numorum veterum shows doubts about the attribution to Capua of the coins with the legend ΚΑΜΠΑΝΟΣ by treating them separately; he assigns with certainty to the city the coins with Oscan legends.

Julius Friedländer, in his text devoted to coins with legends in the Oscan alphabet, attributes one silver and many bronze coins to Capua. He also considers coins with ROMA and ROMANO legends "without doubt" to have been minted in Capua. He makes no dating assumptions for bronzes with Oscan legends.

B.V. Head attributes Capua - while expressing uncertainty - to Roman-Campanian coinage, the Greek-style coins struck in the name of Rome. Head also divides the bronze coins into two periods: one group of coins he considers to be prior to 268 B.C., the other to be dated after the same date, and only the silver coinage is attributed to the period of the Second Punic War. The anepigraphic coin in electrum with a female Janiform head on the obverse, previously attributed to Capua, is rightly dated to the period when Capua had revolted against Rome, while also noting that there was no reason to attribute it to Capua itself but should be included in the Punic coinage of southern Italy.

Arthur Sambon cites the opinions of some numismatists (Babelon, Lenormant, Millingen, Raoul Rochette, and Mommsen) who attributed the production of the Roman-Campanian coins to Capua. This attribution was confirmed by Haeberlin in his Die Systematik des ältesten römischen Münzwesen of 1905. Sambon decided to deal exclusively with the coinage with the Oscan legend. On these coins he notes the contiguity with the coins of the Bruttians and Apulia. On the dating, however, Sambon maintains the hypothesis that these are largely coins minted from the First Punic War and only the electrum coins with the two-faced head on the obverse and Jupiter standing on the quadriga (Sambon 1050, HN Italy 2013), are to be dated during the Second Punic War and before 211 BC, when Capua was reconquered by the Romans.

Rutter et al. in Historia Numorum Italy, date all of Capua's coinage during the Second Punic War, associating it with those of other communities that sided with Hannibal. Two of these communities, Atella and Calatia, were located near Capua. Others included Tarentum, Metapontum, the Lucanians, and the Bruttians. In addition to these Italic and Italiote communities Rutter et al. associate the "Carthaginian coins of southern Italy," a group of coins whose exact place of minting is unclear and which are associated with Hannibal's stay in Italy.

Catalli shares the same opinion and dates the Capua coinage to the Second Punic War, at the same time as the issues of the communities already mentioned.

== Coins ==
The coins that are definitely from Capua are those with the name of the city (KAPU) written in the Oscan alphabet with mirror writing, that is, from right to left. Most of these coins are made of bronze and bear an indication of value. There are also some coins whose attribution to Capua is less certain, such as the gold series that seems to use the numismatic foot of the Attic drachma.

=== Electrum ===
3/8 of a shekel
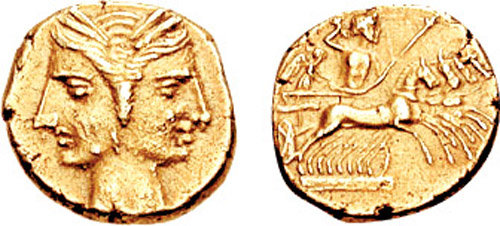
EL, 2,79 g; HN Italy 2013

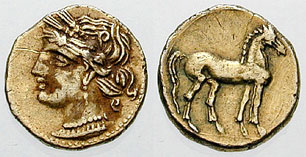

EL, 2,74 g; HN Italy 2014

There are electrum coins, a natural alloy of gold and silver with varying proportions, which had been attributed by some authors to Capua but are now considered within the coinage struck by the Carthaginians in southern Italy during the Second Punic War. These are essentially two types: one with a Janiform head and the other with the head of Demeter-Tanit.

The first type (HN Italy 2013) features a Janiform female head crowned with wheat on the obverse, as mentioned above, and the reverse depicts Jupiter, with thunderbolt and scepter, on a quadriga led by Victoria. This coin takes up the types of the Roman quadrigatus. It has been identified as a Punic coin by Gardner based on both the lack of legend and the exact correspondence as to weight and title with Carthaginian coins in electrum.

The other type (HN Italy 2014) features on the obverse the head of Demeter-Tanit turned to the left. The deity wears a crown made up of ears of corn; behind the head is sometimes the letter Α (alpha). Tanit was the most important goddess in Carthage and appeared on most Punic coins. The reverse depicts a horse standing or in a walking pose facing to the right. Sometimes there is a symbol (bow) in the exergue. The types and style of this coin are characteristic of the coinage of Carthage. The association of this coin with the previous one is in Robinson NC 1964.

In both cases these are 3/8 shekel pieces, weighing about 2.75 grams.

=== Gold ===
There is a gold drachma (HN Italy 479, SNG ANS 145) whose attribution to Capua is not certain. On the obverse it has the head of Ceres with a crown of wheat and on the reverse Victoria driving a swift chariot. Below the exergue line is the letter kappa, the element that would justify the attribution to Capua. Similar types are found in the coinage of Syracuse, particularly during the reign of Hiero II.

=== Silver ===
The only silver coin definitely struck in Capua is a didrachm containing the legend (KAPU mirrored in the Oscan alphabet).

This coin (Sambon 1021; HN Italy 480) features on the obverse the laureate head of Jupiter, turned to the right.

The reverse depicts an eagle with open wings above a lightning bolt. On the right of the eagle is vertically the legend already seen (KAPU).

The weight is between 5.5 and 6 grams.

=== Bronze ===
Bronze coinage constitutes the bulk of Capua's coinage. Almost all the coins bear the demonym. The coins are articulated on an as divided into 10 unciae. Three periods followed one another over time; the transition from one to the other is given by the reduction in the weight of the pieces.

Most of the coins bear an indication of value, mostly by means of a number of roundels equal to the number of unciae. In some pieces the value is indicated by stars instead of roundels.

Four coins (HN Italy 495, 500, 507, and 508) have a symbol variously described by the authors: triple knot, tripod-shaped. The meaning is unclear.

Sambon does not differentiate between the coins catalogued as HN Italy 482 and 497, which have the same types, and catalogues them together as Sambon 1024, although he notes the considerable differences in weights between the various specimens examined: one group varies between 32.55 and 33.9 grams, while the other varies between 18 and 22.5 grams.

For the coins without indication, the value is uncertain. Sambon speculates the value of a half-uncia and Rutter et al. also lean toward this hypothesis.

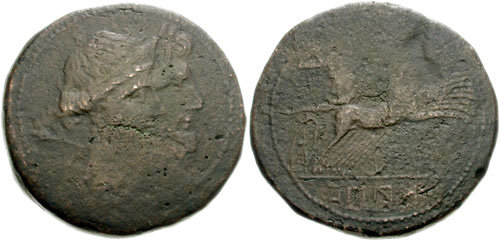
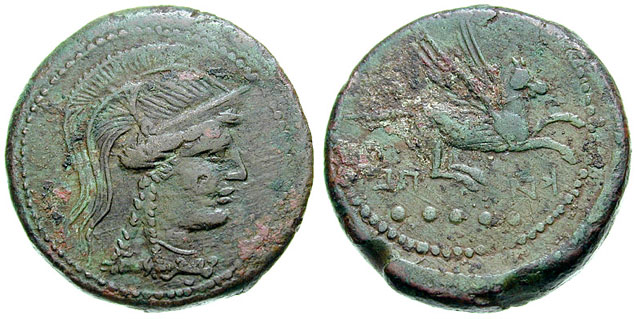
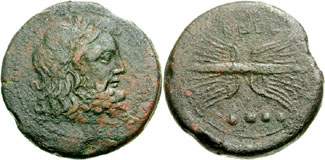
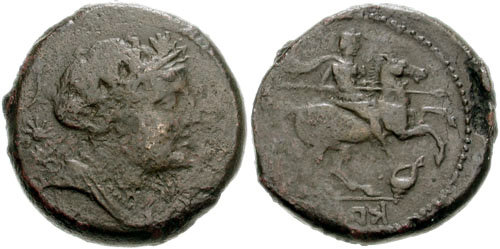
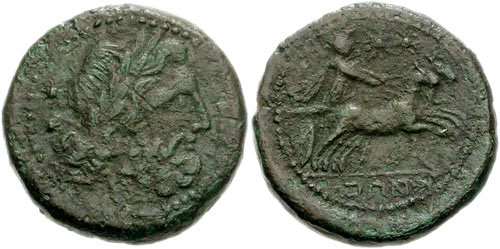
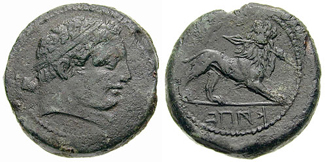
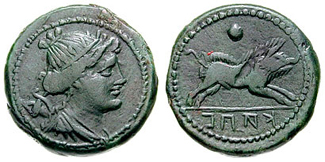
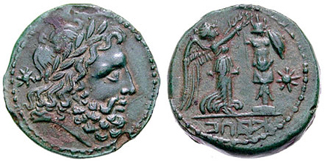
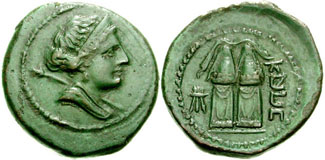
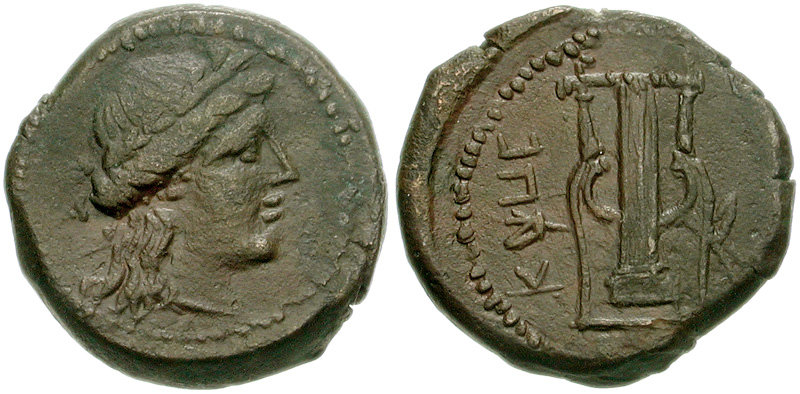
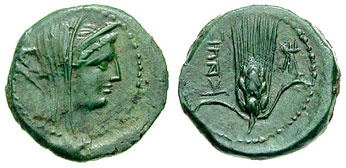
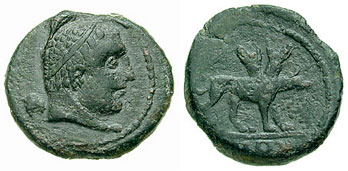
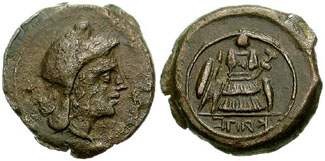
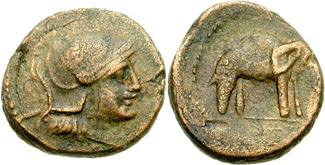
First period
Image	Value	Obverse	Reverse	Weight; diameter	Cataloging
	As	Collared heads of Juno and Jupiter turned to the right; Juno has a scepter on her left shoulder and bears a diadem on her head; Jupiter's head is laureate.	Jupiter standing on a quadriga galloping. In his left hand he holds a scepter and with his raised right hand throws a thunderbolt. In exergue KAPU.	41-66 g; 38 mm (42,56 g)	HN Italy 481, Sambon 1022
	Quincunx	Head of Minerva turned to the right. Wears Attic helmet with long crest. On the helmet in addition to the crest, plumes.	Pegasus flying to the right; below KAPU and value indication.	26-34 g; 30 mm (26,16 g)	HN Italy 482, Sambon 1024
	Quadrunx	Laureate head of Jupiter, value below.	Winged lightning bolt; above KAPU and below value indication.	23-27 g; 30 mm (24,48 g)	HN Italy 483, Sambon 1025
	Teruncius	Head of Ceres, with crown of ears of corn.	Bull; in exergue KAPU and above value indication.	15-20 g; 25 mm	HN Italy 484, Sambon 1027
	Biunx	Head of Fortuna, with turreted crown decorated with lightning; at left two stars, indicating value.	Horseman with lance, on horse forcené; murex shell underneath, two stars behind, indicating value; in exergue KAPU.	13-17 g; 25 mm	HN Italy 485, Sambon 1028
	Biunx	Laureate head of Jupiter, facing right. On left, behind head, two stars, indicating value.	Eagle turned right on lightning bolt, head turned back and wings spread. On both sides two eight-rayed stars, indicating value and in exergue KAPU.	11-16 g; 23 mm	HN Italy 486, Sambon 1029
	Biunx	Laureate head of Jupiter, facing right. On left, behind head, two stars, indicating value.	Two soldiers, facing each other, the right hand of both armed with gladius, swearing an oath over a young swine which they both hold in their left hands; in the field, on the left the indication of value by means of two stars and in the exergue KAPU.	13-16 g; 25 mm	HN Italy 487, Sambon 1030
	Biunx	Laureate head of Jupiter, facing right. On left, behind head, two stars, indicating value.	Diana Tifatina leading a swift biga, running to the right; at top two stars, indicating value, in exergue KAPU.	10,5-17 g; 23 mm	HN Italy 488, Sambon 1032
	Biunx	Youthful haloed head of Hercules facing right; a club on his left shoulder.	Passing lion, snout in front, a spear in its mouth, held in place by its left paw; at top value indication and in exergue KAPU.	10-15 g; 23 mm (14,0 g)	HN Italy 489, Sambon 1031
	Uncia	Head of Fortune facing right; girded with a turreted crown decorated with lightning; under the neck a star indicating value, a strigil behind.	Knight in cuirass and chlamys facing right with lance in rest on horse; on left a star indicating value and on right a shell, in exergue KAPU.	7-10 g; 21 mm	HN Italy 490, Sambon 1035
	Uncia	Head of Minerva turned to the right, wearing a Corinthian helmet with double welt; behind, as an indication of value, a star.	Victoria going left, nude bust holding in extended right arm a crown and in left hand a bandage; in front, as an indication of value, a star, in exergue KAPU.	6-9 g; 20 mm	HN Italy 491, Sambon 1033
	Uncia	Head of Diana facing right, with myrtle wreath, bow, and quiver; value indication behind: a roundel or star.	Running boar to right, value indication above: a roundel; in exergue KAPU.	6-10 g; 20 mm (7,09 g)	HN Italy 492, Sambon 1034
	Uncia	Laureate head of Jupiter turned right, behind a star, indication of value.	Victoria standing facing right crowning a trophy of arms; at right star and in exergue KAPU.	6-12 g; 20 mm (7,20 g)	HN Italy 493, Sambon 1037
	Uncia	Laureate head of Jupiter, facing right. On the left, behind the head, a star, indication of value.	Diana Tifatina leading a swift biga, running to the right; at top a star, indication of value, in exergue KAPU.	7,4 g; 21 mm	HN Italy 494, Sambon —
	Semuncia	Head of Juno turned right, scepter on shoulder, haloed and adorned with jewels.	Two xoana, gathered on a common base, veiled; a bandage is laid over the two heads. On the left is a symbol (triple knot); on the right, vertically, KAPU.	4,5-7,5 g; 18 mm (6,48 g)	HN Italy 495, Sambon 1038
Second period
	As	Juvenile Janiform head, without beard	Jupiter standing on a quadriga galloping. In his left hand he holds a scepter and with his raised right hand throws a thunderbolt. In exergue KAPU.	35,1-46,6 g; 36 mm	HN Italy 496, Sambon 1023
	Quincunx	Head of Minerva turned to the right. Wears Attic helmet with long crest. On the helmet in addition to the crest, plumes.	Pegasus flying to the right; KAPU and value indication below.	17-22 g; 30 mm	HN Italy 497, Sambon 1024
	Æ Biunx	Helmeted head of Minerva facing right.	Eagle turned left on lightning bolt; at left KAPU.	3,7 g; 15 mm	HN Italy 498, Sambon –
	Æ semuncia (?)	Laureate head of Apollo, facing right.	Lyre with belt; on left KAPU.	3-5 g; 16 mm (4,71 g)	HN Italy 499, Sambon 1041
	Æ semuncia (?)	Veiled and haloed head of Juno facing right, holding a scepter on her shoulder.	Ear of wheat with two leaves; in the field on the left KAPU and on the right "triple knot"	3-5,5 g; 16 mm (3,27 g)	HN Italy 500, Sambon 1040
	Æ semuncia (?)	Beardless head of Hercules turned right, a club behind his neck.	Doe turned right nursing young Telephus and turning head toward child. In right field "triple knot" and in exergue KAPU.	4,5 g; 14 mm	HN Italy 501, Sambon 1045
	Æ semuncia (?)	Head of beardless and haloed Hercules, facing right; a club behind his neck.	Cerberus facing right. In exergue KAPU.	3,5-4,5 g; 15 mm (3,10 g)	HN Italy 502, Sambon 1044
Third period
	As	Laureate head of Jupiter, facing right.	Eagle turned right on lightning bolt, with open wings; in exergue KAPU.	11-28 g; 34 mm	HN Italy 503, Sambon –
	Quincunx	Laureate head of Jupiter, facing right.	Eagle turned right on lightning bolt, with open wings; on the right, as an indication of value, a crescent, i.e. 1/2 (of as); in exergue KAPU.	12-14 g; 25 mm	HN Italy 504, Sambon –
	Uncia	Laureate head of Jupiter turned right, star behind, indication of value.	Victoria standing facing right crowning a trophy of arms; on right a star and in exergue KAPU.	3,5 g; 20 mm	HN Italy 505, Sambon 1037
	Uncia	Youthful head of Pan turned right, pedum on shoulder.	Wild boar running to the right. At top roundel, value indication. Demonym is missing.	2 g; 15 mm	HN Italy 506, Sambon 1043
	Æ (semuncia?)	Head of Juno turned right, scepter on shoulder, haloed and adorned with jewels.	Winged lightning bolt; at top triple knot and at bottom KAPU	1,5-2 g; 13 mm	HN Italy 507, Sambon 1048
	Æ (semuncia?)	Head of Telephus facing right, wearing Phrygian cap	Doe toward right turning head back and suckling young Telephus; in exergue KAPU, at times, in field, triple knot.	1-2,5 g; 13 mm	HN Italy 508, Sambon 1046
	Æ (semuncia?)	Head of Telephus facing right, wearing Phrygian cap	Trophy; in exergue KAPU.	1-2 g; 13 mm (1,82 g)	HN Italy 509, Sambon 1049
	Æ (semuncia?)	Head of Minerva facing right, with Attic helmet	Elephant facing right; in exergue KAPU	1-3 g (2,24 g)	HN Italy 510, Sambon 1047
N.B.: measurements are according to Rutter et al., HN Italy, pp. 64–66. In parentheses the weight of the specimen shown.

== Findings ==
Thompson et al. (An Inventory of Greek Coin Hoards, IGCH) indicate three treasures containing coins from Capua and three treasures found in Capua. Only one treasure, IGCH 1962, is present in both groups.

Coins of Capua
IGCH	Location	Date found	Burial date (B.C.)	Quantity of Capua coins and metal	Other coins
1962	Capua	1855	280	1 Æ	88 AR Southern Italy; 2 aes grave. According to Thompson et al. the bronzes are a spurious addition.
2051	Città Sant'Angelo	1925	150 ca.	1 Æ	146 AR and 3165 Æ of which only 9 are non-Roman.
2187	Sicily	??	Early 3rd century	3 Æ?	169 AR and 32 AE, the relevance of which is uncertain.
Only one coin from Capua is certain to belong to the treasury, the one found in Città Sant'Angelo. Such a small figure does not allow for further elaboration.
Treasures discovered in Capua
1941	Capua	1925	4th century	–	4 AR of Neapolis and Phistelia
1962	Capua	1855	280	1 Æ	88 AR Southern Italy; 2 aes grave. According to Thompson et al. the bronzes are a spurious addition.
2010	Capua	1857	225 ca.	–	35 AR (2 staters from Neapolis and 33 quadrigati from Rome)

These findings can give an idea of the coins that circulated in Capua before the Second Punic War.

== Legends and epigraphy ==

The coins have the same legend with the name of the city in the Oscan alphabet. The inscription is mirrored, that is, the text runs from right to left.

While the πόλεις normally used the name of the inhabitants in the genitive plural, the use of the city name was more common in the issues of the cities of Italy.

The Oscan or Umbrian alphabet are used by several cities, even under Roman rule, such as Iguvium, Tuder, and Teanum.

The value indication is typical of the coinage of the non-Greek populations of Italy: Romans, Italics, Etruscans. For the most valuable coins, Roman numbers were used, while for fractions of the as the value was expressed by means of roundels or dots equal to the number of unciae that constituted the value of the coin.

In this coinage, stars with the same meaning are also flanked in place of roundels.

The description of the symbol found in the less valuable bronzes is not unambiguous: Sambon merely reports it graphically, Rutter et al. call it triple knot. On some auction catalogs it is mentioned "tripod-shaped object." The meaning is unclear. It is in any case present only in coins without value indication.

== Weights and alloys ==
The gold drachma, whose attribution to Capua is however uncertain, has a weight of 4.26 g.

The silver didrachm with the head of Jupiter has a weight between 5.5 and 6 grams.

Bronze coins, as already seen, are built around an as with a value of 10 unciae.

The first period has an as with a weight ranging between 41 and 65 grams, in the second period the as varies between 35 and 46.5 while the as of the third period ranges between 22 and 28 grams.

== See also ==
- Capua
- Ancient Greek coinage
- Ancient Campania

== Bibliography ==
- Catalli, Fiorenzo. Monete dell'Italia antica. Roma: IPZS. ISBN 88-240-3977-4.
- Friedländer, Julius (1850). Die oskischen Münzen (in German). Lipsia: In commission bei G. Wigand. pp. 7–22.
- Francesco Daniele (1802). Monete antiche di Capua. Napoli.
- Giard, Jean-Baptiste (1965). Le monnaie de Capoue et le problems de la datation du denier romain. Congresso internazionale di numismatica, Roma, 11-19 settembre 1961. Roma. pp. 235–259.
- Head, Barclay Vincent (1911). Historia Numorum: a Manual of Greek Numismatics (2nd ed.). London: Oxford.
- Rutter, Keith N. (1997). Greek coinages of Southern Italy and Sicily. London: Spink. ISBN 0-907605-82-6.
- Rutter, Keith N. (2001). Historia Numorum - Italy. London: British Museum Press. ISBN 0-7141-1801-X.
- Sambon, Arthur (1966) [1903]. Les Monnaies antiques d'Italie (in French). Parigi: Bureaux du "Musée". ISBN 978-88-271-0107-0. ristampa Forni.
- Margaret Thompson, Otto Mørkholm e Colin M. Kraay, ed. (1973). An Inventory of Greek Coin Hoards. comunemente citato come IGCH. New York: ANS.

=== Collections ===
- Joan E. Fisher, ed. (1969). SNG American Numismatic Society Part 1: Etruria-Calabria. New York: American Numismatic Society.
- Willy Schwabacher - Niels Breitenstin, ed. (1981). SNG Copenhagen, Vol. One: Italy, Sicily. Copenhagen: Danish National Museum.
- Anna Rita Parente, ed. (2003). SNG France, Vol. 6, Part 1: Italie (Étrurie-Calabre) (in French). Parigi: Bibliotèque Nationale de France / Numismatica Ars Classica.
