= Arch of Hadrian =

The Arch of Hadrian may refer to:

- Arch of Hadrian (Athens) in Greece
- Arch of Hadrian (Capua) in Italy
- Arch of Hadrian (Jerash) in Jordan.
