= Nicolás Salzillo =

- Born: July 13, 1672; Santa Maria Capua Vetere
- Died: October 6, 1727 (aged 55); Murcia
- Known for: Sculptor

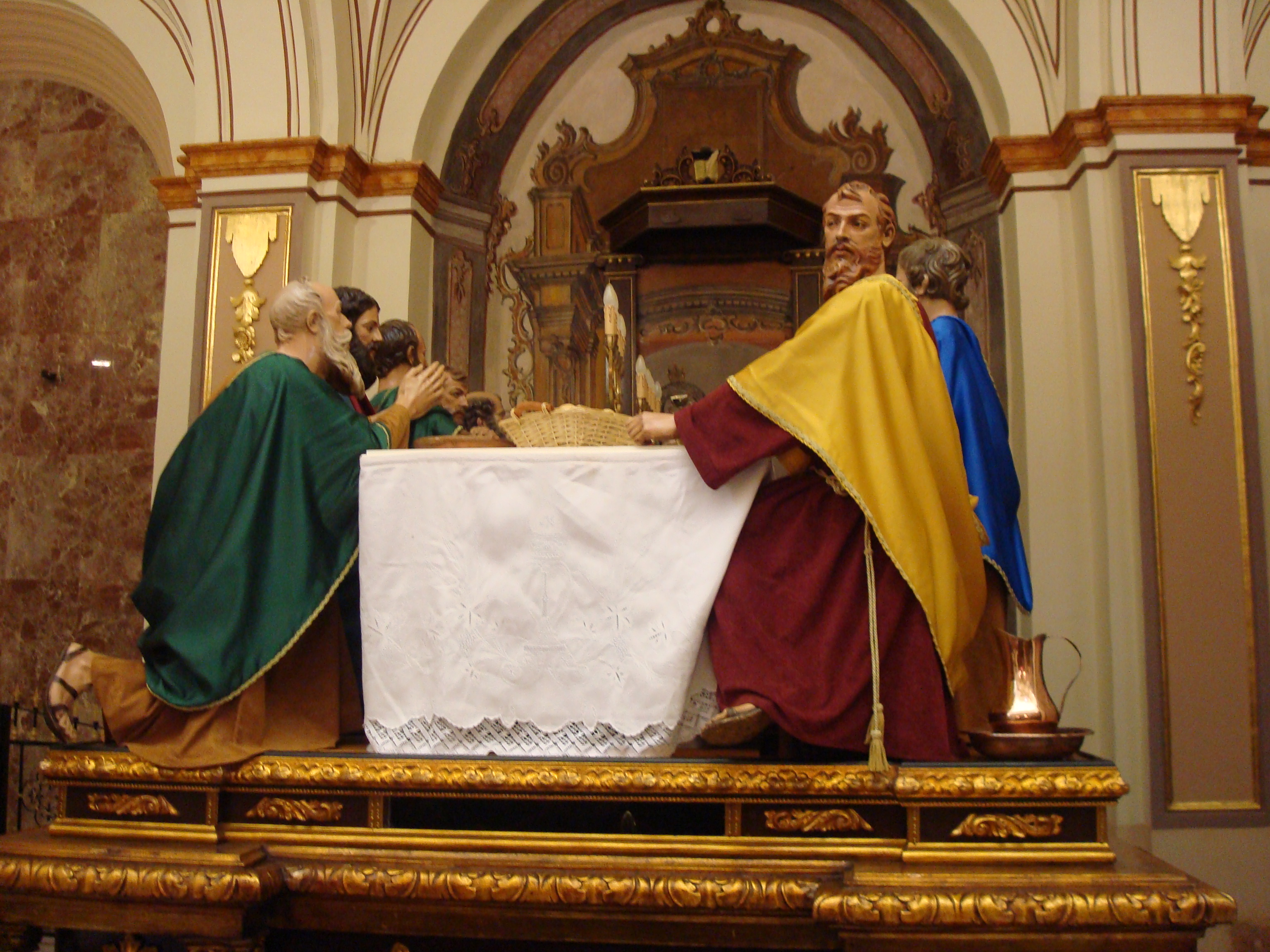

Nicolás Salzillo (born Nicola Salzillo; Santa Maria Capua Vetere, July 13, 1672 - Murcia, October 6, 1727) was an Italian sculptor who from 1699, aged 27, was active in Murcia, Spain. He worked mostly in life-size painted wooden religious sculpture. His son, Francisco Salzillo, was an even more prominent baroque wood sculptor. He was born in Santa Maria Capua Vetere, Italy and died in Murcia.
