= Siege of Capua =

Siege of Capua may refer to:

- Siege of Capua (211 BC)
- Siege of Capua (1024–1026), during the Norman conquest of southern Italy
- Siege of Capua (1098)
- Siege of Capua (1501), during the Italian Wars of 1499–1504
- Siege of Capua (1734)
- Siege of Capua (1860), during the Expedition of the Thousand

== See also ==
- Battle of Capua (disambiguation)
