= Ancient Campania =

Region in what is now Italy

Ancient Campania (often also identified as Campania Felix or ager Campanus) originally indicated the territory of the ancient city of Capua in the Roman period, and later also the plains of the various neighbouring municipalities. It was a very large territory when compared with the other Italic cities of the Roman and pre-Roman period.

== Etymology ==
According to the Roman philologist Sextus Pompeius Festus (II century BC), the pre-Roman name of Campania was Oscor, the name from which the Osci peoples who lived there (Osci enim a Regione Campaniæ, quae est Oscor, vocati sunt.). The toponym Campania, dating back to the fifth century BC, is of classical origin. The most accredited hypothesis is that it derives from the name of the ancient inhabitants of Capua. From Capuani, in fact, we would have Campani and, therefore, Campania; furthermore, both Livio and Polybius speak of an Ager Campanus with a clear reference to Capua and the surrounding area.

== Geography ==
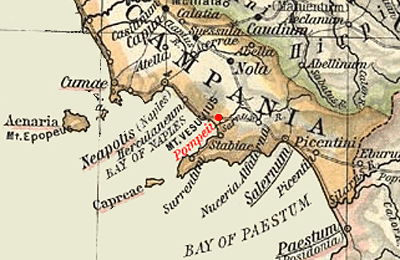
Map of Pompeii in Ancient Campania. William R. Shepherd (1911).

Campania extended from the slopes of Mount Massico (to the north) up to the Phlegraean Fields and the Vesuvian area to the south.

The main inhabited centers of this historical region were (from north to south) Capua, Atella, Liternum, Cumae, Baiae, Puteoli, Acerrae, Nola, Neapolis, Caprae, Oplontis, Pompei, Sorrentum, Stabiae, Nuceria Alfaterna and Salernum. Thanks to the fertility of the soil, also due to the presence of the Volturno river, it earned the name of Campania Felix.

Ancient Campania, closed between the Apennines and the sea, had the Sele river as its boundaries to the south and the Garigliano to the north. According to Pliny the Elder, however, the city of Sinuessa was its boundary.

== History ==
=== Pre-Roman Campania ===
Necropoleis on the edges of modern Santa Maria Capua Vetere suggest the region has been continuously inhabited since the 10th century BCE. Most ancient sources refer to the indigenous peoples of Campania as Ausoni. Settlers from other peoples arrived in subsequent centuries, first mainly the Greeks from Pithekoūsai who founded the colony of Cumae in the mid-8th century, that would dominate the region until the 5th century BCE. The evidence suggests that the city of Capua was founded in the 6th or 5th century BCE by Etruscans, though scholars have not been able to establish an exact date. Several Roman and Greek authors writing centuries later have penned varying and contradictory foundation myths about Capua.

Strabo's Geographica (written in the 1st century BCE or CE) asserted that Capua became the capital of a league of twelve Campanian cities, mirroring the notion that twelve cities in Etruria also formed a league, which may be indicative of such a foundation myth. Ever since Theodor Mommsen (1860), some 19th-century and early-20th-century historians have supposed that there may indeed have been a Campanian or Capuan league or (con)federation of cities from the mid-5th century BCE until 211 BCE, but the evidence from primary sources is poor and contradictory. There is no clear evidence of the membership of this supposed league, let alone of its political institutions and thus how it might have functioned in practice, if it existed. Historian Nikoletta Farkas (2006) concluded that Capua did control quite some rural territory – known as the ager Campanus – beyond its urban centre, but apart from the subordinate city of Atella (and the otherwise unattested Sabatinum), there were no other cities in Campania under its control, and the meddix tuticus appears to have been a local official of Capua, not someone presiding over a council of a (con)federation or league of cities. The name Campania for a geographical region does not appear in Greek and Roman sources until the 2nd century BCE.

Classical sources agree that Samnites conquered Etruscan Capua in 423 BCE, and Greek Cumae in 421 or 420 BCE.

=== 4th century BCE ===
It is uncertain exactly how Capua and the rest of Campania came under the dominion of the Roman Republic. At the beginning of the First Samnite War in 343 BCE, Capua either "surrendered" or "allied" itself to Rome, depending on one's interpretation of Livy's meaning of the word deditio, and how historically reliable his account is. Either way, Capua soon joined other Latin cities in revolting against Rome during the subsequent Latin War (c. 340–338 BCE), but was defeated and became a socius of the Roman Republic, with both obligations and benefits. The inhabitants of Capua received civitas sine suffragio – Roman citizenship without voting rights, meaning they were allowed to trade and intermarry with Romans, and maintained political and legal autonomy. But Capua lost some territory, and was required to supply soldiers to Rome.

=== Roman Campania ===
During the Second Punic War (218–201 BCE), Capua sided with the Carthaginian army under Hannibal against Rome, but was defeated after a long siege by the Romans in 211 BCE, ending in its loss of autonomy.

Initially Campania also included the ager Falernus, then it was heavily downsized by Rome due to the alliance of the city of Capua with Hannibal. The late Roman historian Festus wrote in the 4th century CE that Campania was divided into ten praefecturae, although he does not indicate when this supposedly happened. Franco Sartori (1953) argued for a 318 BCE date, but later scholars Sherwin-White (1973) and Frederiksen (1984) reasoned that the Romans did not regularly appoint praefecti in Capua until 211 BCE, and hence the division of Campania into ten praefecturae should also be dated to that year.

The territory of Campania, together with Latium, became part, in the Augustan subdivision, of the Regio I: Latium et Campania.

=== Middle Ages ===
In the Middle Ages, the toponym Terra Laboris, recorded for the first time in 1092 (although there are doubts about the originality of the document), replaced the name Campania. The new toponym will officially replace the old one in the Norman territorial subdivision. In fact, from the seventh century, due to the prevalence of the Duchy of Naples, the connection between the Latin toponym Campania and what it originally indicated was lost in the language: in an emblematic way, the geographical maps, from about 1500 to 1700, show the indication Terra Laboris olim Campania felix.
