= Battle of Capua =

Battle of Capua may refer to:

- Battle of Capua (212 BC) was between Hannibal and two Roman consular armies
- Battle of Capua (554) was an engagement between the Byzantine forces under Narses against Frankish invaders
- Battle of Capua (1348) was between the troops of Louis I of Hungary and those of the Kingdom of Naples

== See also ==
- Siege of Capua (disambiguation)
