= Beloch =

Beloch is a European surname. Notable people with the surname include:

- Karl Julius Beloch (1854–1929), German classical and economic historian
- Margherita Piazzola Beloch (1879–1976), Italian mathematician, daughter of Karl

== See also ==
- Baloch (surname)
