= Arch of Hadrian (Capua) =

Coordinates: 41°05′02″N 14°14′52″E

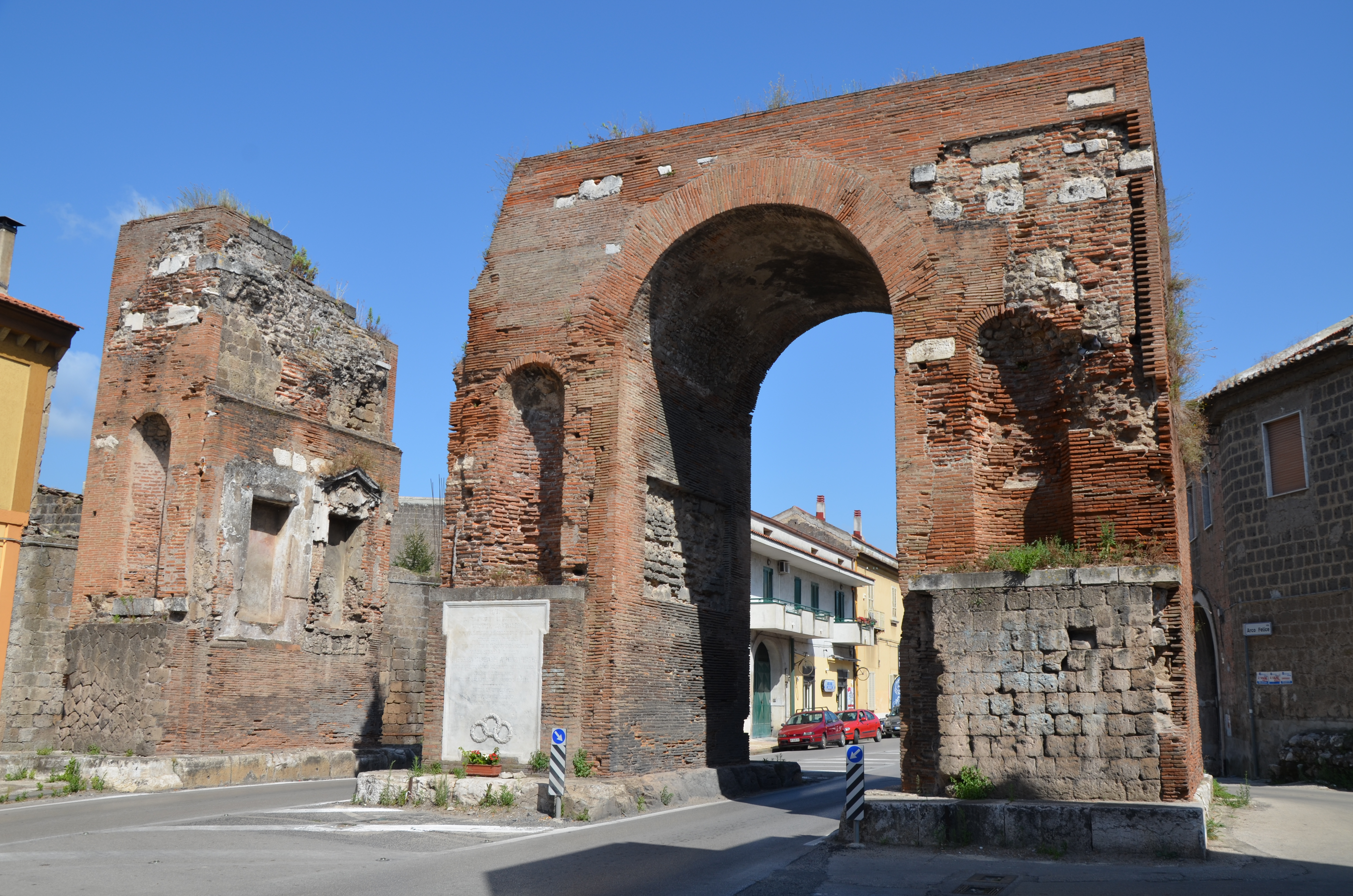
Arch of Hadrian in ancient Capua.

The Arch of Hadrian (also called the "Arches of Capua" or the "Lucky Arch") is an ancient Roman triumphal arch located in Santa Maria Capua Vetere (ancient Capua, now in the Province of Caserta, southern Italy). It was originally a triple arch, but today only three pylons and one of the lateral arches survive. It spanned the Appian Way and constituted an ideal entrance to the city, perhaps corresponding to the line of the pomerium.

== History ==
The arch was erected between the latter half of the 1st century and the former half of the 2nd century, but we are ignorant of its dedication. An inscription was reported, with a dedication to the Emperor Hadrian, later determined to be false. A dedication to Septimius Severus was also dubiously reported (CIL X, 3825), but this probably belonged to the podium of a statue.

It was hypothesised that the arch's erection occurred under the Flavian dynasty after the gift of the status of colonia to the city (along with the name Colonia Flavia Augusta).

There was a restoration, with additions and reconstructions of the lateral structure in 1851.

In 1860, it was involved in combat in the Battle of Volturnus: a commemorative plaque, with text written by Luigi Settembrini is located on one of the arch's pylons. Later, after 1893, the damage sustained during the battle was restored. Further restorations took place in both 1945 and 1953–1955 as a result of damage suffered in the Second World War.

== Description ==
The arch is located between the Corso Moro and Via del Lavoro and is also known as the Arco di Adriano or Archi di Capua.

The arch is constructed in brick (opus latericium) and originally had an outer coating of white limestone, now lost. The pylons of the central vault remain and one of the lateral arches. The remains extend to a height of 10 metres and a width of 18.5 metres. There are modern extensions and restorations.

The arches of the central vault and of the lateral vaults were of a moderate height (6.2 metres), but that of the central arch was wider (an opening of 4.85 metres versus an opening of 3.95 metres for the lateral arches) and it originally reached to a greater height.

The pylons are coated at the base with blocks of white limestone and are lightened by niches with arched tops. The holes in the lateral structure now allow the possibility of the presence of columns which framed the niches and must have supported an entablature which would have been above the vaults. It is believed the niches once held statues.

On the inside of the pylons of the central passage are some niches, but these are modern recreations.

== See also ==
- List of Roman triumphal arches
- Arch of Hadrian (Athens)

== Sources ==
- Lorenzo Quilici, Stefania Quilici Gigli, "Sull'arco di Capua", in Lorenzo Quilici & Stefania Quilici Gigli (ed.s), Urbanizzazione delle campagne nell'Italia antica, Roma 2001, p. 205-231.
