= Deditio =

In ancient Rome, deditio was the surrender of an enemy community, resulting in the annexation of its territory. The people of the community became peregrini dediticii, free noncitizens under Roman rule.

The Augustan-era historian Livy narrates an early example of deditio from Rome's semilegendary Regal period, when Tarquinius Priscus defeated the Collatini. When asked "Do you surrender yourselves and the people of Collatia, city (urbs), lands (agri), water (aqua), boundary marks (termini), shrines (delubra), utensils (utensilia), and all appurtenances divine and human (divina humanque omnnia), into my power (dicio) and that of the Roman people?" the Collatini replied in the affirmative. Although Rome claimed rights to the lands and property of the defeated, restitution might be made to some individuals or to the conquered people as a whole. Those who had surrendered (dediticii) under these terms were not to be enslaved, as war captives were by custom.

== Medieval Europe ==
In medieval Europe, deditio was a ritual of submission. It was a ceremony of subjection between a monarch and their subject, and included the latter bowing or lying by the feet of the monarch, barefoot and wearing robes. This display of submission was planned, agreed upon, and used as a strategy for peaceful conflict resolution to avoid escalation of conflict.

The deditio took place in public. The individual performing the deditio was required to demonstrate his self-humiliation by removing his shoes, donning a penitential robe, or copiously weeping. He was then to throw himself at the feet of the king, begging the king do with him as he would. The king would then raise the supplicant from the ground and show forgiveness with a kiss or a hug. Following a brief symbolic term of imprisonment, the supplicant would then have his previous obligations and offices restored to him in a display of magnanimity by the king.

Nothing about this ceremony was spontaneous. The terms under dispute had been fully discussed, explained, clarified, and agreed upon in confidence by the mediators. The deditio was the carefully staged outcome of these negotiations. The mediators were in most cases the most influential men in the kingdom and were not bound by the king's instructions. Their involvement therefore served as an important constraint on the arbitrary exercise of royal power during the early and high Middle Ages. Their purpose was to show the conflicting parties a way forward by proposing solutions that could be acceptable to both sides. When the king violated an agreement previously entered into, it was not unusual for the mediators to intervene on behalf of the wronged party.
