= Civitas sine suffragio =

Level of citizenship in the Roman Republic

Civitas sine suffragio (Latin, "citizenship without the vote") was a level of citizenship in the Roman Republic which granted all the rights of Roman citizenship except the right to vote in popular assemblies. This status was first extended to some of the city-states which had been incorporated into the Republic following the break-up of the Latin League in 338 BCE. It became the standard Romanization policy for incorporating conquered regions in building the Roman Empire.

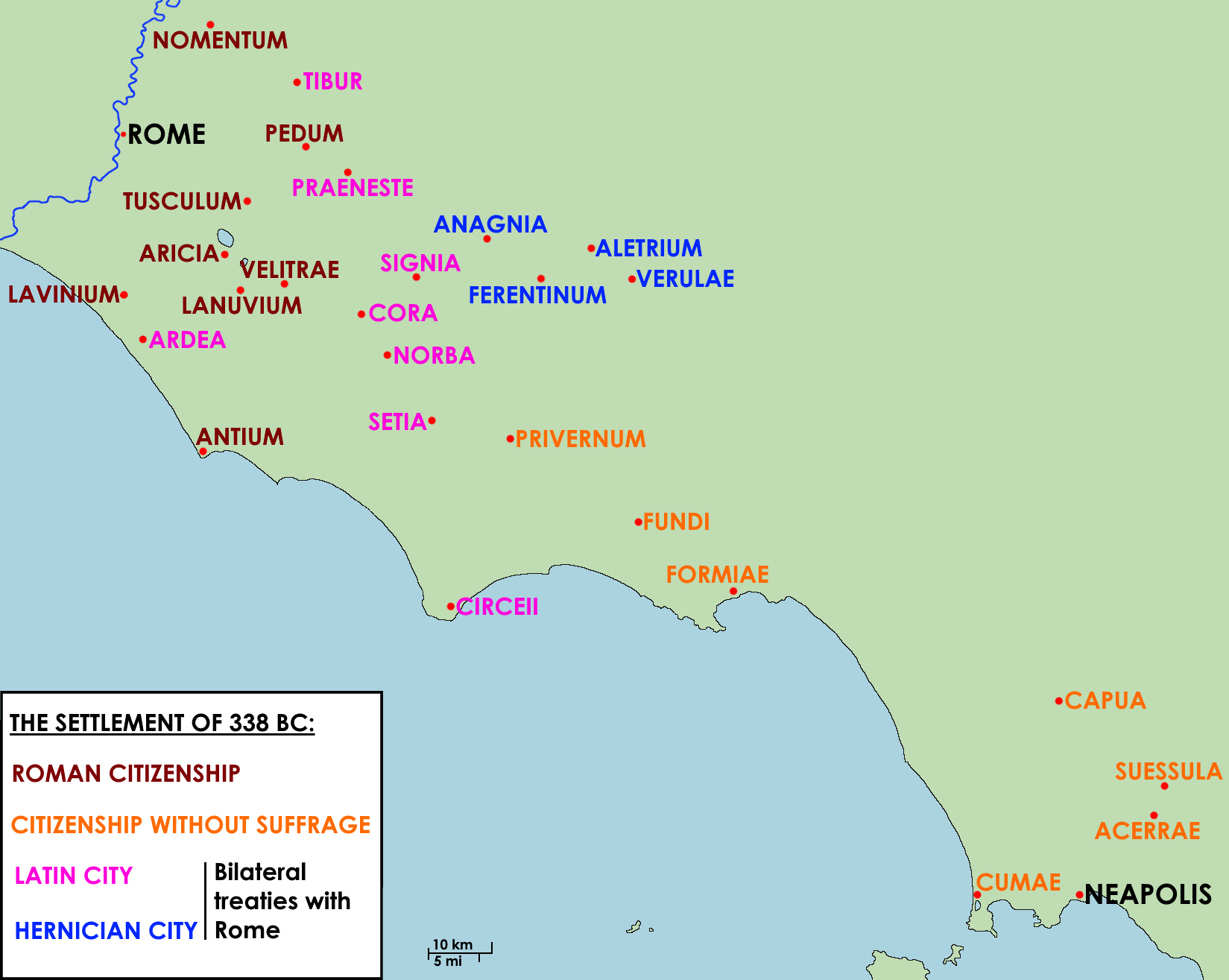
Map of the Settlement made by Rome with Latin and Italian communities after the Latin War (341–338 BCE); the cities that were given half-citizenship are in orange.

== See also ==
- Metic
- Denization
- Permanent resident

== Sources ==
- Sherwin-White, A.N. (1973), The Roman Citizenship (2nd ed.), Oxford and New York: Oxford U.P.
- Velasco, J.C. (2010): "Civitas sine suffragio"
