= Slavery in ancient Rome =

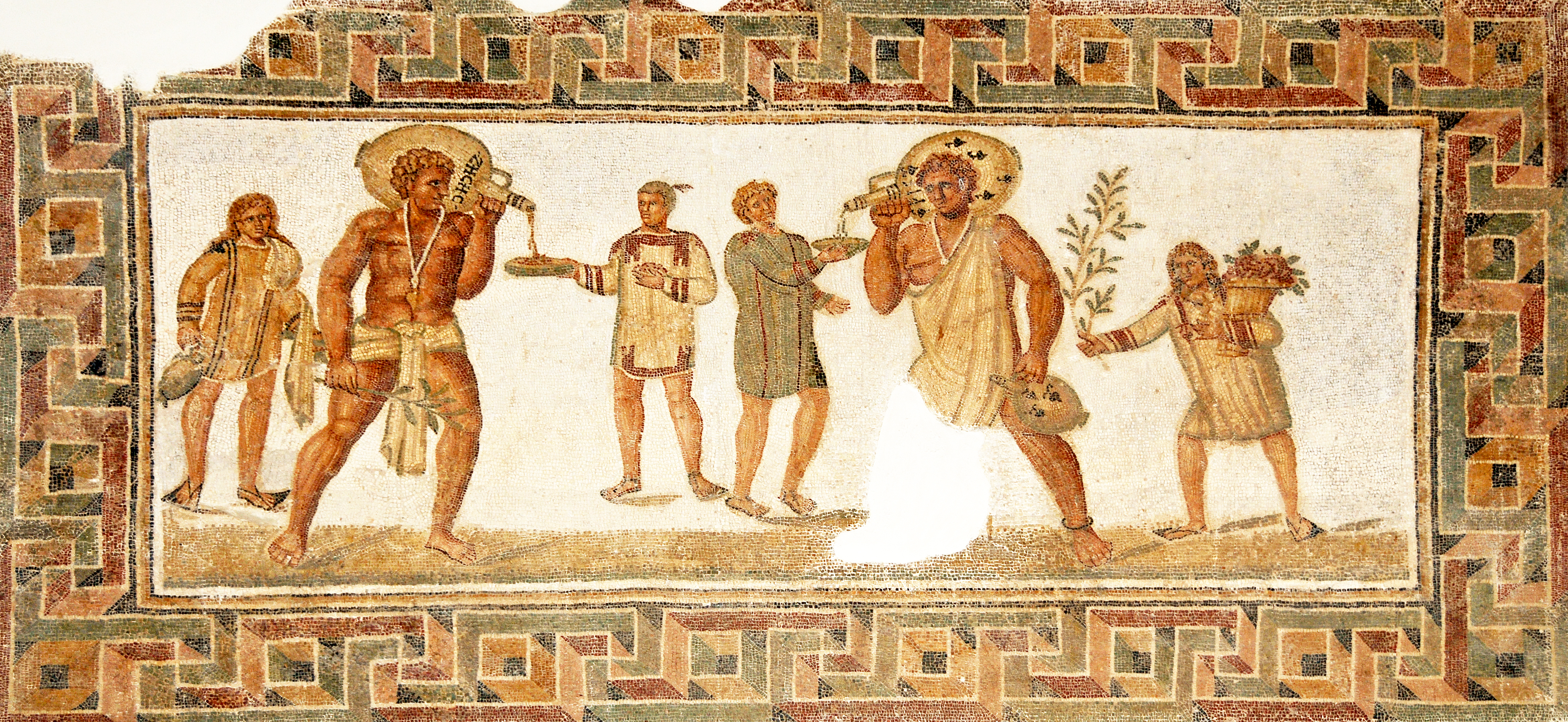
Roman mosaic from Dougga, Tunisia (2nd/3rd century AD): Two large slaves carrying wine jars; each wears an amulet against an evil eye on a necklace, with one in a loincloth (left) and the other in an exomis; (Note: Aliza Steinberg notes the decorated tunics (Latin: tunicae manicatae) of the two free men being served.) the young slave to the left carries water and towels, and the one on the right a bough and a basket of flowers.

Slavery played an important role in the society and economy of ancient Rome. Unskilled or low-skill slaves labored in the fields, mines, and mills with few opportunities for advancement and little chance of freedom. Skilled and educated slaves—including artisans, chefs, domestic staff and personal attendants, entertainers, business managers, accountants and bankers, educators at all levels, secretaries and librarians, civil servants, and physicians—occupied a more privileged tier of servitude and could hope to obtain freedom through one of several well-defined paths with protections under the law. The possibility of manumission and subsequent citizenship was a distinguishing feature of Rome's system of slavery, resulting in a significant and influential number of freedpersons in Roman society.

At all levels of employment, free working people, former slaves, and the enslaved mostly did the same kinds of jobs. Elite Romans whose wealth came from property ownership saw little difference between slavery and a dependence on earning wages from labor. Slaves were themselves considered property under Roman law and had no rights of legal personhood. Unlike Roman citizens, by law they could be subjected to corporal punishment, sexual exploitation, torture, and summary execution. The most brutal forms of punishment were reserved for slaves. The adequacy of their diet, shelter, clothing, and healthcare was dependent on their perceived utility to owners whose impulses might be cruel or situationally humane.

Some people were born into slavery as the child of an enslaved mother. Others became slaves. War captives were considered legally enslaved, and Roman military expansion during the Republican era was a major source of slaves. From the 2nd century BC through late antiquity, kidnapping and piracy put freeborn people all around the Mediterranean at risk of illegal enslavement, to which the children of poor families were especially vulnerable. Although a law was passed to ban debt slavery quite early in Rome's history, some people sold themselves into contractual slavery to escape poverty. The slave trade, lightly taxed and regulated, flourished in all reaches of the Roman Empire and across borders.

In antiquity, slavery was seen as the political consequence of one group dominating another, and people of any race, ethnicity, or place of origin might become slaves, including freeborn Romans. Slavery was practiced within all communities of the Roman Empire, including among Jews and Christians. Even modest households might expect to have two or three slaves.

A period of slave rebellions ended with the defeat of Spartacus in 71 BC; slave uprisings grew rare in the Imperial era, when individual escape was a more persistent form of resistance. Fugitive slave-hunting was the most concerted form of policing in the Roman Empire.

Moral discourse on slavery was concerned with the treatment of slaves, and abolitionist views were almost nonexistent. Inscriptions set up by slaves and freedpersons and the art and decoration of their houses offer glimpses of how they saw themselves. A few writers and philosophers of the Roman era were former slaves or the sons of freed slaves. Some scholars have made efforts to imagine more deeply the lived experiences of slaves in the Roman world through comparisons to the Atlantic slave trade, but no portrait of the "typical" Roman slave emerges from the wide range of work performed by slaves and freedmen and the complex distinctions among their social and legal statuses.

== Origins ==
Periodization of Roman History

- Terminology and dates as used in this article (Note: This timeline is a framework for understanding periods of Roman history as they are referred to in this article. It is not meant as definitional.)
- Regal 753–509 BC (semilegendary)
- Republican 509–27 BC
  Early Republic 509–280s/260s BC
  Middle Republic 280s–146 BC
  Classical, 2nd century BC–2nd century AD (Note: A core period of Roman history producing the most abundant extant literary sources.)
  Late Republic 146–44 BC
  Imperial 27 BC–AD 313 (Note: This article treats the Christianization of the Roman Empire as a turning point that affects legislative, moral, social, and cultural concerns.)
  Principate 27 BC–AD 284
  Augustan era 27 BC–AD 14
  Pax Romana 1st–2nd century AD
  Crisis of the Third Century
  Christianization beginning AD 313 (Note: The Edict of Milan is here taken as the beginning of the Christianization of the Roman state and the eventual suppression of religious pluralism in the Roman Empire.)
  Reign of Constantine I AD 306–337
  Late antiquity AD 313–mid 7th century
- Early Byzantine Empire 330–636 (Note: Isidore of Seville is the latest primary source regarded as "ancient" by the scholarship on which this article is based.)
  Reign of Theodosius 379–395
  Reign of Justinian 527–565

From Rome's earliest historical period, domestic slaves were part of a familia, the body of a household's dependents—a word especially, or sometimes limited to, referring to the slaves collectively. Pliny (1st century AD) was nostalgic for a time when "the ancients" lived more intimately in a household with no need for "legions of slaves"—but still imagined this simpler domestic life as supported by the possession of a slave.

All those belonging to the familia were subject to the paterfamilias, the "father" or head of household and more precisely the estate owner. According to Seneca, the early Romans coined paterfamilias as a euphemism for the relationship of a master to his slaves. The word for "master" was dominus as the one who controlled the domain of the domus (household); dominium was the word for his control over the slaves. The paterfamilias held the power of life and death (vitae necisque potestas) over the dependents of his household, including his sons and daughters as well as slaves. The Greek historian Dionysius of Halicarnassus (1st century AD) asserts that this right dated back to the legendary time of Romulus.

In contrast to Greek city-states, Rome was an ethnically diverse population and incorporated former slaves as citizens. Dionysius found it remarkable that when Romans manumitted their slaves, they gave them Roman citizenship as well. Myths of Rome's founding sought to account for both this heterogeneity and the role of freedmen in Roman society. The legendary founding by Romulus began with his establishment of a place of refuge that, according to the Augustan-era historian Livy, attracted "mostly former slaves, vagabonds, and runaways all looking for a fresh start" as citizens of the new city, which Livy considers a source of Rome's strength. Servius Tullius, the semi-legendary sixth king of Rome, was said to have been the son of a slave woman, and the cultural role of slavery is embedded in some religious festivals and temples that the Romans associated with his reign.

Some legal and religious developments pertaining to slavery thus can be discerned even in Rome's earliest institutions. The Twelve Tables, the earliest Roman legal code, dated traditionally to 451/450 BC, do not contain law defining slavery, the existence of which is taken as a given. But there are mentions of manumission and the status of freedmen, who are referred to as cives Romani liberti, "freedmen who are Roman citizens", indicating that as early as the 5th century BC, former slaves were a significant demographic that the law needed to address, with a legal path to freedom and the opportunity to participate in the legal and political system.

The Roman jurist Gaius described slavery as "the state that is recognized by the ius gentium in which someone is subject to the dominion of another person contrary to nature" (Institutiones 1.3.2, 161 AD). Ulpian (2nd century AD) also regarded slavery as an aspect of the ius gentium, the customary international law held in common among all peoples (gentes). In Ulpian's tripartite division of law, the "law of nations" was considered neither natural law, thought to exist in nature and govern animals as well as humans, nor civil law, the legal code particular to a people or nation. All human beings are born free (liberi) under natural law, but since slavery was held to be a universal practice, individual nations would develop their own civil laws pertaining to slaves. In ancient warfare, the victor had the right under the ius gentium to enslave a defeated population; however, if a settlement had been reached through diplomatic negotiations or formal surrender, the people were by custom to be spared violence and enslavement. The ius gentium was not a legal code, and any force it had depended on "reasoned compliance with standards of international conduct".

Although Rome's earliest wars were defensive, a Roman victory would still result in the enslavement of the defeated under these circumstances, as is recorded at the conclusion of the war with the Etruscan city of Veii in 396 BC. Defensive wars also drained manpower for agriculture, increasing the demand for labor—a demand that could be met by the availability of war captives. From the sixth through the third centuries BC, Rome gradually became a "slave society", with the first two Punic Wars (265–201 BC) producing the most dramatic surge in the number of slaves.

Slavery with the possibility of manumission became so embedded in Roman society that by the 2nd century AD, most free citizens in the city of Rome are likely to have had slaves "somewhere in their ancestry".

=== Enslavement of Roman citizens ===
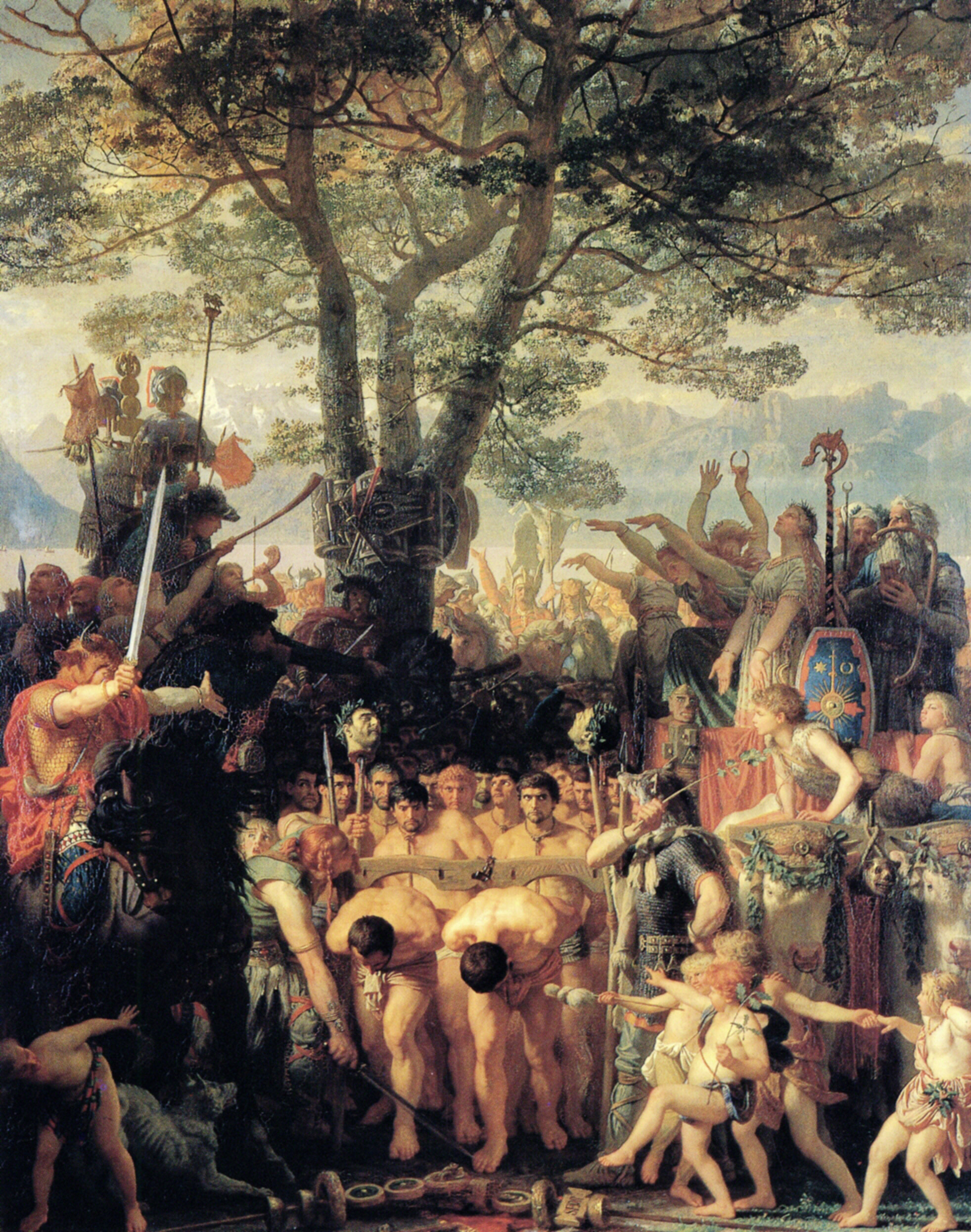
Romans Passing under the Yoke (1858) by Charles Gleyre, imagining the subjugation of Romans following their defeat by the Helvetii around 107 BC (Cantonal Museum of Fine Arts)

In early Rome, the Twelve Tables permitted debt slavery under harsh terms and made freeborn Romans subject to enslavement as a result of financial misfortune. A law in the late 4th century BC put a stop to creditors enslaving a defaulting debtor as a private action, though a debtor could still be compelled by a legal judgment to work off his debt. Otherwise, the only means of enslaving a freeborn citizen that the Romans of the Republican era recognized as lawful was military defeat and capture under the ius gentium.

The Carthaginian leader Hannibal enslaved Roman war captives in large numbers during the Second Punic War. Following the Roman defeat at the Battle of Lake Trasimene (217 BC), the treaty included terms for ransoming prisoners of war. The Roman senate declined to do so, and their commander ended up paying the ransom himself. After the disastrous Battle of Cannae the following year, Hannibal again stipulated a redemption of captives, but the senate after debate again voted not to pay, preferring to send a message that soldiers should fight to victory or die. Hannibal then sold these prisoners of war to the Greeks, and they remained slaves until the Second Macedonian War, when Flamininus recovered 1,200 men who had survived some twenty years of slavery after Cannae. The war that most dramatically escalated the number of slaves brought into Roman society at the same time had exposed an unprecedented number of Roman citizens to enslavement.

In the later Republic and during the Imperial period, thousands of soldiers, citizens, and their slaves in the Roman East were taken captive and enslaved by the Parthians or later within the Sasanian Empire. The Parthians captured 10,000 survivors after the defeat of Marcus Crassus at the Battle of Carrhae in 53 BC, and marched them 1,500 miles to Margiana in Bactria, where their fate is unknown. (Note: In 36 BC, during a failed attempt to recover the standards lost, Mark Antony is supposed to have been guided by a survivor of Carrhae who had served under Parthians: Velleius Paterculus 2.82; Florus 2.20.4; Plutarch, Antony 41.1. in the 1940s, American sinologist Homer H. Dubs stirred up both scholarly imagination and scholarly indignation in a series of articles and finally a book arguing that enslaved Roman survivors of Carrhae were traded, or escaped and settled, as far as China.) While thoughts of returning the Roman military standards lost at Carrhae motivated military minds for decades, "considerably less official concern was expressed about the liberation of Roman prisoners". Writing about thirty years after the battle, the Augustan poet Horace imagined them married to "barbarian" women and serving the Parthian army, too dishonored to be restored to Rome. (Note: Some captives from Carrhae and from two later attempts to avenge the defeat may have been restored in 20 BC when Augustus negotiated the return of the standards.)

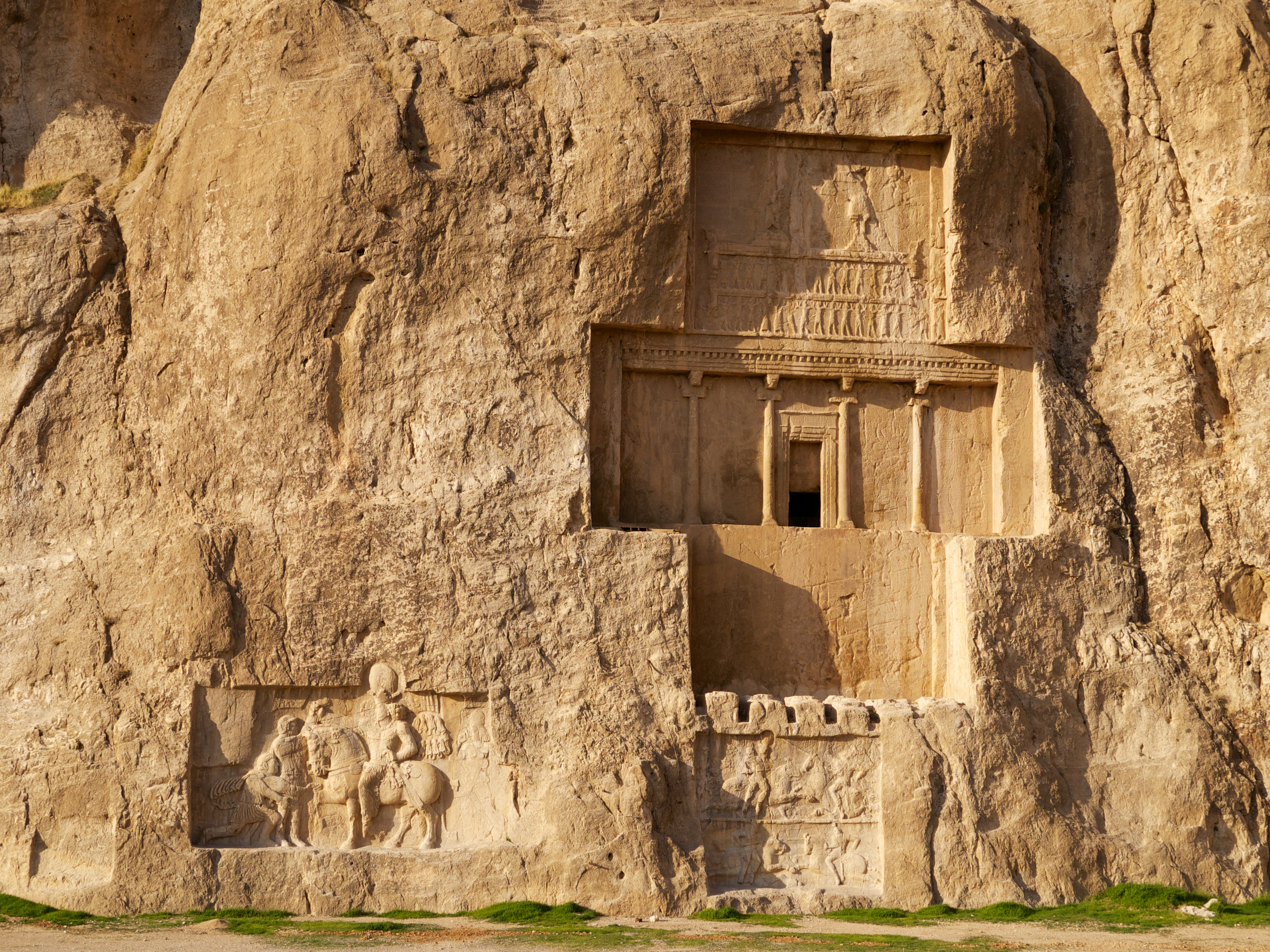
Shapur I employed enslaved Roman engineers, craftsmen, and labor for his monumental building program at such sites as Naqsh-e Rostam, present-day Iran.

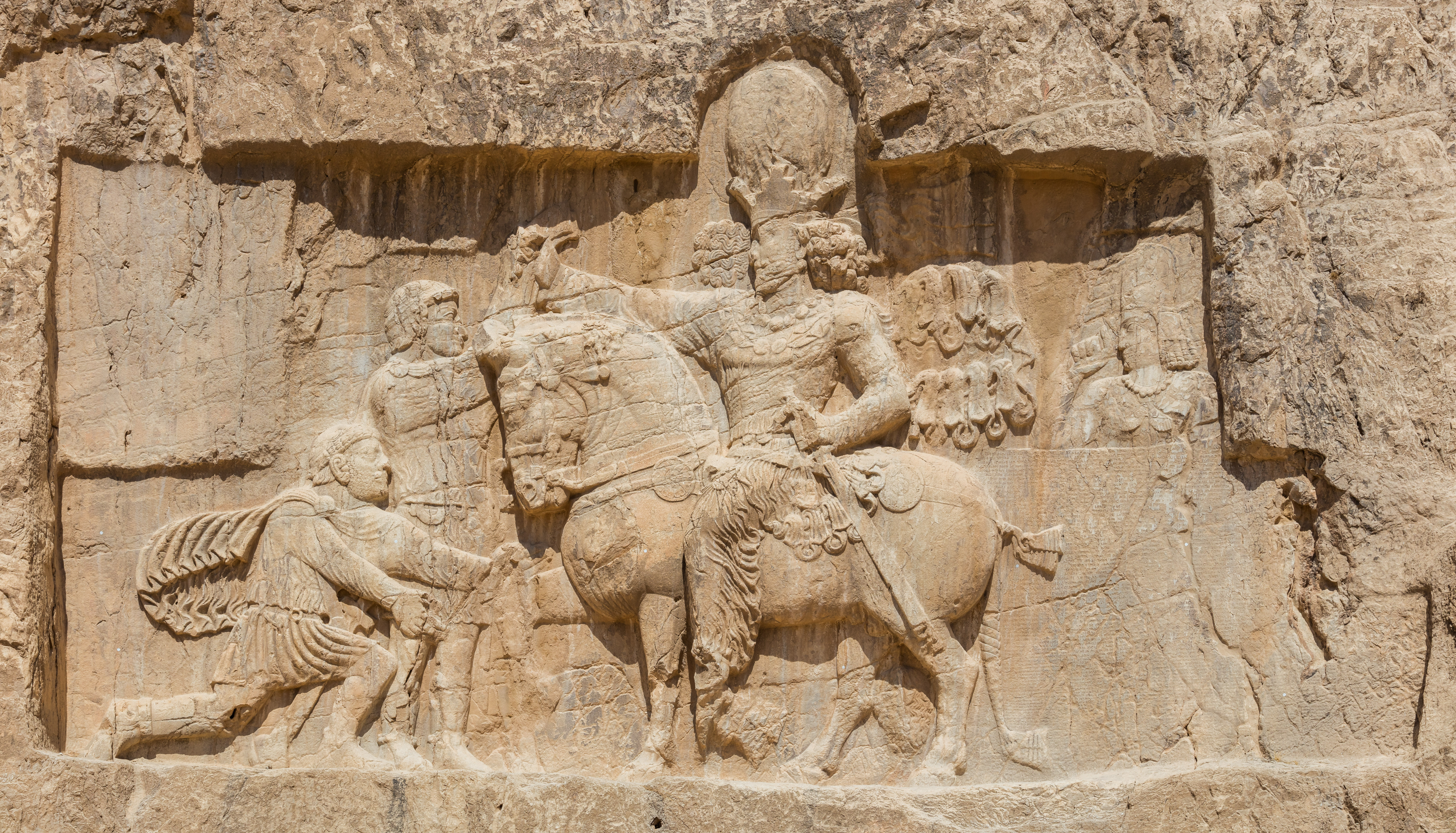
Detail of relief (lower left above) depicting the Roman emperor Valerian (sometimes identified as Philip the Arab) submitting to Shapur I

Valerian became the first emperor to be held captive after his defeat by Shapur I at the Battle of Edessa in AD 260. According to hostile Christian sources, the aging emperor was treated as a slave and subjected to a grotesque array of humiliations. Reliefs and inscriptions located at the sacred Zoroastrian site of Naqsh-e Rostam, southwest Iran, celebrate the victories of Shapur I and his successor over the Romans, with emperors in subjection and legionaries paying tribute. Shapur's inscriptions record that the Roman troops he had enslaved came from all reaches of the empire.

A Roman enslaved in war under such circumstances lost his citizen rights at home. His right to own property was forfeited, his marriage was dissolved, and if he was head of a household his legal power (potestas) over his dependents was suspended. If he was released from slavery, his citizen status might be restored along with his property and potestas. His marriage, however, was not automatically renewed; another agreement of consent by both parties had to be arranged. The loss of citizenship was a consequence of submitting to an enemy sovereign state; freeborn people kidnapped by bandits or pirates were regarded as seized illegally, and therefore they could be ransomed, or their sale into slavery rendered void, without compromising their citizen status. This contrast between the consequences for status from war (bellum) and from banditry (latrocinium) may be reflected in the similar Jewish distinction between a "captive of a kingdom" and a "captive of banditry", in what would be a rare example of Roman law influencing the language and formulation of rabbinic law.

The legal process originally developed for reintegrating war captives was postliminium, a return after passing out of Roman jurisdiction and then crossing back over one's own "threshold" (limen). Not all war captives were eligible for reintegration; the terms of a treaty might permit the other side to retain captives as servi hostium, "slaves of the enemy". A ransom could be paid to redeem a captive individually or as a group; an individual ransomed by someone outside his family was required to pay back the money before his full rights could be restored, and although he was a freeborn person, his status was ambiguous until the lien was lifted.

An investigative procedure was put in place under the emperor Hadrian to determine whether returned soldiers had been captured or surrendered willingly. Traitors, deserters, and those who had a chance to escape but made no attempt were not eligible for postliminium restoration of their citizenship.

Because postliminium law also applied to enemy seizure of mobile property, it was the means by which military-support slaves taken by the enemy were brought back into possession and restored to their former slave status under their Roman owners.

== The slave in Roman law and society ==
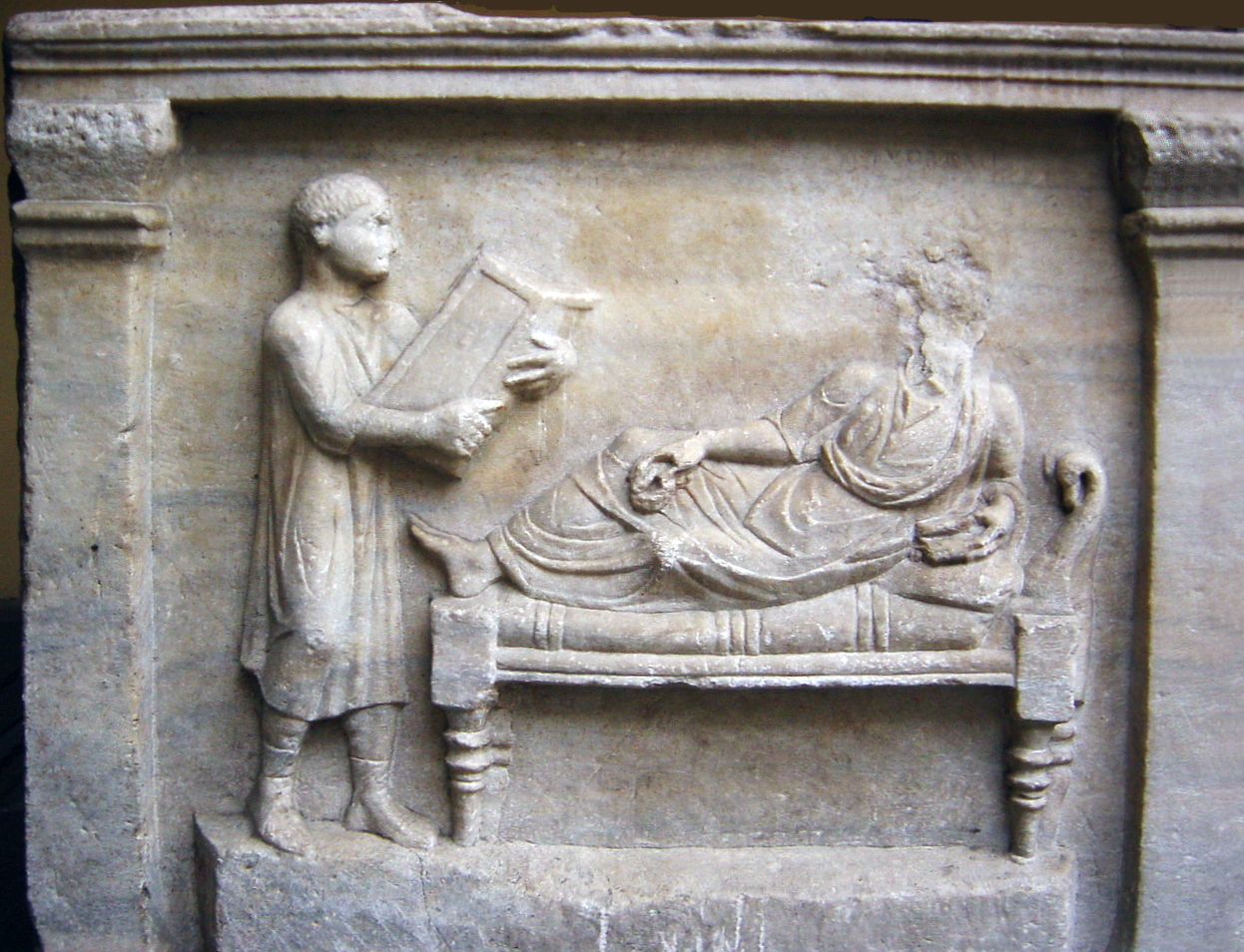
Sarcophagus relief of Valerius Petronianus, with his slave holding writing tablets (4th century AD)

Fundamentally, the slave in ancient Roman law was one who lacked libertas, liberty defined as "the absence of servitude". (Note: W. W. Buckland, whose early 20th-century book on Roman law pertaining to slavery remains an essential reference, gave up on "the hopeless task of defining liberty" (The Roman Law of Slavery, p. 437).) Cicero (1st century BC) asserted that liberty "does not consist in having a just master (dominus), but in having none". The common Latin word for "slave" was servus, (Note: Other words used to refer to the slave include homo (human being of any gender), famulus (referring to the slave's role within the familia), ancilla (a female slave; serva was less common), and puer (boy).) but in Roman law, a slave as chattel was mancipium, a grammatically neuter word meaning something "taken in hand", manus, a metaphor for possession and hence control and subordination. Agricultural slaves, certain farmland within the Italian peninsula, and farm animals were all res mancipi, a category of property established in early Rome's rural economy as requiring a formal legal process (mancipatio) for transferring ownership. The exclusive right to trade in res mancipi was a defining aspect of Roman citizenship in the Republican era; free noncitizen residents (peregrini) could not buy and sell this form of property without a special grant of commercial rights. (Note: In her essay "The Concept of Commercium in the Roman Republic," Saskia T. Roselaar notes that "farmland" may have been defined more narrowly as land designated as ager Romanus.)

The Roman citizen who enjoyed liberty to the fullest extent was thus the property owner, the paterfamilias who had a legal right to control the estate. The paterfamilias exercised his power within the domus, the "house" of his extended family, as master (dominus); patriarchy was recognized in Roman law as a form of household-level governance. (Note: Saller (1994): "Rome has provided the paradigm of patriarchy in western thought", based on "the paterfamilias with his unlimited legal powers over members of his familia. ... The Roman family was unquestionably patriarchal, in the sense that it was defined with reference to the father, who was endowed with a special authority in the household ... a striking potestas encompassing extensive coercive and proprietary rights." Saller asserts throughout that this is a reductively legalistic view that in no way encompasses the full range of emotional and moral relations within the family.) The head of household was entitled to manage his dependents and to administer ad hoc justice to them with minimal oversight from the state. In early Rome, the paterfamilias had the right to sell, punish, or kill both his children (liberi, the "free ones" in the household) and the slaves of the familia. This power of life and death, expressed as vitae necisque potestas, was exercised over all members of the extended household except his wife (Note: The phrase vitae necisque potestas is not used to express a husband's power over his wife, though summary execution of a wife was considered justifiable under some circumstances, such as adultery or drunkenness, that varied by historical period. In early Rome, marriage contracted in manu put wives in a subordinate position; from the time of Augustus, a married woman remained under her own father's power, granting a female Roman citizen an unusual degree of independence from her husband relative to many other ancient societies. In the event of divorce, wealth the wife brought into the marriage remained attached to her, along with profits generated.)— a free Roman woman could own property of her own as a domina, and a married woman's slaves could act as her agents independently of her husband. Despite structural symmetries, the distinction between the father's governance of his children and of his slaves is put bluntly by Cicero: the master can expect his children to obey him readily but will need to "coerce and break his slave".

Although slaves were recognized as human beings (homines, singular homo), they lacked legal personhood (Latin persona). Lacking legal standing as a person, a slave could not enter into legal contracts on his own behalf; in effect, he remained a perpetual minor. A slave could not be sued or be the plaintiff in a lawsuit. The testimony of a slave could not be accepted in a court of law unless the slave was tortured—a practice based on the belief that slaves in a position to be privy to their masters' affairs should be too virtuously loyal to reveal damaging evidence unless coerced, even though the Romans were aware that testimony produced under torture was unreliable. A slave was not permitted to testify against his master unless the charge was treason (crimen maiestatis). When a slave committed a crime, the punishment exacted was likely to be far more severe than for the same crime committed by a free person. Persona gradually became "synonymous with the true nature of the individual" in the Roman world, in the view of Marcel Mauss, but "servus non habet personam ('a slave has no persona'). He has no personality. He does not own his body; he has no ancestors, no name, no cognomen, no goods of his own."

Owing to a growing body of laws, in the imperial period a master could face penalties for killing a slave without just cause and could be compelled to sell a slave on grounds of mistreatment. Claudius decreed that if a slave was abandoned by his master, he became free. Nero granted slaves the right to complain against their masters in a court. And under Antoninus Pius, a master who killed a slave without just cause could be tried for homicide. From the mid to late 2nd century AD, slaves had more standing to complain of cruel or unfair treatment by their owners. But since even in late antiquity slaves still could not file lawsuits, could not testify without first undergoing torture, and could be punished by being burnt alive for testifying against their masters, it is unclear how these offenses could be brought to court and prosecuted; evidence is scant that they were.

As the Roman Empire was becoming Christianized, Constantine II (emperor AD 337–340) barred Jews from owning Christian slaves, converting their slaves to Judaism, or circumcising their slaves. Laws in late antiquity discouraging the subjection of Christians to Jewish owners suggest that they were aimed at protecting Christian identity, since Christian households continued to have slaves who were Christian.

=== Marriage and family ===
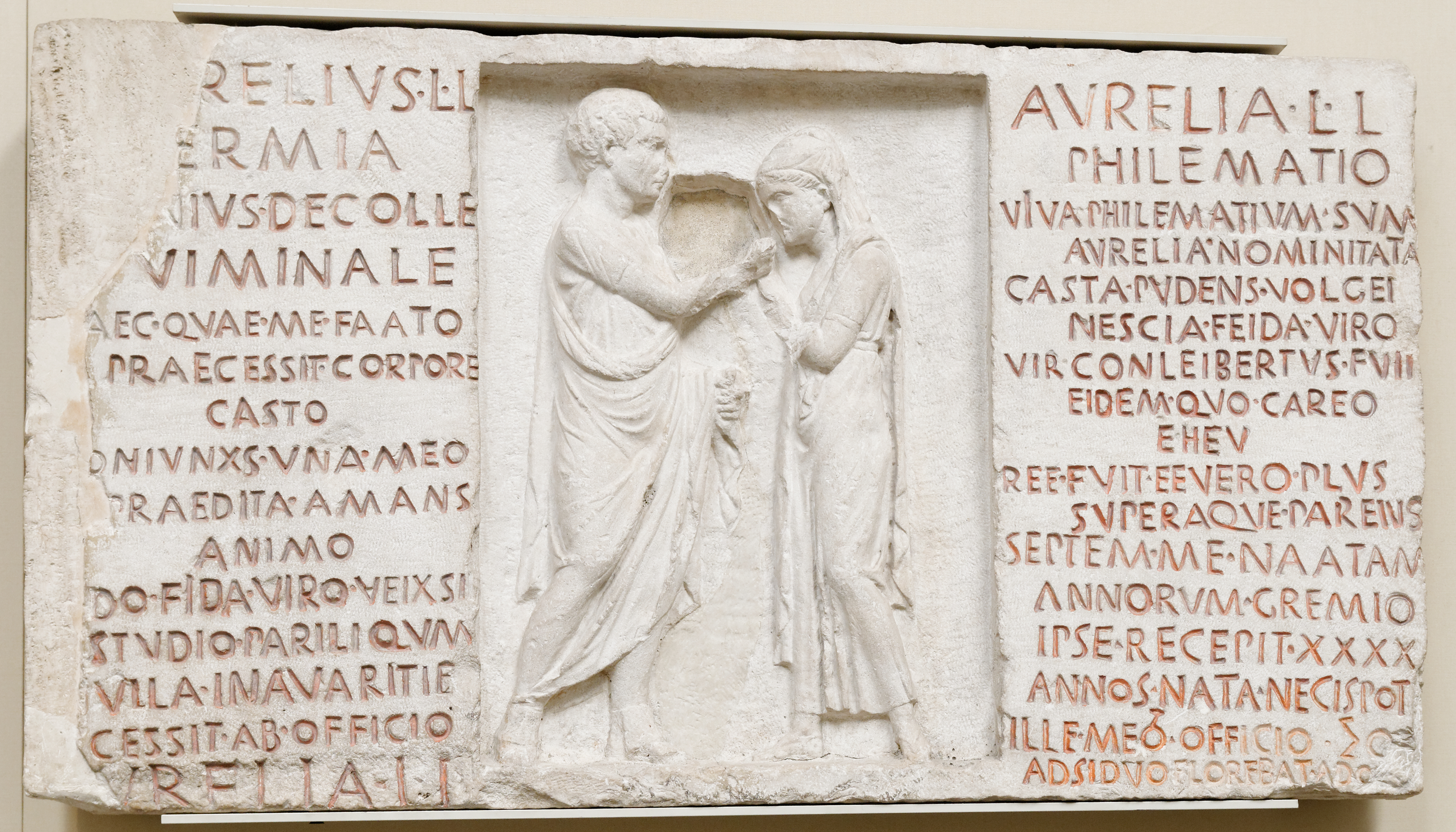
Funerary relief (ca. 80 BC) celebrating the marriage between Aurelius Hermia and Aurelia Philematium as conliberti, fellow slaves in the same household who were freed (British Museum)

In Roman law, the slave had no kinship—no ancestral or paternal lineage, and no collateral relatives. The lack of legal personhood meant that slaves could not enter into forms of marriage recognized under Roman law, and a male slave was not a father as a matter of law because he could not exercise patriarchal potestas. However, slaves born into the familia and "upwardly mobile" slaves who held privileged positions might form a heterosexual union with a partner that was intended to be lasting or permanent, within which children might be reared. Such a union, either arranged or approved and recognized by the slave's owner, was called contubernium. Though not technically a marriage, it had legal implications that were addressed by Roman jurists in case law and expressed an intention to marry if both partners gained manumission. (Note: A few scholars, who assert otherwise, overlook juristic discussions of family law in which contubernium is cited as extralegal or ad hoc marriage even though not matrimony by law.) A contubernium was normally a cohabitation between two slaves within the same household, and contubernia were recorded along with births, deaths, and manumissions in large households concerned with lineage. Sometimes only one partner (contubernalis) obtained free status before the death of the other, as commemorated in epitaphs. These quasi marital unions were especially common among imperial slaves.

The master had the legal right to break up or sell off family members, and it has sometimes been assumed that they did so arbitrarily. But because of the value Romans placed on home-reared slaves (vernae) in expanding their familia, there is more evidence that the formation of family units, though not recognized as such for purposes of law and inheritance, was supported within larger urban households and on rural estates. Roman jurists who weigh in on actions that might break up slave families generally favored keeping them together, and protections for them appear several times in the compendium of Roman law known as the Digest. A master who left his rural estate to an heir often included the workforce of slaves, sometimes with express provisions that slave families—father and mother, children, and grandchildren—be kept together.

Among the laws Augustus issued pertaining to marriage and sexual morality was one permitting legal marriage between a freedwoman and a freeborn man of any rank below the senatorial, and legitimizing their heirs. A master could free a slave for the purpose of marrying her, becoming both her patron and her husband. Roman women, including freedwomen, could own property and initiate divorce, which required the intention of only one of the partners. But when marriage had been a condition of the freedwoman's manumission agreement, she lacked these rights. If she wanted to divorce her patron and marry someone else, she had to obtain his consent; provide evidence that he was not mentally competent to form intent; or show that he had broken their commitment by planning to marry someone else or taking a concubine.

=== Peculium ===
Because they were themselves property (res), as a matter of law Roman slaves could not own property. However, they could be allowed to hold and manage property, which they could use as if it were their own, even though it ultimately belonged to their master. A fund or property set aside for a slave's use was called a peculium. Isidore of Seville, looking back from the early 7th century, offered this definition: "peculium is in the proper sense something which belongs to minors or slaves. For peculium is what a father or master allows his child or slave to manage as his own."

The practice of allowing the slave a peculium likely originated on agricultural estates in setting aside small parcels of land where slave families could grow some of their own food. The word peculium points to the addition of livestock (pecus). Any surplus could be sold at market. Like other practices that encouraged agency among slaves in furthering their skills, this early form of peculium served an ethic of self-sufficiency and might motivate slaves to be more productive in ways that ultimately benefitted the slave owner, leading over time to more sophisticated opportunities for business development and wealth management for enslaved people.

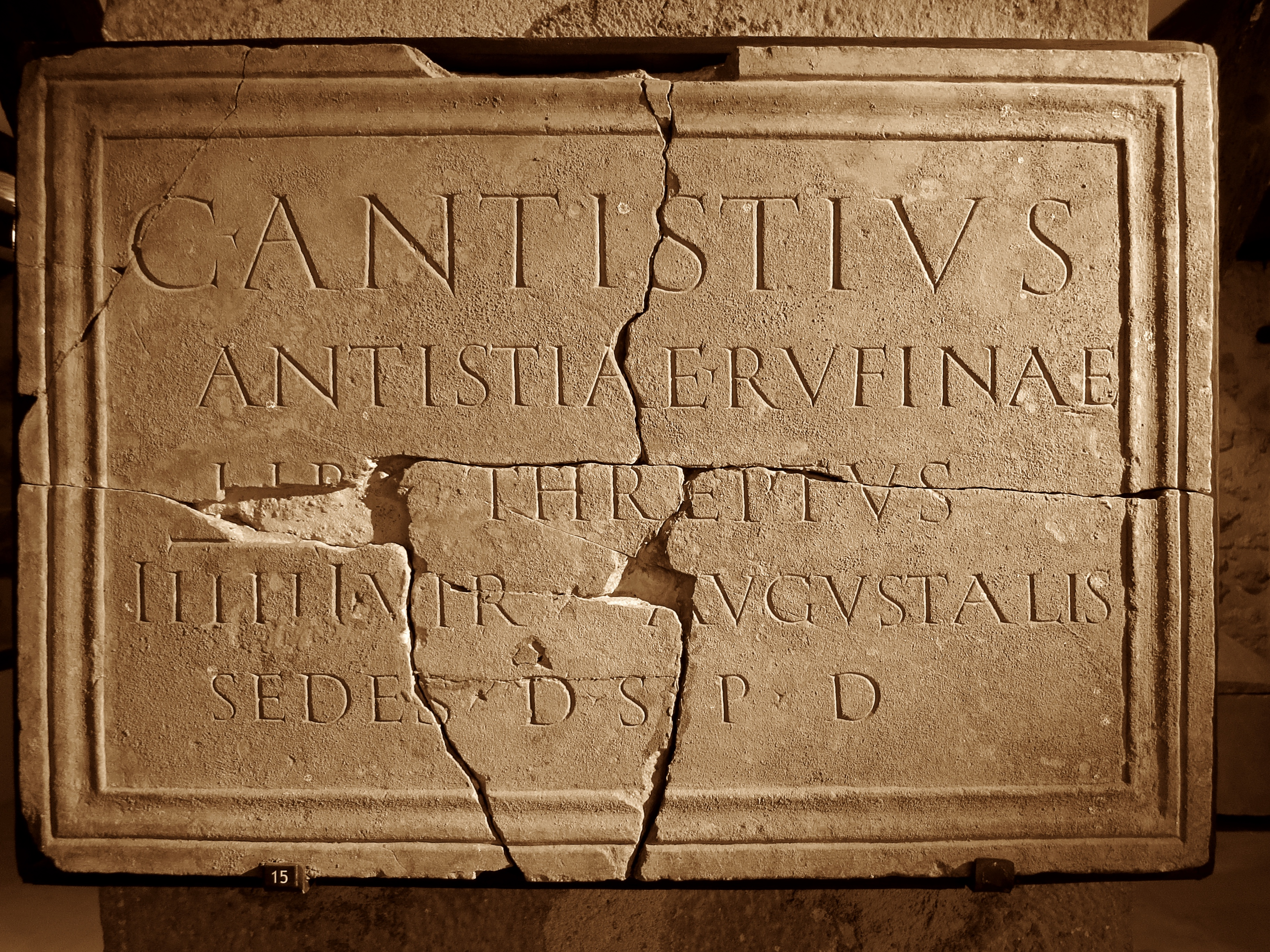
An inscription declaring that the freedman Gaius Antistius Threptus paid for the dedication "with his own money" (Musée des Jacobins, Auch)

Slaves within a wealthy household or country estate might be given a small monetary peculium as an allowance. The master's obligation to provide for the slave's subsistence was not counted as part of this discretionary peculium. Growth of the peculium came from the slave's own savings, including profits set aside from what was owed to the master as a result of sales or business transactions conducted by the slave, and anything given to a slave by a third party for "meritorious services". The slave's own earnings could also be the original source of the monetary peculium rather than a grant by the master, and in inscriptions slaves and freedpersons at times assert that they had paid for the dedication "with their own money". The peculium in the form of property could include other slaves put at the disposal of the peculium-holder; in this sense, inscriptions not infrequently record that a slave "belonged to" another slave. Property otherwise could not be owned by the dependents of a household, defined as someone subordinate to the potestas of the paterfamilias—including not only slaves, but adult sons who remained minors by law until their father's death. All wealth belonged to the head of household except for that owned independently by his wife, whose slaves might operate with their own peculia from her.

The legal dodge of peculium enabled both adult sons and capable slaves to manage property, turn a profit, and negotiate contracts. Legal texts do not recognize a fundamental distinction between slaves and sons acting as business agent (institor). However, legal restrictions on making loans to unemancipated sons, introduced in the mid 1st century AD, made them less useful than slaves in this role.

Slaves with the skills and opportunities to earn money might hope to save enough to buy their freedom. There was a risk to the still-enslaved person that the master would renege and take back the earnings, but one of the expanded protections for slaves in the Imperial era was that a manumission agreement between the slave and his master could be enforced. While very few slaves ever controlled large sums of money, slaves who managed a peculium had a far better chance of obtaining liberty. With this business acumen, certain freedmen went on to amass considerable fortunes.

=== Manumission ===
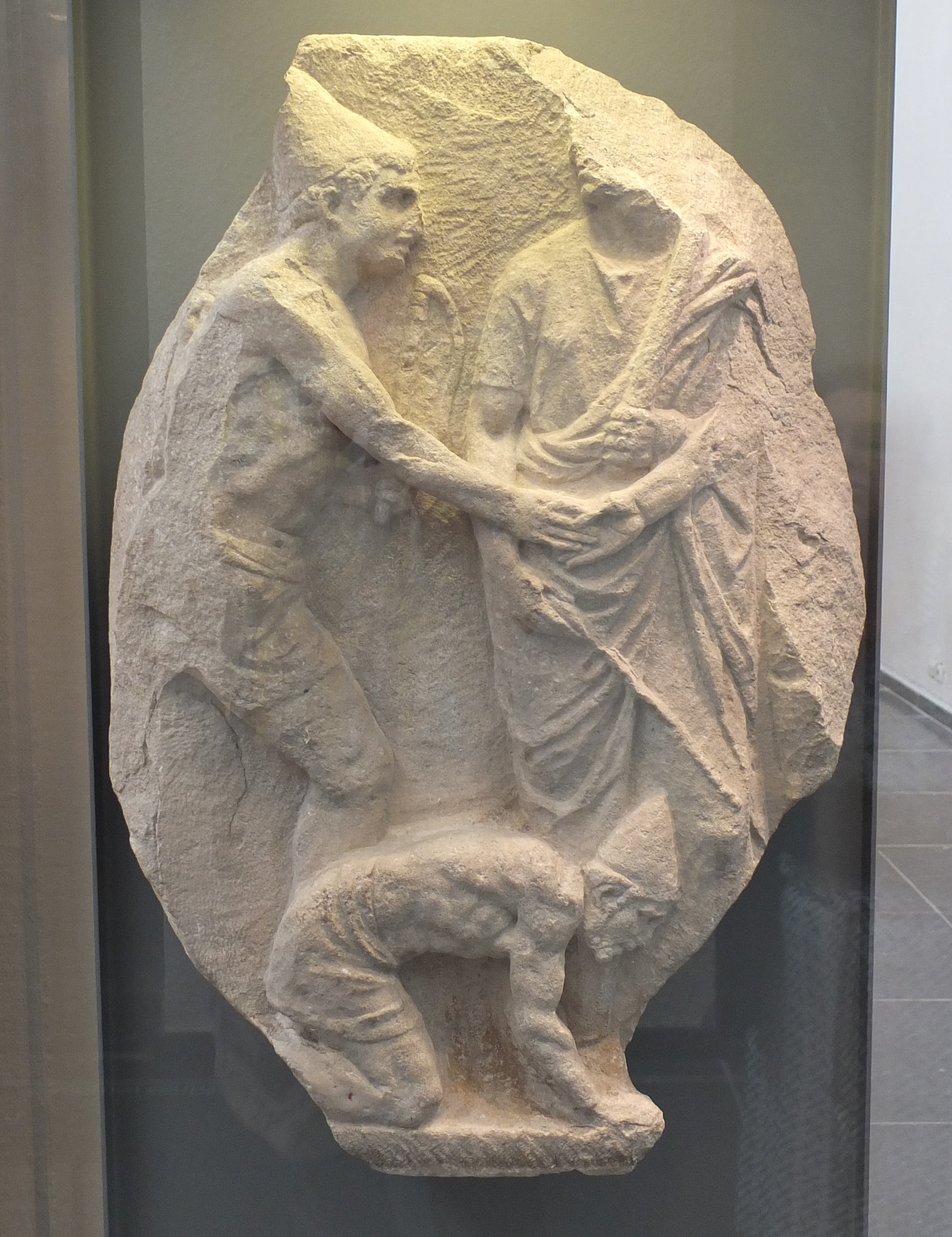
Fragment of a marble relief (1st century BC) depicting a manumission ceremony and the wearing of the pileus, a felt cap that was a symbol of liberation

Slaves were released from their master's control through the legal act of manumissio ("manumission"), meaning literally a "releasing from the hand" (de manu missio). The equivalent act for the releasing of a minor child from their father's legal power (potestas) was emancipatio, from which the English word "emancipation" derives. Both manumission and emancipation would involve transferral of some or most of any peculium (fund or property) the slave or minor had managed, less the self-purchase cost of the slave buying his freedom. That the two procedures are parallel in undoing the control of the paterfamilias is indicated by the legal fiction through which emancipatio occurred: technically, it was a sale (mancipatio) of the minor son three times at once, based on the archaic provision of the Twelve Tables that a son sold three times was freed of his father's potestas. (Note: See also "Parental sale".)

Slaves of the emperor's household (the familia Caesaris) were routinely manumitted at ages 30 to 35—an age that should not be taken as standard for other slaves. Within the familia Caesaris, a young woman in her reproductive years seems to have had the greatest chance for manumission, allowing her to marry and bear legitimate, free children, though in general women might not have expected manumission until their reproductive years had passed. (Note: Generally, fertility also is a motive for the purchase of female slaves; according to one survey of the evidence, more than 30 percent of women traded were of prime childbearing age (20 to 25).) A slave who had a large enough peculium might also buy the freedom of a fellow slave, a contubernalis with whom he had cohabited or a partner in business. Neither age nor length of service was automatic grounds for manumission; "masterly generosity was not the driving force behind the Romans' dealings with their slaves."

Scholars have differed on the rate of manumission. Manual laborers treated as chattel were least likely to be manumitted; skilled or highly educated urban slaves most likely. The hope was always greater than the reality, though it may have motivated some slaves to work harder and conform to the ideal of the "faithful servant". Dangling liberty as a reward, slaveholders could navigate the moral issues of enslaving people through placing the burden of merit on slaves—"good" slaves deserved freedom, and others did not. Manumission after a period of service may have been a negotiated outcome of contractual slavery, though a citizen who had entered willingly into unfree servitude was barred from full restoration of his rights.

There were three kinds of legally binding manumission: by the rod, by the census, and by the terms of the owner's will; all three were ratified by the state. The public ceremony of manumissio vindicta ("by the rod") was a fictitious trial (Note: The view of manumissio vindicta as a fictitious trial concerning rei vindicatio was promulgated by Mommsen; some scholars see it as a more straightforward procedure.) that had to be performed before a magistrate who held imperium; a Roman citizen declared the slave free, the owner did not contest it, the citizen touched the slave with a staff and pronounced a formula, and the magistrate confirmed it. The owner might also free the slave simply by having him entered in the official roll of citizens during census-taking; on principle, the censor had the unilateral power to free any slave to serve the interests of the state as a citizen. Slaves could also be freed in their owner's will (manumissio testamento), sometimes on condition of service or payment before or after freedom. A slave rewarded with manumission in a will at times also received a bequest, which might include transferring ownership of a contubernalis (informal marriage partner) to him or her. Heirs might choose to complicate testamentary manumission, as a common condition was that the slave had to buy his freedom from the heir, and a slave still fulfilling the condition of his freedom could be sold. If there was no rightful heir, a master might not only free the slave but make him the heir. A formal manumission could not be revoked by the patron, and Nero ruled that the state had no interest in doing so.

Freedom might also be granted informally, such as per epistulam, in a letter stating this intention, or inter amicos, "among friends", with the owner proclaiming a slave's freedom in front of witnesses. During the Republic, informal manumission did not confer citizen status, but Augustus took steps to clarify the status of those so freed. A law created "Junian Latin" status for these informally manumitted slaves, a sort of "half-way house between slavery and freedom" that, for example, did not confer the right to make a will.

In 2 BC, the lex Fufia Caninia limited the number of slaves that could be freed through a master's will in proportion to the size of the estate. Six years later, another law prohibited the manumission of slaves younger than thirty years of age, with some exceptions. Slaves of the emperor's own household were among those most likely to receive manumission, and the usual legal requirements did not apply.

By the early 4th century AD, when the Empire was becoming Christianized, slaves could be freed by a ritual in a church, officiated by an ordained bishop or priest. Constantine I promulgated edicts authorizing manumissio in ecclesia, manumission within a church, in AD 316 and 323, though the law was not put into effect in Africa till AD 401. Churches were allowed to manumit slaves among their membership, and clergy could free their own slaves by simple declaration without filing documents or the presence of witnesses. Laws such as the Novella 142 of Justinian in the 6th century gave bishops the power to free slaves.

=== Freedmen ===
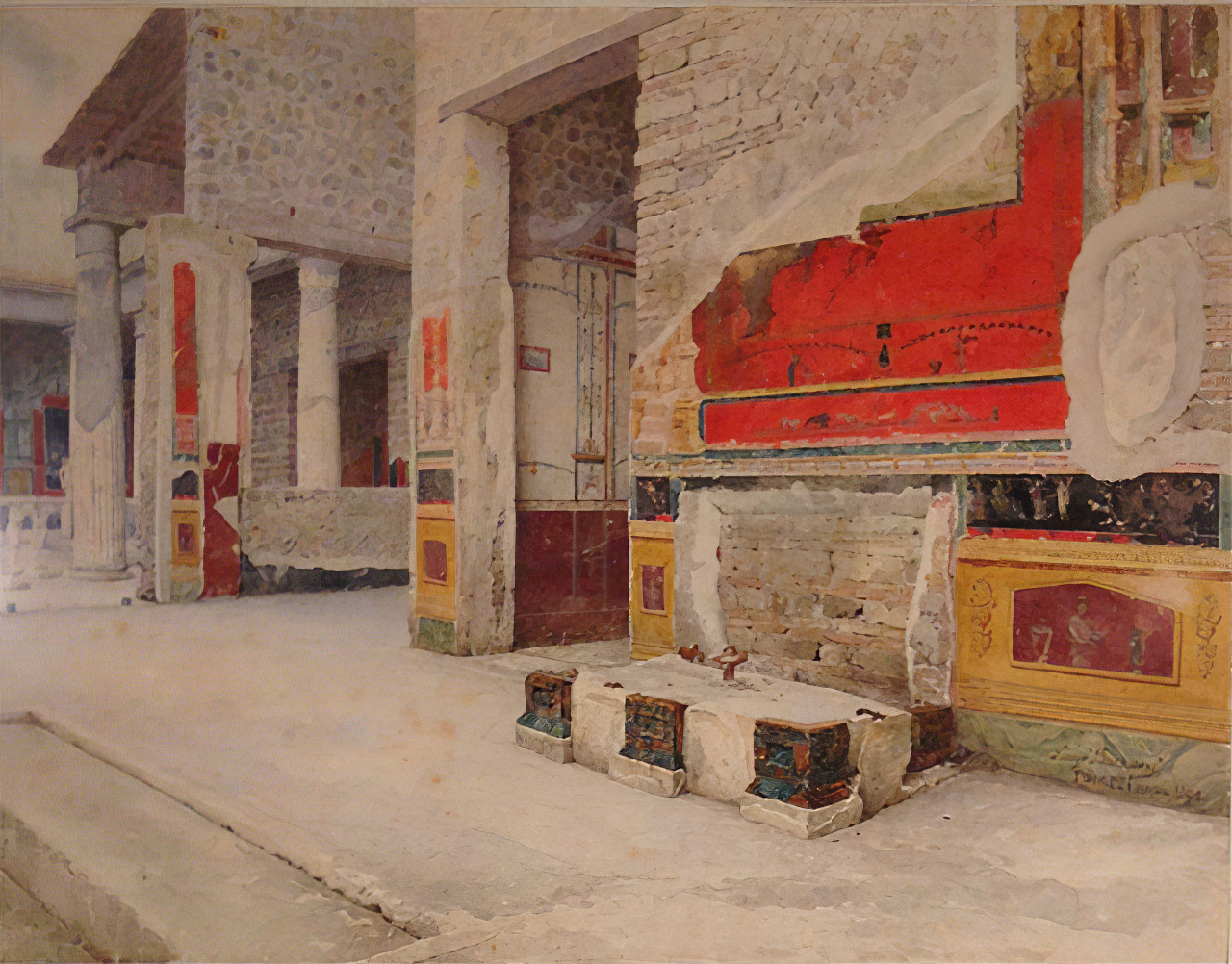
Illustration by Luigi Bazzani (1895) of the atrium of the House of the Vettii, thought to have been owned by freedmen

A male slave who had been legally manumitted by a Roman citizen enjoyed not only passive freedom from ownership, but active political freedom (libertas), including the right to vote. A slave who had acquired libertas was thus a libertus ("freed person", feminine liberta) in relation to his former master, who then became his patron (patronus). Freedmen and patrons had mutual obligations to each other within the traditional patronage network, and freedmen could "network" with other patrons as well. An edict in 118 BC stated that the freedman was legally responsible only for services or projects (operae) that had been spelled out as stipulations or sworn to in advance; money could not be demanded, and certain freedmen were exempt from any formal operae. The Lex Aelia Sentia of AD 4 allowed a patron to take his freedman to court for not carrying out his operae as outlined in their manumission agreement, but the possible penalties—which range in severity from a reprimand and fines to condemnation to hard labor—never include a return to enslavement.

As a social class, freed slaves were libertini, though later writers used the terms libertus and libertinus interchangeably. Libertini were not entitled to hold the "career track" magistracies or state priesthoods in the city of Rome, nor could they achieve senatorial rank. But they could hold neighborhood and local offices which entitled them to wear the toga praetexta, ordinarily reserved for those of higher rank, for ceremonial functions and their funeral rites. In the towns (municipia) of the provinces and later in towns with the status of colonia, inscriptions indicate that former slaves could be elected to all offices below the rank of praetor—a fact obscured by elite literature and ostensible legal barriers. Ulpian even holds that if a fugitive slave managed to be elected praetor, his legal acts would remain valid if his true status were discovered, because the Roman people had chosen to entrust him with power. Limitations were placed only on the former slaves themselves and did not apply to their sons.

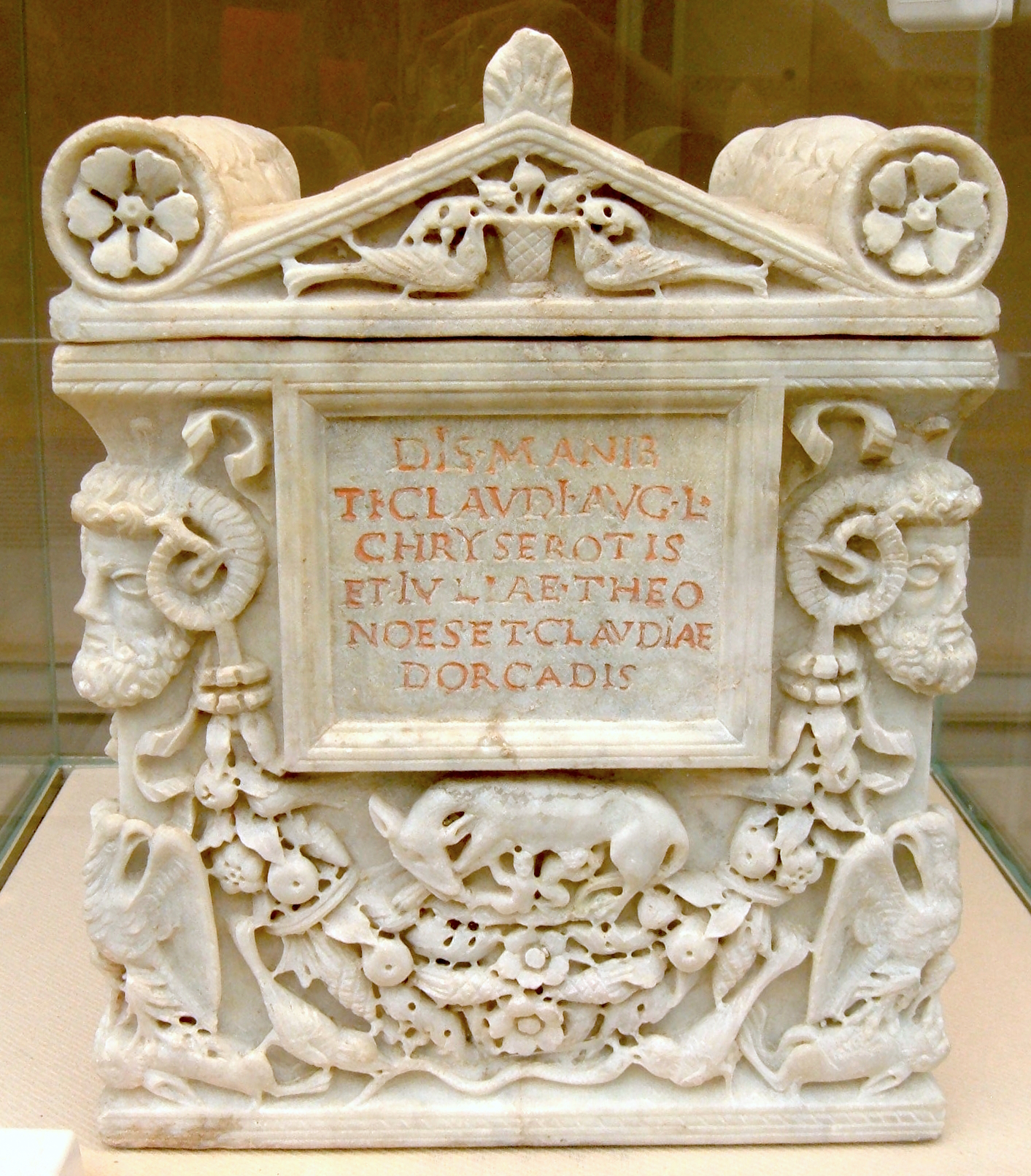
Cinerary urn for the freedman Tiberius Claudius Chryseros and two women, probably his wife and daughter

During the early Imperial period, some freedmen became very powerful. Those who were part of the emperor's household (familia Caesaris) could become key functionaries in the government bureaucracy. Some rose to positions of great influence, such as Narcissus, a former slave of the emperor Claudius. Their influence grew to such an extent under the Julio-Claudian emperors that Hadrian limited their participation by law.

More typical among freedmen success stories would be the cloak dealership of Lucius Arlenus Demetrius, enslaved from Cilicia, and Lucius Arlenus Artemidorus, from Paphlagonia, whose shared family name suggests that their partnership toward a solid, profitable business began during enslavement. A few freedmen became very wealthy. The brothers who owned the House of the Vettii, one of the biggest and most magnificent houses in Pompeii, are thought to have been freedmen. Building impressive tombs and monuments for themselves and their families was another way for freedmen to demonstrate their achievements. Despite their wealth and influence, they might still be looked down on by the traditional aristocracy as a vulgar nouveau riche. In the Satyricon, the character Trimalchio is a caricature of such a freedman.

=== Dediticii ===
Although in general freed slaves could become citizens, those categorized as dediticii held no rights even if freed. The jurist Gaius called the status of dediticius "the worst kind of freedom". Slaves whose masters had treated them as criminals—placing them in chains, tattooing or branding them, torturing them to confess a crime, imprisoning them, or sending them involuntarily to a gladiatorial school (ludus) or condemning them to fight with gladiators or wild beasts—if manumitted were counted as a potential threat to society along with enemies defeated in war, regardless of whether their master's punishments had been justified. If they came within a hundred miles of Rome, (Note: A perimeter of banishment is found in an unusual case of AD 9, when the Germans under Arminius captured Romans after the Battle of the Teutoburg Forest. Mistrusting the loyalty of the army of the Rhine, which would have preferred Germanicus as emperor, Tiberius only reluctantly permitted these prisoners of war to be ransomed, with the provision that they were banned from Italy. Vasile Lica, "Clades Variana and Postliminium", Historia 50:4 (2001), pp. 598 and 601, especially n. 31, notes that the soldiers should have been eligible for full postliminium restoration of their citizenship status (see "Enslavement of Roman citizens" above) but "politics was more important than the lex [law].") they were subject to reenslavement. Dediticii were excluded from the universal grant of Roman citizenship to all free inhabitants of the empire made by Caracalla in AD 212.

== Causes of enslavement ==
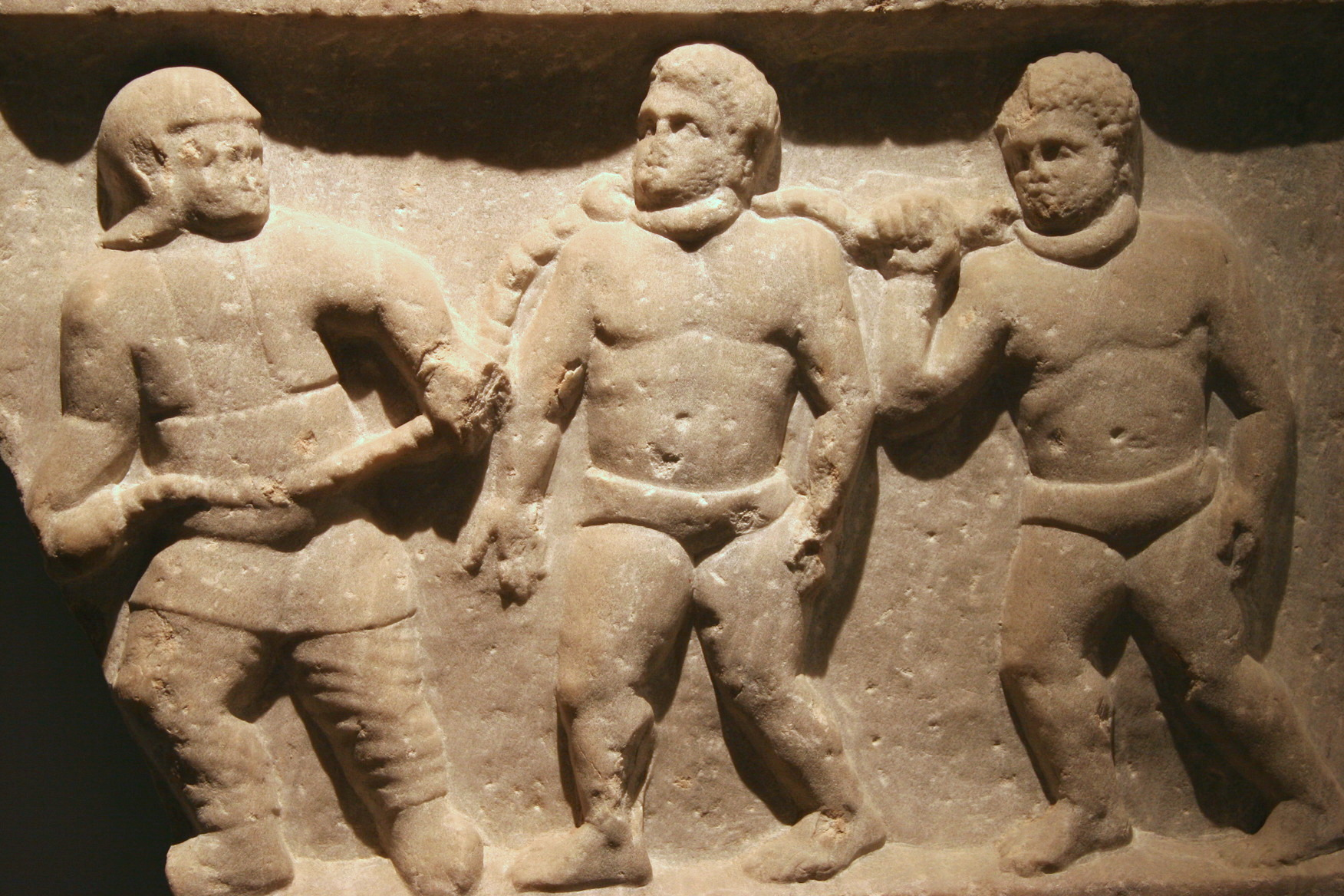
Relief from Smyrna (present-day İzmir, Turkey) depicting a Roman soldier leading captives in chains

"Slaves are either born or made" (servi aut nascuntur aut fiunt): in the ancient Roman world, people might become enslaved as a result of warfare, piracy and kidnapping, or child abandonment—the fear of falling into slavery, expressed frequently in Roman literature, was not just rhetorical exaggeration. A significant number of the enslaved population were vernae, born to a slave woman within a household (domus) or on a family farm or agricultural estate (villa). A few scholars have suggested that freeborn people selling themselves into slavery was a more frequent occurrence than literary sources alone would indicate. The relative proportion of these causes of enslavement within the slave population is hard to determine and remains a subject of scholarly debate.

=== War captives ===
During the Republican era (509–27 BC), warfare was arguably the greatest source of slaves, and certainly accounted for the marked increase in the number of slaves held by Romans during the Middle and Late Republic. A major battle might result in captives numbering in the hundreds to the tens of thousands. The newly enslaved were bought wholesale by dealers who followed the Roman legions. Once during the Gallic Wars, after his siege of the walled town of the Aduatuci, Julius Caesar sold the entire population, numbering 53,000 people, to slave dealers on the spot.

Warfare continued to produce slaves for Rome throughout the Imperial period, though war captives arguably became less important as a source around the beginning of the 1st century AD, after the major campaigns of Augustus, the first emperor, concluded in his later life. The smaller-scale, less continual warfare of the so-called Pax Romana of the 1st and 2nd centuries still produced slaves "in more than trivial numbers".

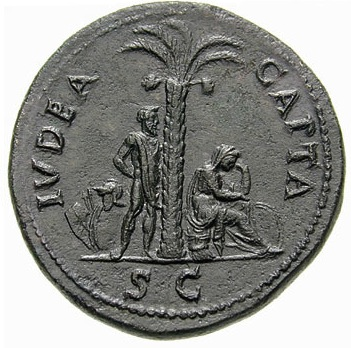
Reverse of a sestertius issued by Vespasian, one among a twenty-five-year series of Iudaea capta coins depicting a personification of the defeated province of Judaea

As an example of the impact on one community, it was during this period that the greatest numbers of slaves from the province of Judaea were traded, as a result of the Jewish–Roman wars (AD 66–135). The Jewish historian Josephus reports that the Great Jewish Revolt of AD 66–70 alone resulted in the enslavement of 97,000 people. The future emperor Vespasian sold 30,400 war captives from Tarichaea into slavery after executing those who were old or infirm; another 6,000 young captives were sent to work on the Corinth Canal. When Vespasian's son and future successor Titus captured the city of Japha, he killed all the men and sold 2,130 women and children into slavery. What appears to have been a unique instance of over-supply in the Roman market for slaves occurred in AD 137 after the Bar Kokhba revolt was quashed and more than 100,000 slaves were put on the market. A Jewish slave for a time could be bought at Hebron or Gaza for the same price as a horse.

The demand for slaves may account for some expansionist actions that seem to have no other political motive—Britain, Mauretania, and Dacia may have been desirable conquests primarily as sources of manpower, and so too Roman campaigns across the frontiers of their African provinces.

==== Captivi in Roman culture ====
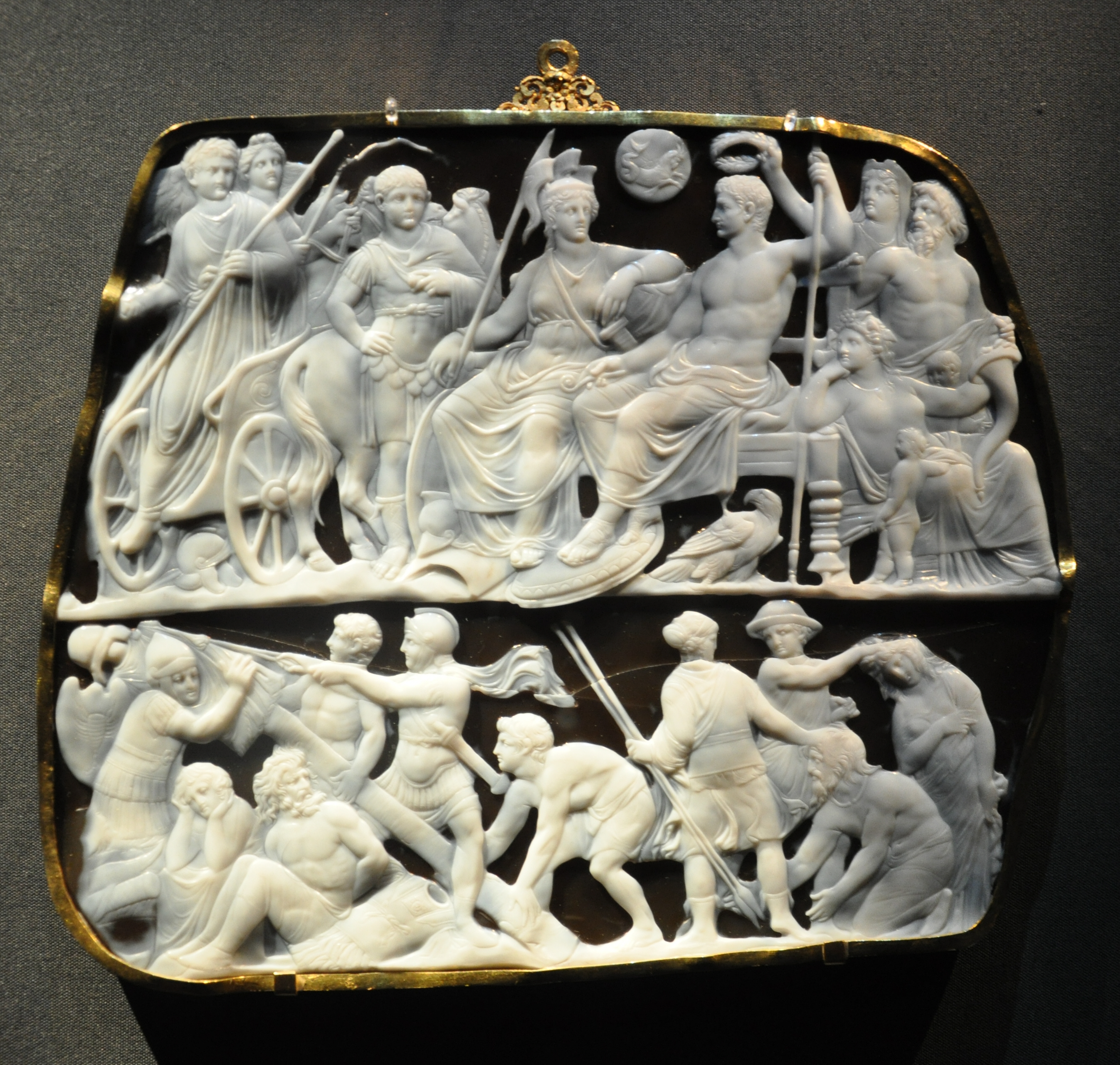
The Gemma Augustea onyx cameo depicting the elevated Augustus receiving a wreath (corona) amid divinities; below, soldiers erect a war trophy and ready captives for sale

The Digest offers an etymology that connects the word servus to war captivity as an alternative to killing the defeated: "Slaves (servi) are so called because commanders sell captives and through this make it usual to save (servare) and not kill them." One of the myths of Romulus was that he began the practice of integrating war captives into Roman society through enslaving rather than slaughtering them. Julius Caesar concluded his campaign against the Gallic Veneti by executing their senate but selling the survivors sub corona, "under the wreath". War booty, including conquered land, was customarily auctioned sub hasta, "under the spear" symbolic of Roman sovereignty, and "to sell under the spear" came to mean simply "to auction off". But war captives were said to be sold sub corona, "under the wreath" because in early times they would have been wreathed (Note: In contrast to those wearing a cap (the pilleati) indicating that the seller offered no warranty on the slaves.) like a sacrificial victim (hostia, which Ovid relates to hostis, "enemy").

Roman culture produced artistic responses to the visibility of captives as early as the Punic Wars, when the comic playwright Plautus wrote the Captivi ("Captives", ca. 200 BC). The cultural assumption that enslavement was a natural result of defeat in war is reflected in the ubiquity of Imperial art depicting captives, an image that appears not only in public contexts that serve overt purposes of propaganda and triumphalism but also on objects that seem intended for household and personal display, such as figurines, lamps, Arretine pottery, and gems.

=== Piracy and kidnapping ===
Piracy has a long history in human trafficking. The primary goal of kidnapping was not enslavement but maximizing profit, as the relatives of captives were expected to pay ransom. People who cared about getting the captive back were motivated to pay more than a stranger would if the captive were auctioned as a slave, since the price would be determined by the captive's individual qualities, but sometimes the ransom demand could not be met. If a slave was kidnapped, the owner might or might not decide that the amount of ransom was worthwhile. If multiple people from the same city were taken at the same time and demands for payment could not be met privately, the home city might try to pay the ransom from public funds, but these efforts too might come up short. The captive could then resort to borrowing the ransom money from profiteering lenders, in effect putting himself into debt bondage to them. Selling the kidnap victim on the open market was a last but not infrequent resort.

No traveler was safe; Julius Caesar himself was captured by Cilician pirates as a young man. When the pirates realized his high value, they set his ransom at twenty talents. As the story came to be told, Caesar insisted that they raise it to fifty. He spent thirty-eight days in captivity as they waited for the ransom to be delivered. Upon release, he is said to have returned and subjected his captors to the form of execution by custom reserved for slaves, crucifixion.

Within the Jewish community, rabbis usually encouraged buying back enslaved Jews, but advised that "one should not ransom captives for more than their value, for the good order of the world" because inflated ransoms would only "motivate Romans to enslave even more Jews". In the early Church, ransoming captives was considered a work of charity (caritas), and after the Empire came under Christian rule, churches spent "enormous funds" to buy back Christian prisoners.

Systematic piracy for the purpose of human trafficking was most rampant in the 2nd century BC, when the city of Side in Pamphylia (within present-day Turkey) was a center of the trade. Pompey was credited with eradicating piracy from the Mediterranean in 67 BC, but actions were taken against Illyrian pirates in 31 BC following the Battle of Actium, and piracy was still a concern addressed during the reigns of Augustus and Tiberius. While large-scale piracy was more or less controlled during the Pax Romana, piratical kidnapping continued to contribute to the Roman slave supply into the later Imperial era, though it may not have been a major source of new slaves. In the early 5th century AD, Augustine of Hippo was still lamenting wide-scale kidnapping in North Africa. The Christian missionary Patricius, from Roman Britain, was kidnapped by pirates around AD 400 and taken as a slave to Ireland, where he continued work that eventually led to his canonization as Saint Patrick.

=== Vernae ===
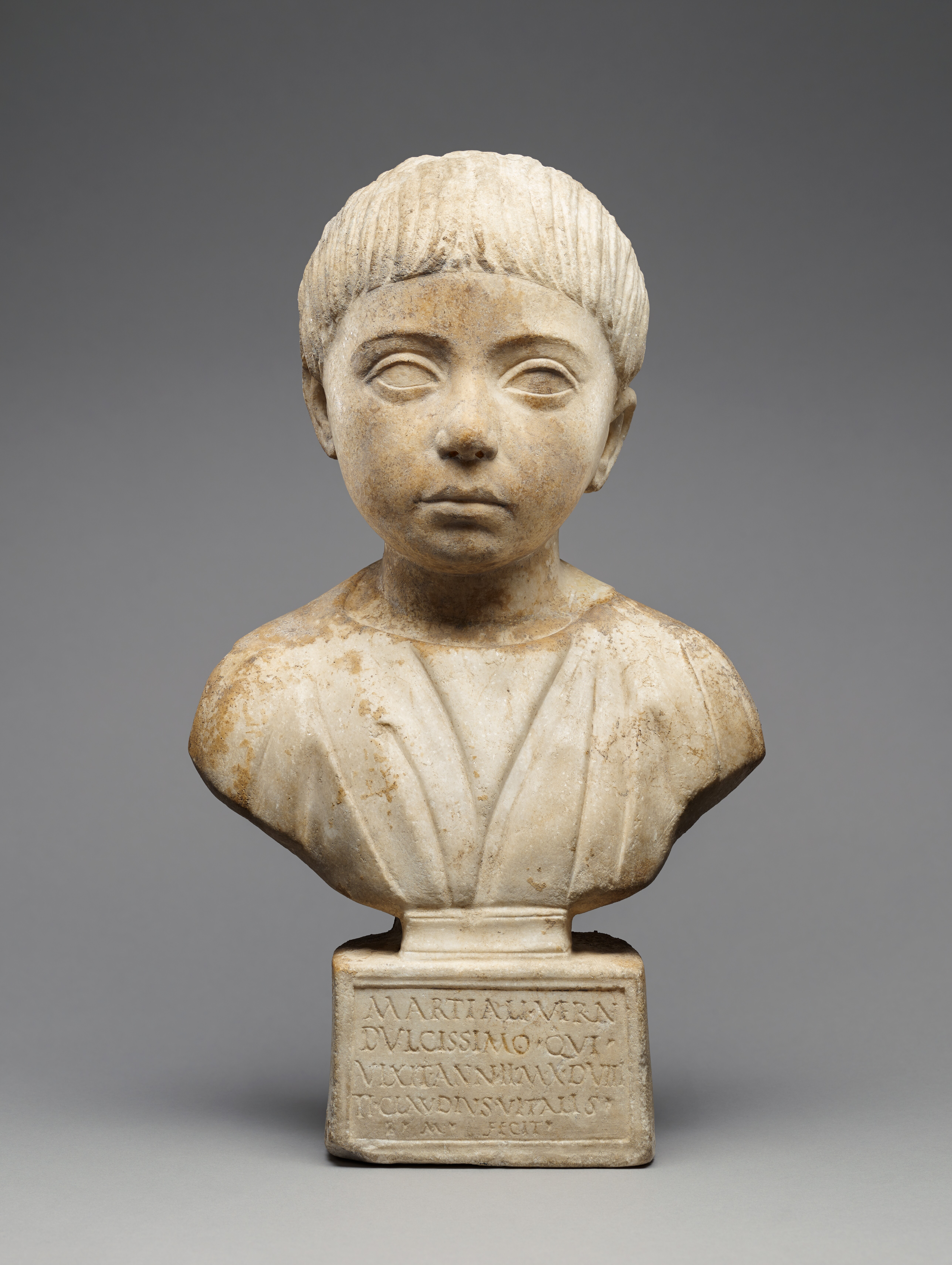
Funerary bust (AD 100–115) commemorating a verna named Martialis, who died just under the age of three (digital image courtesy of Getty's Open Content Program)

By the common law of nations (ius gentium), the child of a legally enslaved mother was born a slave. The Latin word for a slave born within the familia of a household (domus) or agricultural estate (villa) was verna, plural vernae.

There was a stronger social obligation to care for one's vernae, whose epitaphs sometimes identify them as such, and at times they would have been the biological children of free men of the household. Frequent mention of vernae in literary sources indicates that home-reared slaves not only were preferred to those obtained in slave markets but received preferential treatment. Vernae were more likely to be allowed to cohabit as a couple (contubernium) and rear their own children. A child verna might be reared alongside the owner's own child of the same age, even sharing the same wet-nurse. They had greater opportunities for education and might be educated along with the freeborn children of the household. Many "intellectual slaves" were vernae. A dedicatory inscription dating to AD 198 lists the names of twenty-four imperial freedmen who were teachers (paedagogi); six are identified as vernae. The use of verna in the epitaphs of freedmen suggests that former slaves might take pride in their birth within a familia.

But birth as a verna could have a darker side, depending on what kind of "house" the child was born and reared in. Vernae born to enslaved brothel workers were advertised as such in graffiti from Pompeii, sometimes with a price or the sexual service they provided. Of the vernae attested epigraphically at Pompeii, 71% are connected to prostitution, and their brothel upbringing seems to have been regarded as a selling point.

==== Alumni ====
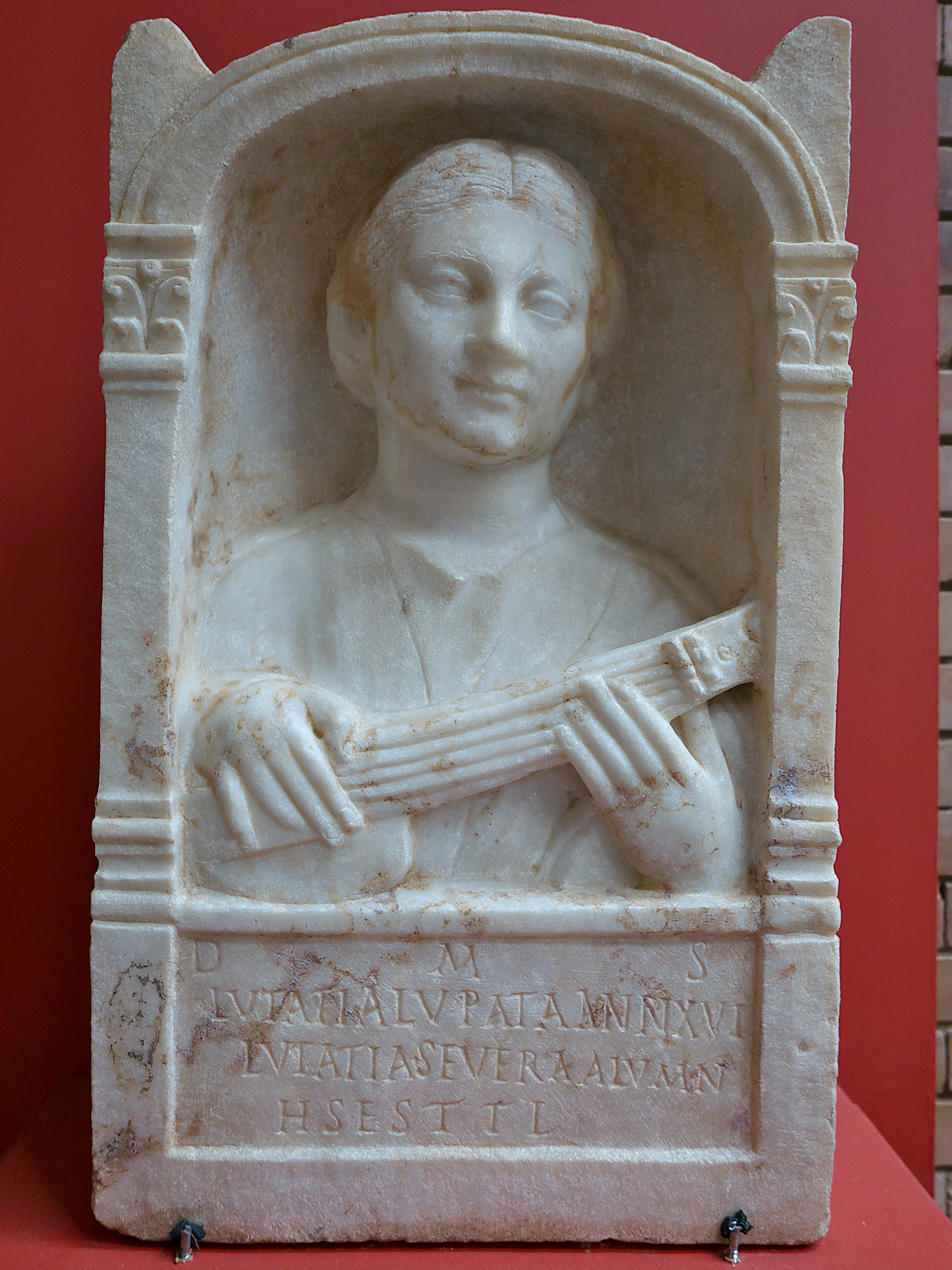
Funerary monument (AD 101–125) for the 16-year-old alumna Lutatia Lupata, playing a pandura

Children brought into a household to be fostered without formal adoption were alumni (plural; feminine alumnae), "those who have been nurtured". (Note: Most Roman adoptions were of an adult son to carry on the family line when there were no heirs. Adoption was a complex legal process involving inheritance rights and concomitant duties to the house and family gods, and not a usual way to bring a young child into a family to nurture.) Even if cared for lovingly, alumni often had an ambiguous legal status. The term alumni is used for a range of foster children, including orphans, "poor relations", and apprentices, most often attested between the ages of 9 and 14, mainly in prosperous urbanized areas. Of attested alumni, about a quarter can be securely identified as slaves; the place of alumni as slaves in the household seems similar to that of vernae in terms of privileges. A child chosen for nurturing would not be pledged as surety for a loan nor subject to seizure by creditors.

Alumni often became trusted members of the familia, and those of enslaved status seem to have had a good chance of manumission. They are sometimes explicitly provided for in wills; for example, a trust was left to one young freedman alumnus that was to be administered by the fosterer's friend until he reached the age of twenty-five. The number of alumni and vernae associated with the arts and crafts suggests that talent was a way disadvantaged children might be noticed and obtain opportunities.

=== Child labor ===
In families that had to work, whether technically free or enslaved, children could begin acquiring work habits as early as age five, when they became developmentally capable of carrying out small tasks. The transitional period from early childhood (infantia) to functional childhood (pueritia) occurred among the Romans from the ages of five to seven, with the upper classes enjoying a more prolonged and sheltered infantia and pueritia, as in most cultures. In general, ten was the age at which child slaves were regarded as useful enough to be traded as such. Among working people of some means, a child slave might be an investment; an example from the juristic Digest is a metalsmith who buys a child slave, teaches him the trade, and then sells him at double the original price paid. Apprenticeship contracts exist for free and slave children, with few differences in terms between the two.

Training for skilled work typically started at ages 12 to 14, lasting six months to six years, depending on the occupation. Jobs for which child slaves apprenticed include textile production, metalworking such as nail-making and coppersmithing, mirror-making, shorthand and other secretarial skills, accounting, music and the arts, baking, ornamental gardening, and construction techniques. Incidental mentions in literary texts suggest that training programs were methodical: boys learned to be barbers by using a deliberately blunt razor.

In wealthy, socially active households of the Imperial era, prepubescent children (impuberes) were trained for serving food, as their sexual purity was thought to confer hygienic benefits. A capsarius was a child attendant who went to school with the master's children, carrying their things and attending lessons with them. Large households might train their own staff, some even running in-house schools, or send slaves ages 12 to 18 to paedagogia, imperially run vocational schools providing skills and refinement. Adolescent slaves as young as 13 might be capably employed in accounting and other office work, as well as serving as heralds, messengers, and couriers.

Performing arts troupes were a mix of free and enslaved people that might tour independently or be sponsored by a household, and children are widely attested among the entertainers. Some of the youngest performers are gymnici, acrobats or artistic gymnasts. Child slaves are also found as dancers and singers, preparing as professionals for popular forms of musical theater.

Typically on a farm, children start helping out with age-appropriate tasks quite early. Ancient sources that mention very young children born into rural slavery have them feeding and tending chickens or other poultry, picking up sticks, learning how to weed, gathering apples, and minding the farm's donkey. Young children were not expected to work all day long. Older children might tend small flocks of animals that were driven out in the morning and returned before nightfall.

Modern-era mining employed child labor into the early 20th century, and there is some evidence that children worked in certain kinds of ancient Roman mining. Impuberes documented at mines that mostly relied on free workers are likely to be part of mining families, though wax tablets from a mine in Alburnus Maior records the purchase of two children, ages 6 and 10 (or 15). (Note: The age of the second child is less legible) Children seem to have been employed especially in gold mines, crawling into the narrowest parts of shafts to retrieve loose ore, which was passed to the outside in baskets hand to hand.

Osteoarchaeology can identify adolescents and children as working alongside adults, but not whether they were free or enslaved. Children can be difficult to distinguish from slaves both in verbal sources, as puer could mean either "boy" or "male slave" (pais in Greek), and in art, as slaves were often depicted as smaller in proportion to free subjects to show their lesser status, and children older than infants and toddlers often look like small adults in art. Since as a matter of Roman law, a father had the right to contract out all dependents of a household for labor, among workers who were still minors there is often little practical difference between free and slave.

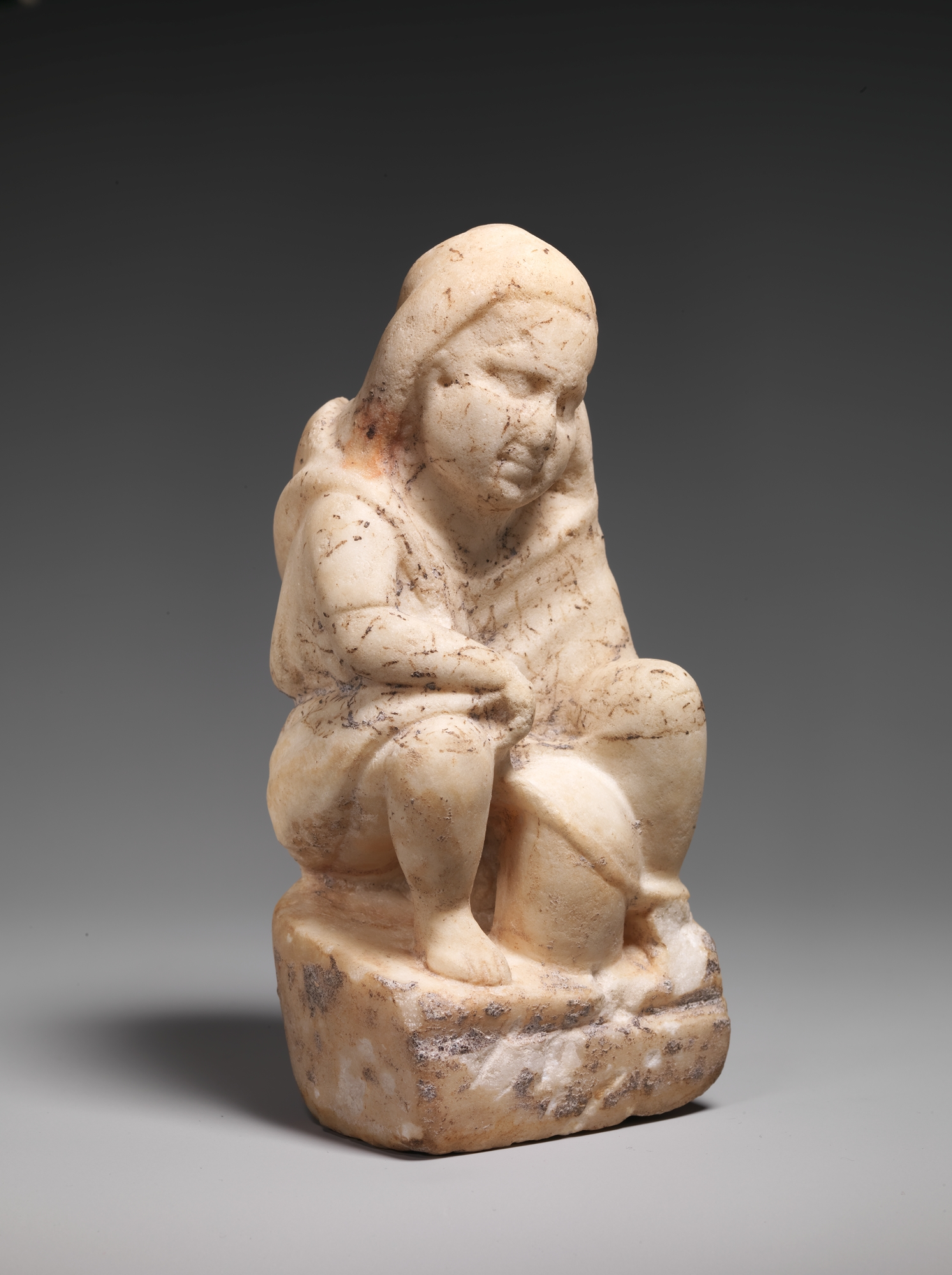
Statuette of a slave boy waiting with a lantern for his master (1st–2nd century AD)

==== Child abandonment ====
Scholarly views vary on the extent to which child abandonment in its several forms was a significant source for potential slaves. The children of poor citizens who were left orphaned were vulnerable to enslavement, and at least some children brought into a household to be fostered as alumni had a legal status as slaves. A tradesman might foster an abandoned child as an alumnus and apprentice him, an arrangement that does not preclude affection and could result in passing along the business with an expectation of care in old age. One way early Christians grew their community was by taking in abandoned and orphaned children, and "house churches" might have been safe havens where slave-born and free children of all statuses mingled.

However, slave traffickers would have preyed on neglected children who were old enough to be out and about on their own, enticing them with "sweets, cakes, and toys". Child slaves obtained in this way were especially in danger of being reared as prostitutes or gladiators or even being maimed to make them more pitiable as beggars.

==== Infant exposure ====
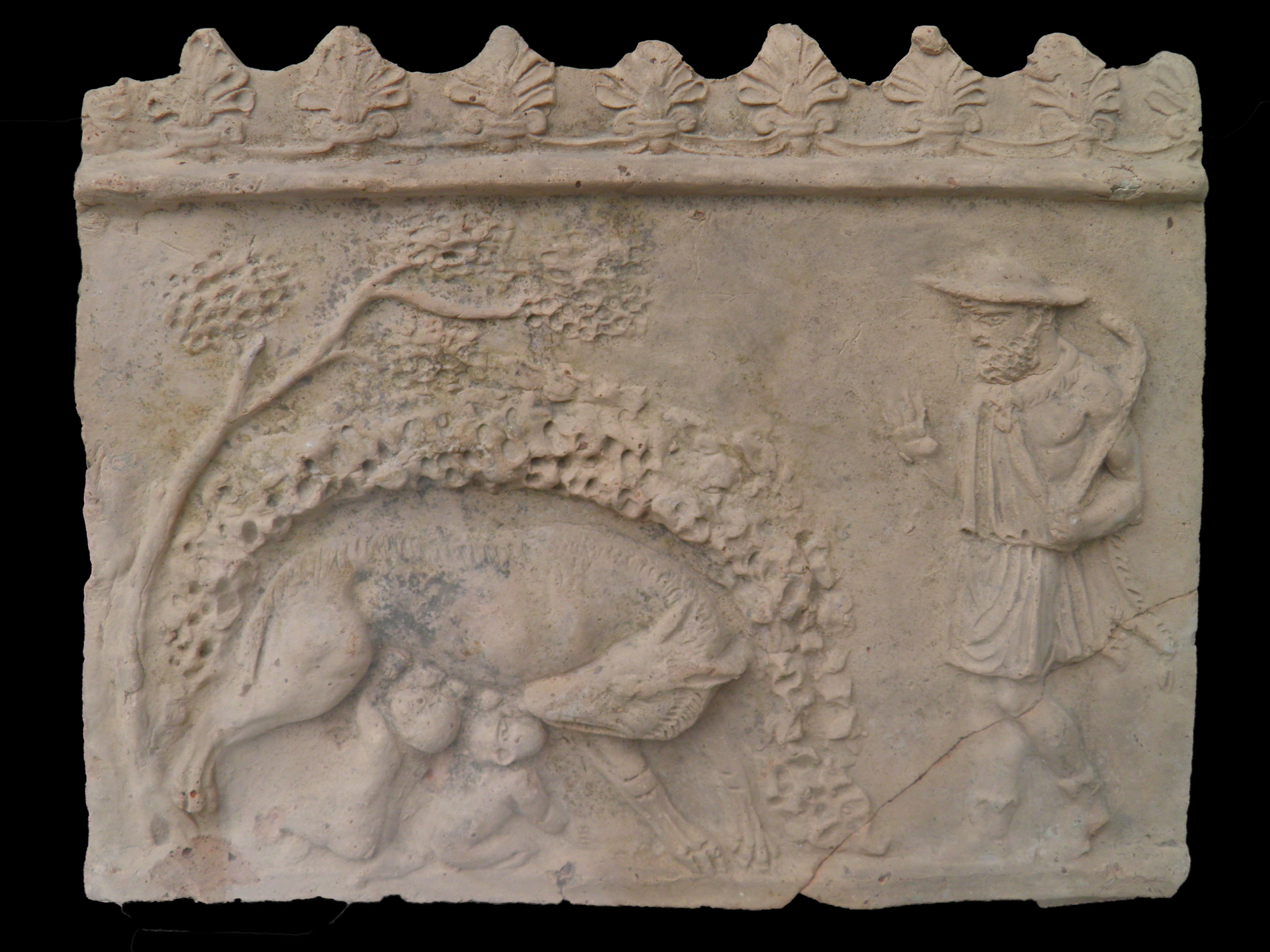
Infant exposure with subsequent fosterage is a narrative premise in one of the best-known Roman myths: in this relief (2nd century AD), the shepherd Faustulus finds the twins Romulus and Remus nursing at the she-wolf under the sacred fig tree.

Child abandonment, whether through the death of family or intentionally, is to be distinguished from infant exposure (expositio), which the Romans seem to have practiced widely and which is embedded in the founding myth of the exposed twins Romulus and Remus suckling at the she-wolf. Families who could not afford to raise a child might expose an unwanted infant—usually imagined as abandoning it under outdoor conditions that were likely to cause its death, thus a means of infanticide. A serious birth defect was considered grounds for exposure even among the upper classes. One view is that healthy infants who survived exposure were usually enslaved and were even a significant source of slaves.

A healthy exposed infant might be taken in for fosterage or adoption by a family, but even this practice could treat the child as an investment: if the birth family later wished to reclaim their offspring, they were entitled to do so but had to reimburse expenses for nurturance. Traffickers also could pick up surviving infants and rear them with training as slaves, but since children under the age of five are unlikely to provide much labor of value, it is unclear how investing the five years of adult labor in nurturing would be profitable.

Infant exposure as a source of slaves also assumes predictable sites where traders could expect a regular "harvest"; successful births would be most concentrated in urban environments, and likely sites for infant depositories are temples and other religious sites such as the obscure Columna Lactaria, the "Milk Column" landmark about which little is known. The satirist Juvenal writes of supposititious children taken up from the dregs to the bosom of the goddess Fortuna, who laughs as she sends them off to the great houses of noble families to be quietly reared as their own. Large households staffed wet nurses and other childcare attendants who would share childrearing duties for foster children (alumni) and all infants of the household, free or slave.

Some parents may have arranged to hand over the neonate directly for payment as a sort of ex post facto surrogacy. Constantine, the first Christian emperor, formalized the buying and selling of newborns during the first hours of life, when the newborn was still sanguinolentus, bloody before the first bath. At a time when infant mortality might have been as high as 40 percent, the newborn was thought in its first week of life to be in a perilous liminal state between biological existence and social birth, and the first bath was one of many rituals marking this transition and supporting the mother and child. The Constantinian law has been viewed as an effort to stop the practice of exposure as infanticide or as "an insurance policy on behalf of individual slave-owners" designed to protect the property of those who, unknowingly or not, had bought an infant later claimed or shown to have been born free. In the historical period, expositio may actually have become a legal fiction whereby the parents surrendered the newborn during the first week of life, before it had been ritually accepted and legally registered as part of the birth family, and transferred potestas over the infant to the new family from the beginning of its life.

==== Parental sale ====
The ancient right of patria potestas entitled fathers to dispose of their dependents as they saw fit. They could sell their children just as they did slaves, though in practice, the father who sold his child was likely too impoverished to own slaves. The father relinquished his power (potestas) over the child, who entered the possession (mancipium) of a master. A law of the Twelve Tables (5th century BC) limited the number of times a father could sell his children: a daughter only once, but a son as many as three. This kind of serial selling only of the son suggests nexum, a temporary obligation as a result of debt which was formally abolished by the end of the 4th century BC. A dodge around freeborn status that continued into late antiquity was to lease the minor child's labor up to age 20 or 25, so that the holder of the lease did not own the child as property but had full-time use through the legal transfer of potestas.

Roman law thus grappled with the tensions among the supposed sanctity of free birth, patria potestas, and the reality that parents might be driven by poverty or debt to sell their children. Potestas meant that there was no legal penalty for the parent as seller. The sales contract itself was always technically void because of the traded child's free status, which if unknown to the buyer entitled him to a refund. Even if the sale had not been contracted as temporary, parents who came into better days could restore their children to free status by paying the original sale price plus 20 percent to cover the costs of their care during servitude.

Most parents would have sold their children only under extreme duress. In the mid-80s BC, parents in the province of Asia said they were forced to sell their children in order to pay the heavy taxes levied by Sulla as proconsul In late antiquity, selling off the family's children was viewed in Christian rhetoric as a symptom of moral decay caused by taxation, moneylenders, the government, and prostitution. Ancient sources that moralize from an upper-class perspective about parents selling children may at times be misrepresenting contracts for apprenticeships and labor that were necessary for wage-earning families, especially since many of these were arranged by mothers.

The Christianization of the later empire shifted priorities within the inherent contradictions of this legal framework. Constantine, the first Christian emperor, tried to alleviate hunger as one condition that led to child-selling by ordering local magistrates to distribute free grain to poor families, later abolishing the "power of life and death" the paterfamilias had held.

=== Debt slavery ===
Nexum was a debt bondage contract in the early Roman Republic. Within the Roman legal system, it was a form of mancipatio. Though the terms of the contract would vary, essentially a free man pledged himself as a bond slave (nexus) as surety for a loan. He might also hand over his son as collateral. Although the bondsman could expect to face humiliation and some abuse, as a citizen under the law he was supposed to be exempt from corporal punishment. Nexum was abolished by the Lex Poetelia Papiria in 326 BC.

Roman historians illuminated the abolition of nexum with a traditional story that varied in its particulars; broadly, a nexus who was a handsome, upstanding youth suffered sexual harassment by the holder of the debt. The cautionary tale highlighted the incongruities of subjecting one free citizen to another's use, and the legal response was aimed at establishing the citizen's right to liberty (libertas), as distinguished from the slave or social outcast (infamis).

Although nexum was abolished as a way to secure a loan, a form of debt bondage might still result after a debtor defaulted. It remained illegal to enslave a free person for this reason or to pledge a minor to secure a parent's debt, and the legal penalties attached to the creditor, not the debtor.

=== Self-sales ===
The liberty of the Roman citizen was an "inviolable" principle of Roman law, and therefore it was illegal for a freeborn person to sell himself—in theory. In practice, self-enslavement might be overlooked unless one of the parties took issue with the terms of the contract. "Self-sales" are not well represented in Roman literature, presumably because they were shameful and against the law. The limited evidence is primarily to be found in Imperial legal sources, which indicate that "self-sale" as a path to enslavement was as well recognized as being captured in war or being born to an enslaved mother.

Self-sales are in evidence mainly when challenged in court on grounds of fraud. A case for fraud could be made if the seller or the buyer knew that the enslaved person was freeborn (ingenuus) at the time of sale when the trafficked person himself did not. Fraud could also be alleged if the person sold had been under the age of twenty. Legal argumentation makes it clear that protecting the buyer's investment was a priority, but if either of these circumstances was proved, the liberty of the enslaved person could be reclaimed.

Since it was difficult to prove who knew what when, the most solid evidence for voluntary enslavement was whether the formerly free person had consented by receiving a share of the proceeds from the sale. A person who knowingly surrendered the rights of Roman citizenship was thought unworthy of holding them, and permanent enslavement was thus considered an appropriate consequence. Self-sale by a Roman soldier would be a form of desertion, and execution was the penalty. Romans enslaved as prisoners of war were similarly deemed ineligible to have their citizenship restored if they had surrendered their liberty without fighting hard enough to keep it (see the enslavement of Roman citizens above); as the Roman Republic devolved, political rhetoric feverishly urged citizens to resist the shame of falling into "slavery" under one-man rule.

However, self-sale cases that made it to the level of imperial appeal often resulted in voiding the contract, even if the enslaved person had consented, as a private contract did not override the state's interest in regulating citizenship, which carried tax obligations.

== The slave economy ==
During the period of Roman imperial expansion, the increase in wealth amongst the Roman elite and the substantial growth of slavery transformed the economy. Multitudes of slaves were brought to Italy and purchased by wealthy landowners to labor on their estates. Land investment and agricultural production generated great wealth; in the view of Keith Hopkins, Rome's military conquests and the subsequent introduction of vast wealth and slaves into Italy had effects comparable to widespread and rapid technological innovation.

Scholars differ on how the particulars of Roman slavery as an institution can be framed within theories of labor markets in the overall economy. Economic historian Peter Temin has argued that "Rome had a functioning labor market and a unified labor force" in which slavery played an integral role. Since wages could be earned by both free and some enslaved workers, and fluctuated in response to labor shortages, the condition of mobility required for market dynamism was met by the number of free workers seeking wages and skilled slaves with an incentive to earn.

=== The slave trade ===
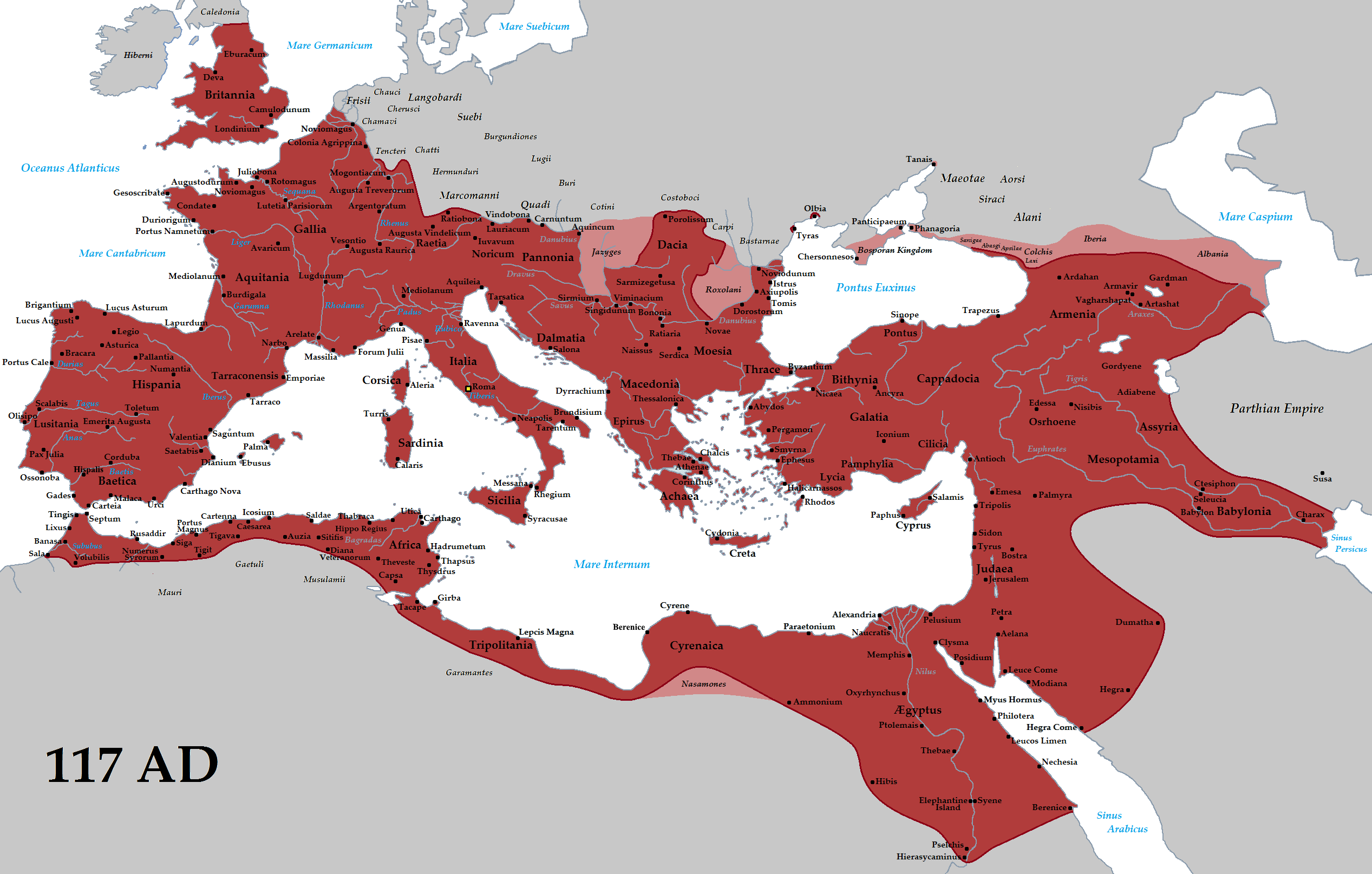
The Roman Empire at its greatest extent during the reign of Trajan

What the Roman jurist Papinian referred to as "the regular, daily traffic in slaves" (Adsidua et cottidiana comparatio servorum) involved every part of the Roman Empire and occurred across borders as well. The trade was only lightly regulated by law. Slave markets seem to have existed in most cities of the Empire, but outside Rome the largest center was Ephesus. The major centers of the Imperial slave trade were in Italy, the north Aegean, Asia Minor, and Syria. Mauretania and Alexandria were also significant.

The largest market on the Italian peninsula, as might be expected, was the city of Rome, where the most notorious slave-traders set up shop next to the Temple of Castor at the Forum Romanum. Puteoli may have been the second busiest. Trading also occurred at Brundisium, Capua, and Pompeii. Slaves were imported from across the Alps to Aquileia.

The rise and fall of Delos is an example of the volatility and disruptions of the slave trade. In the eastern Mediterranean, policing by the Ptolemaic Kingdom and Rhodes had kept some check on piratical kidnapping and illegal slave trading until Rome, on the wave of their unexpected success against Carthage, expanded trade and exerted dominance eastward. (Note: The policing action of Rhodes has also been seen as a "naval protection racket" that allowed it to exercise control over shipping in the name of suppressing "piracy") The long-established port of Rhodes, known as a "law and order" state, had legal and regulatory barriers to exploitation by the new Italian "entrepreneurs", who got a more porous reception in Delos as they set up shop in the latter 3rd century BC. To disadvantage Rhodes, and ultimately devastating its economy, in 166 BC the Romans declared Delos a free port, meaning that merchants there would no longer have to pay the 2 percent customs tax. The piratical slave trade then flooded into Delos "with no questions asked" about the source and status of captives. While the geographer Strabo's figure of 10,000 slaves traded daily is more hyperbole than statistic, slaves became the number one Delian commodity. The large commercial agricultural operations in Sicily (latifundia) likely received great numbers of Delian-traded Syrian and Cilician slaves, who went on to lead the years-long slave rebellions of 135 and 104 BC.

But as the Romans established better-located and more sophisticated trading centers in the East, Delos lost its privilege as a free port and was left to be sacked in 88 and 69 BC during the Mithridatic Wars, from which it never recovered. Other cities such as Mytilene may have taken up the slack. The Delian slave economy had been artificially exuberant, and by averting their gaze the Romans exacerbated the piracy problem that would vex them for centuries.

Major sources of slaves from the East include Lydia, Caria, Phrygia, Galatia, and Cappadocia, for which Ephesus was a center of trade. Aesop, the Phrygian writer of fables, was supposed to have been sold at Ephesus. Pergamum is likely to have had "regular and heavy" slave trading, as is the prosperous city of Acmonia in Phrygia. Strabo (1st century AD) describes Apameia in Phrygia as ranking second in trade only to Ephesus in the region, observing that it was "the common warehouse for those from Italy and from Greece"—a center for imports from the west, with slaves the most likely commodity for export trade. Markets are also likely to have existed in Syria and Judaea, though direct evidence is thin.

In the north Aegean, a large memorial to a slave trader in Amphipolis suggests that this might have been a location where Thracian slaves were traded. Byzantium was a market for the Black Sea slave trade, and slaves coming from Bithynia, Pontus, Scythia, and Paphlagonia would have been traded in the cities of the Propontis.

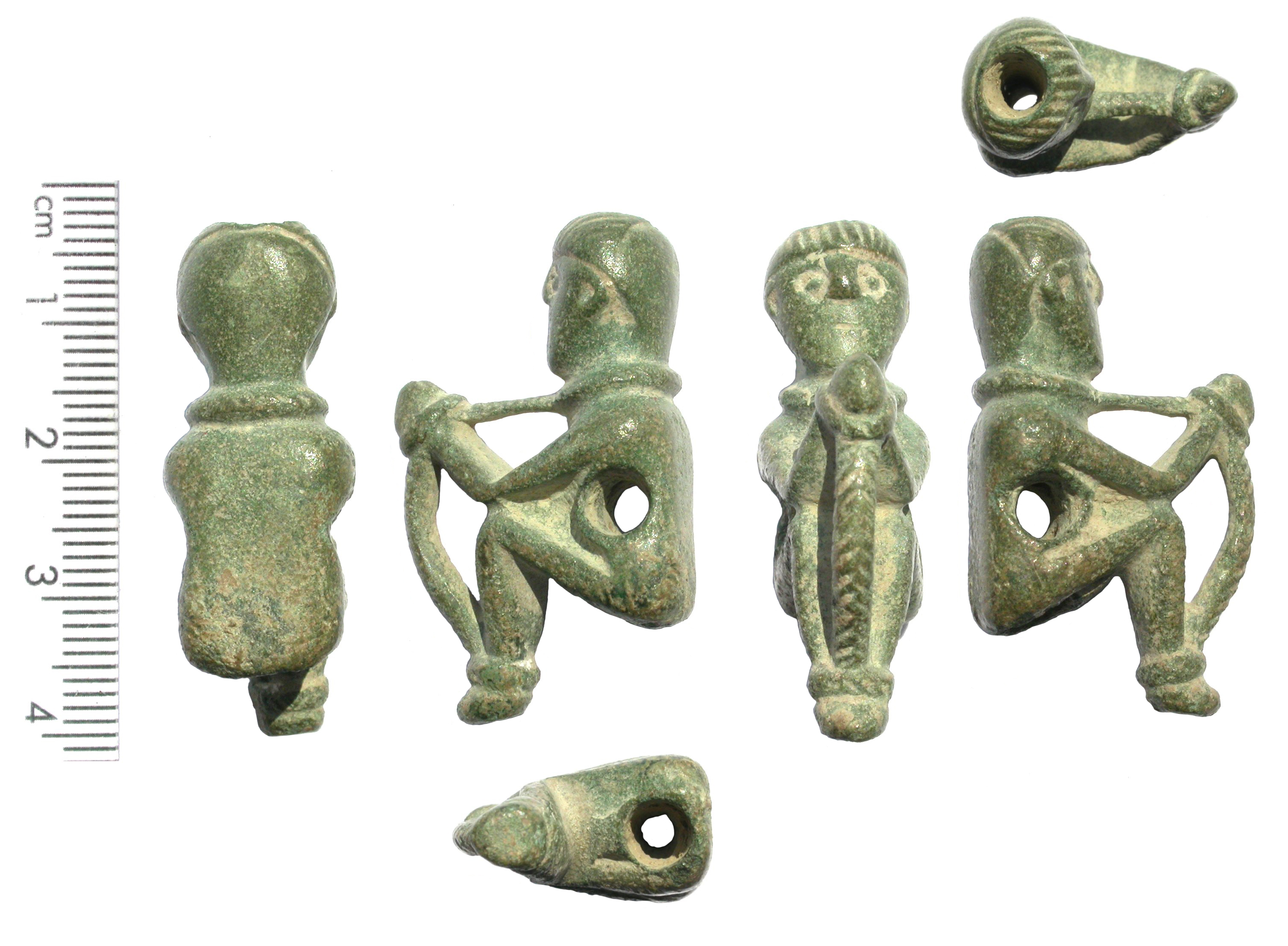
An example of small perforated copper-alloy figurines (2nd–3rd century AD) depicting captives, found scattered widely in Britain and along the Rhine-Danube Roman frontier. They are thought to be connected to slave-trading, but their possible use or significance remains a mystery. (Portable Antiquities Scheme)

Roman coin hoards dating from the 60s BC are found in unusual abundance in Dacia (present-day Romania), and have been interpreted as evidence that Pompey's success in shutting down piracy caused an increase in the slave trade in the lower Danube basin to meet demand. The hoards drop off in frequency for the 50s BC, when Julius Caesar's campaigns in Gaul were resulting in large lots of new slaves brought to market, and resurge in the 40s and 30s. Archaeology into the 21st century has continued to produce evidence of slave trafficking in parts of the Empire where it had been little attested, such as Roman London.

Slaves were traded from outside Roman borders at several points, as mentioned by literary sources such as Strabo and Tacitus and attested by epigraphical evidence in which slaves are listed among commodities subject to tariffs. The readiness of Thracians to exchange slaves for the necessary commodity of salt became proverbial among the Greeks. Diodorus Siculus says that in pre-conquest Gaul, wine merchants could trade an amphora for a slave; Cicero mentions a slave trader from Gaul in 83 BC. The trans-Saharan slave trade along the ancient Garamantian caravan route would have brought slaves to Rome along with other goods and raw materials, but slaves from sub-Saharan Africa appear to have been viewed as an exotic luxury and were relatively few in number. Walter Scheidel conjectured that "enslavables" were traded across borders from present-day Ireland, Scotland, eastern Germany, southern Russia, the Caucasus, the Arab peninsula, and what used to be referred to as "the Sudan"; the Parthian Empire would have consumed most supply to the east.

==== Auctions and sales ====
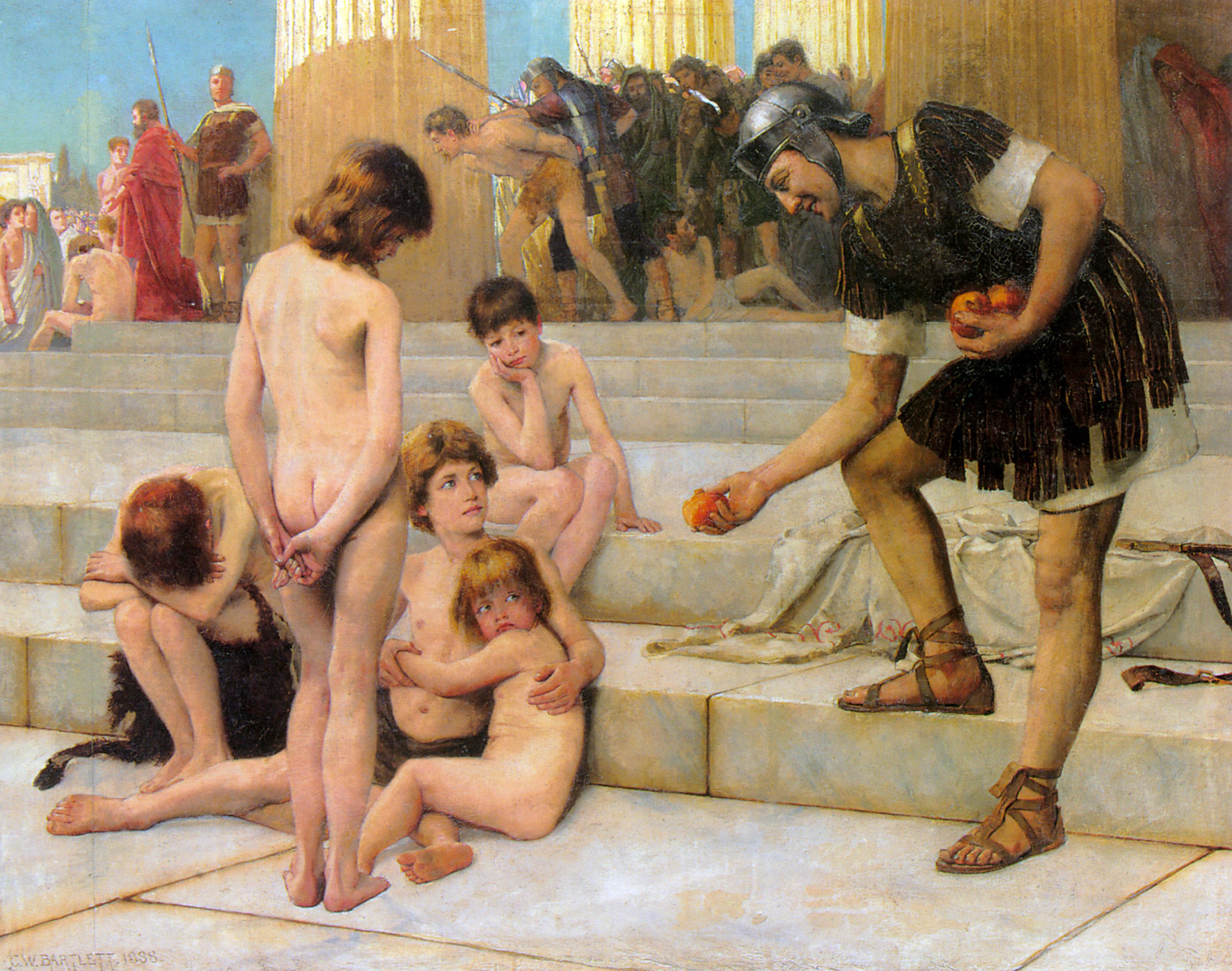
Captives in Rome, a nineteenth-century painting by Charles W. Bartlett

William V. Harris outlines four market venues for slave trading:

- small-scale transactions owner-to-owner in which a single slave might be traded;
- the "opportunistic market", such as the slave traders who followed the army and handled large numbers of slaves;
- fairs and markets in small towns, where slaves would've been among various goods exchanged;
- slave markets in major cities, where auctions were held on a regular basis.

Slaves traded on the market were empticii ("purchased ones"), as distinguished from home-reared slaves born within the familia. Empticii were most often bought cheap for everyday tasks or labor, but some were thought of as a kind of luxury good and brought high prices, if they possessed a sought-after, specialized skill or a special quality such as beauty. Most of the slaves traded on the market were in their teens and twenties. In Diocletian's edict on price controls (301 AD), a maximum price for skilled slaves aged 16–40 is fixed as up to double that of an unskilled slave, which was the equivalent of 3 tons of wheat for a male and 2.5 for a female. Actual pricing would differ by time and place. Evidence for real prices is rare and known mostly from papyri documents preserved in Roman Egypt, where the practice of slavery may not be typical of Italy or the empire as a whole.

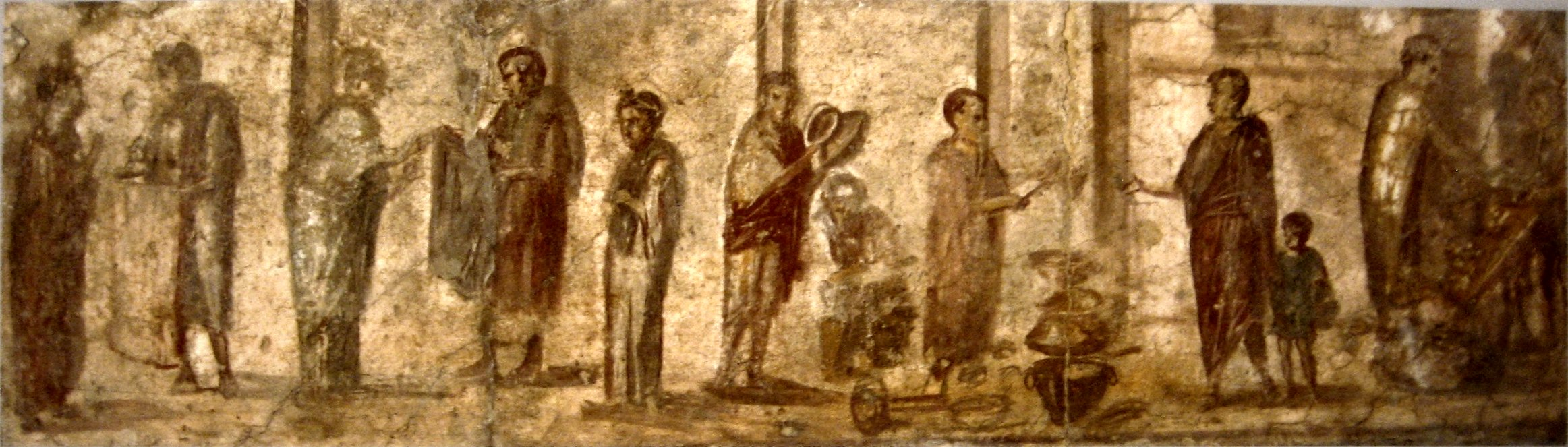
A wall painting from the House of Julia Felix depicts the market in the forum at Pompeii, where trade included slaves.

From the mid-1st century BC, the edict of the aediles, who had jurisdiction over market transactions, had a section aimed at protecting buyers of slaves by requiring any disease or defect to be divulged at time of sale. Information about the slave was either written on a tablet (titulus) hung from the neck or called out by the auctioneer. The slave being auctioned might be placed on a stand for viewing. (Note: The stand has sometimes been described as revolving, based on a mention in the poetry of Statius (1st century AD).) Prospective buyers could feel the slave, have them move or jump, or ask for them to be undressed to make sure the dealer wasn't concealing a physical defect. The wearing of a particular cap (pilleus) marked a slave who didn't come with a warranty; chalk-whitened feet were a sign of foreigners newly arrived in Italy.

A rare depiction of an auction, on a funeral monument from about the same time as the edict, shows a male slave wearing a loincloth and possibly shackles and standing on a pedestal- or podium-like structure. To the left is an auctioneer (praeco); the gesturing, toga-wearing figure to the right may be a buyer asking questions. The monument was set up by a familia of former slaves, the Publilii, who were either depicting their own history or, like many freedmen, expressing pride in conducting their own business successfully and honestly.

If defects were fraudulently concealed, a six-month return policy required the dealer to take back the slave and issue a refund, or to make a partial refund during an extended warranty of twelve months. Roman jurists closely parsed what might constitute a defect—not, for instance, missing teeth, since perfectly healthy infants, it was reasoned, lack teeth. Slaves who were sold for a single price as a functional unit, such as a theater troupe, could be returned as a group if one proved to be defective.

Although slaves were property (res), as human beings they were not to be considered merchandise (merces); those who sold them therefore were not merchants or traders (mercatores) but sellers (venalicarii).

==== Slave-traders ====
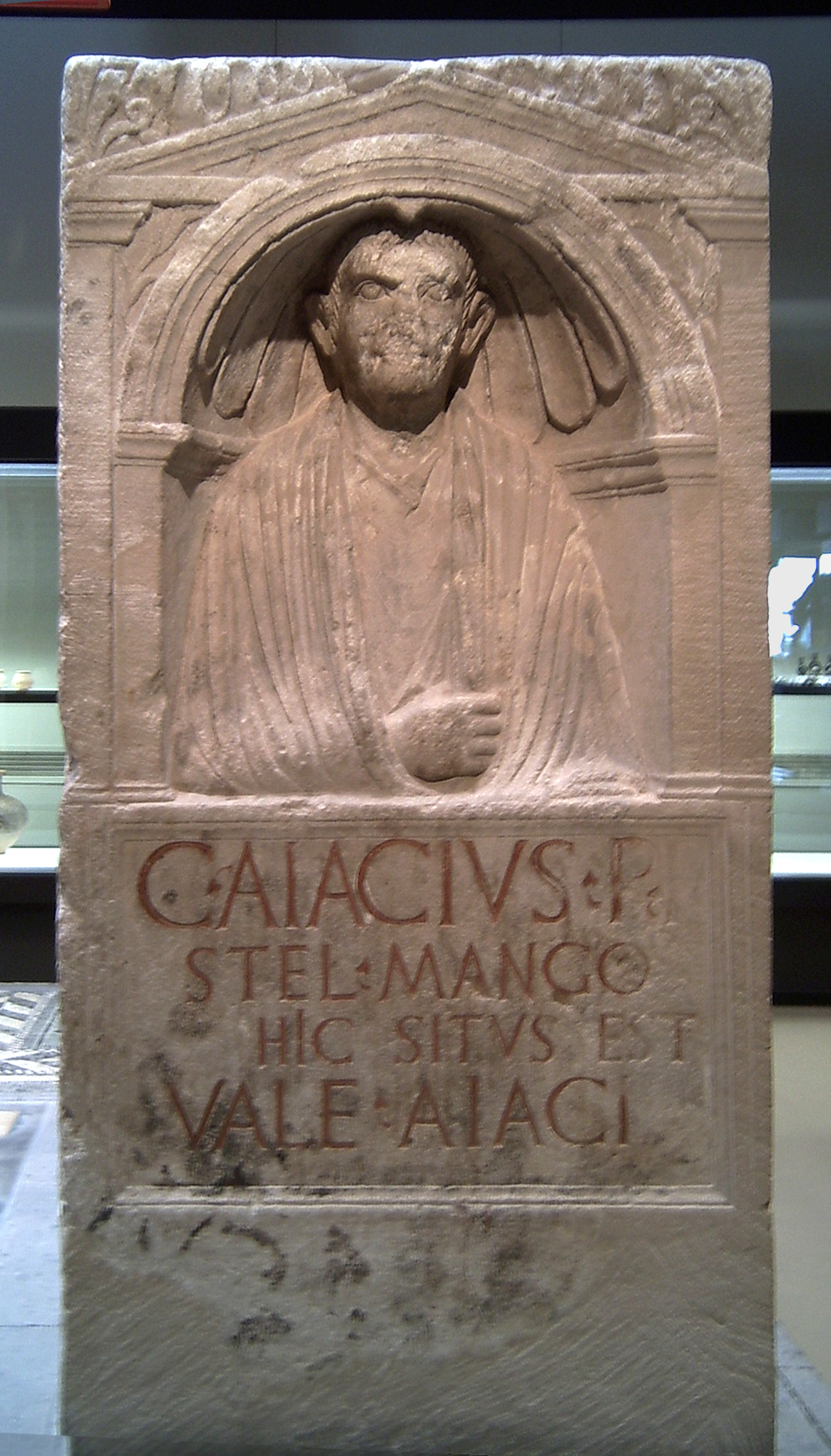
Funerary monument of Gaius Aiacius, a slave-trader (mango) at the Römisch-Germanisches Museum in Cologne (CIL 13.8348; 30–40 BC)

The Latin word for slave-trader was venalicius or venalicarius (from venalis, "something that can be bought", especially as a substantive, a human being for sale) or mango, plural mangones, a word of likely Greek origin that had connotations of "huckster"; in Greek more bluntly somatemporos, a dealer in bodies. Slave-traders had a reputation for dishonesty and deceptive practices, but most of the moral judgments are about defrauding customers rather than the welfare of the slaves. While the senatorial class disdained commerce in general as sordid, rhetoric reviling slave-traders in particular is found widely in Latin literature. Although slaves play leading roles in the comedies of Plautus, no major character is a slave-trader.

Professional slave-traders are rather shadowy figures, as their social standing and identities are not well documented in ancient sources. They appear to have formed trade organizations (societates) that lobbied for legislation and perhaps also for the purpose of raising investment capital. Most of those known by name are Roman citizens; of these, most are freedmen. Only a few slave-traders receive prominent mention by name in literature; one Toranius Flaccus was considered a witty dinner companion and socialized with the future emperor Augustus. Mark Antony relied on Toranius as a procurer of female slaves, and even forgave him upon learning that the supposedly twin boys he had purchased were in fact not consanguineous, the mango having persuaded the triumvir that their identical appearance was therefore all the more remarkable.

A few slave-traders were comfortable enough with their occupation that they had themselves identified as such in their epitaphs. Others are known from inscriptions recognizing them as benefactors, indicating that they were prosperous and locally prominent. The Genius venalicii, an obscure guardian spirit to do with the slave market, is honored presumably by slave-traders in four inscriptions, one of which is dedicated to this genius in the company of Dea Syria, perhaps reflecting the heavy trade in Syrian slaves from which arose a Syrian neighborhood in the city of Rome. The cultivation of various genii was an everyday feature of classical Roman religion; the Genius venalicii normalizes the trade in slaves as like any other prosperity-seeking marketplace.

Slaves were also sold widely by people who made their main living in other ways and by merchants dealing primarily in other goods. In late antiquity, itinerant Galatians protected by powerful patrons become prominent in the North African trade. Although elite owners generally acquired slaves through intermediaries, some may have been more directly involved than literary sources like to acknowledge. When the future emperor Vespasian returned bankrupt from his proconsulate in Africa, he is thought to have restored his fortunes by trading in slaves, possibly specializing in eunuchs as a luxury good.

==== Taxes and tariffs ====
During the Republic, the only regular revenue from slaveholding collected by the state was a tax placed on manumissions starting in 357 BC, amounting to 5 percent of the slave's estimated value. In 183 BC, Cato the Elder as censor placed a sumptuary tax on slaves that had cost 10,000 asses or more, calculated at a rate of 3 denarii per 1,000 asses (with the denarius at the time equaling 16 asses) on an assessed value ten times the purchase price In 40 BC, the triumvirs attempted to impose a tax on slave ownership, which was squelched by "bitter opposition".

In AD 7, Augustus imposed the first tax on Roman citizens as purchasers of slaves at a rate of 2 percent, estimated to generate annual revenues of about 5 million sesterces—a figure that may indicate some 250,000 sales. By comparison, the sales tax on slaves in Ptolemaic Egypt had been 20 percent The slave-sales tax was increased under Nero to 4 percent, with a misguided attempt to divert the burden to the seller, which only increased prices

Tariffs on slaves imported to or exported from Italy were taken at harbor customs, as they were all around the Empire In AD 137, for example, the customs dues in Palmyra for teenage slaves was 2 to 3 percent of value. At Zaraï in Roman Numidia, the tariff for a slave was the same as for a horse or mule. A law of the censors exempted the paterfamilias from paying harbor tax at Sicily on servi brought into Italy for his direct employment in a wide range of roles, indicating that the Romans saw a difference between obtaining slaves who were to be incorporated into the life of the household and those traded for profit.

=== Types of work ===
Slaves worked in a wide range of occupations that can be roughly divided into five categories: household or domestic service, urban crafts and services, agriculture, imperial or public service, and manual labor such as mining. Both free and enslaved labor was employed for nearly all forms of work, though the proportion of free workers to slaves might vary by task and at different time periods. Legal texts state that slaves' skills were to be protected from misuse; examples given include not using a stage actor as a bath attendant, not forcing a professional athlete to clean latrines, and not sending a librarius (scribe or manuscript copyist) to the countryside to carry baskets of lime. Regardless of the status of the worker, labor in the service of another was regarded as a form of submission in the ancient world, and Romans of the governing class regarded wage-earning as equivalent to slavery.

==== Household slaves ====
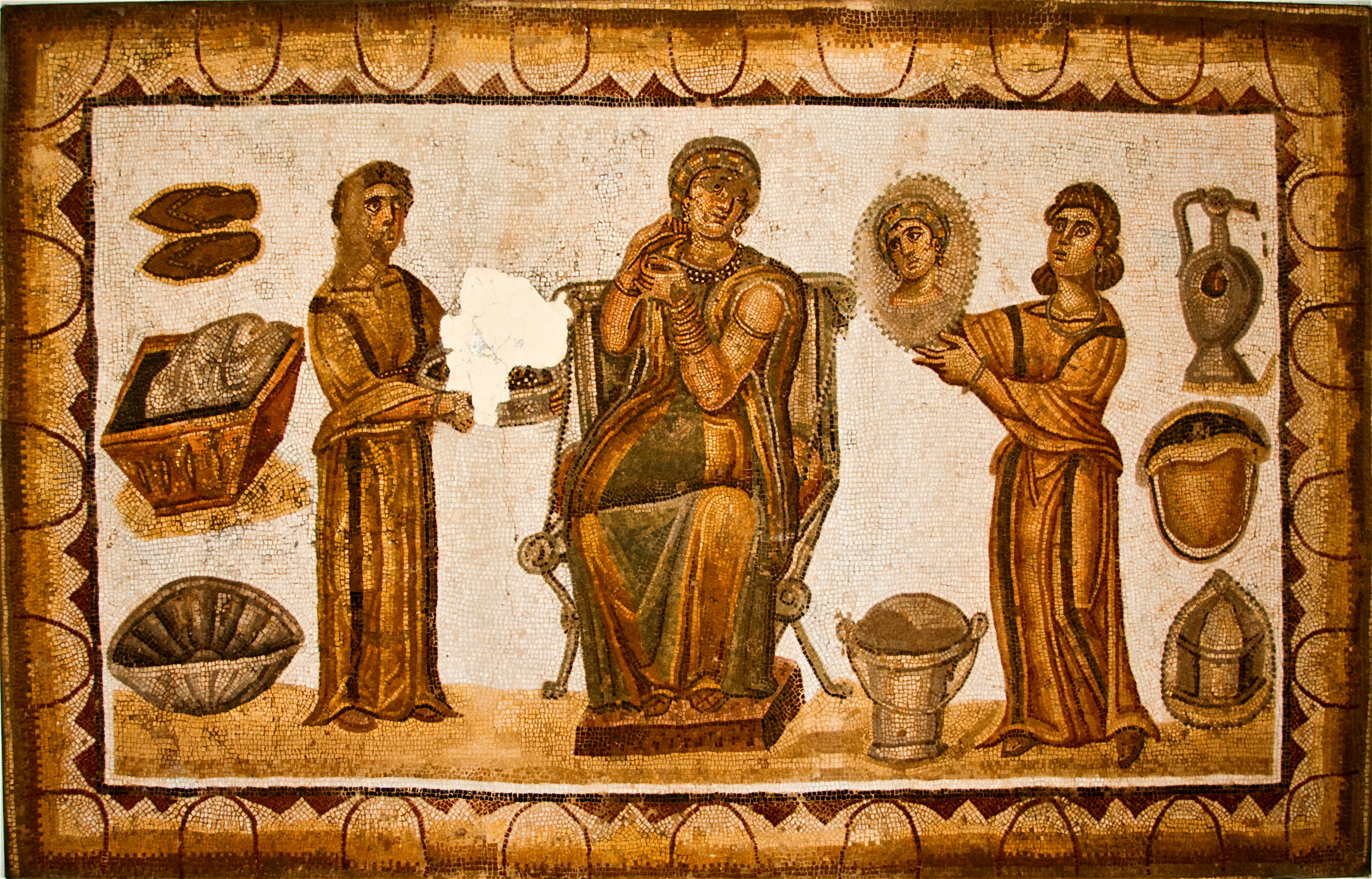
Mosaic from a Roman villa at Sidi Ghrib (in present-day Tunisia) depicting two female slaves (ancillae) attending their mistress

Epitaphs record at least 55 different jobs a household slave might have, including barber, butler, cook, hairdresser, handmaid (ancilla), launderer, wet nurse or nursery attendant, teacher, secretary, seamstress, accountant, and physician. For large households, job descriptions indicate a high degree of specialization: handmaids might be assigned to the upkeep, storage, and readiness of the mistress's wardrobe or specifically mirrors or jewelry. Rich households with specialists who might not be needed full-time year round, such as goldsmiths or furniture painters, might lease them out to friends and desirable associates or give them license to run their own shop as part of their peculium. A "poor" household was one in which the same few slaves did everything without specialization.

In Roman Egypt, papyri preserve apprenticeship contracts written in Greek that indicate the training a worker might require to become skilled, usually for a full year. A beautician (ornatrix) required a three-year apprenticeship; in one Roman legal case, it was ruled that a slave who had studied for only two months could not be considered an ornatrix as a matter of law.

In the Imperial era, a large elite household (a domus in town, or a villa in the countryside) might be supported by a staff of hundreds; or on the lower end of scholarly estimates, perhaps an average of 100 slaves per domus during the time of Augustus. Possibly half the slaves in the city of Rome served in the houses of the senatorial order and of the richer equestrians. The living conditions of the familia urbana—slaves attached to a domus—were sometimes superior to those of many free urban poor in Rome, though even in the grandest houses, they would have lived "packed in to basement rooms and odd crannies". Still, household slaves likely enjoyed the highest standard of living among Roman slaves, next to publicly owned slaves in administration, who were not subject to the whims of a single master.

==== Urban crafts and services ====
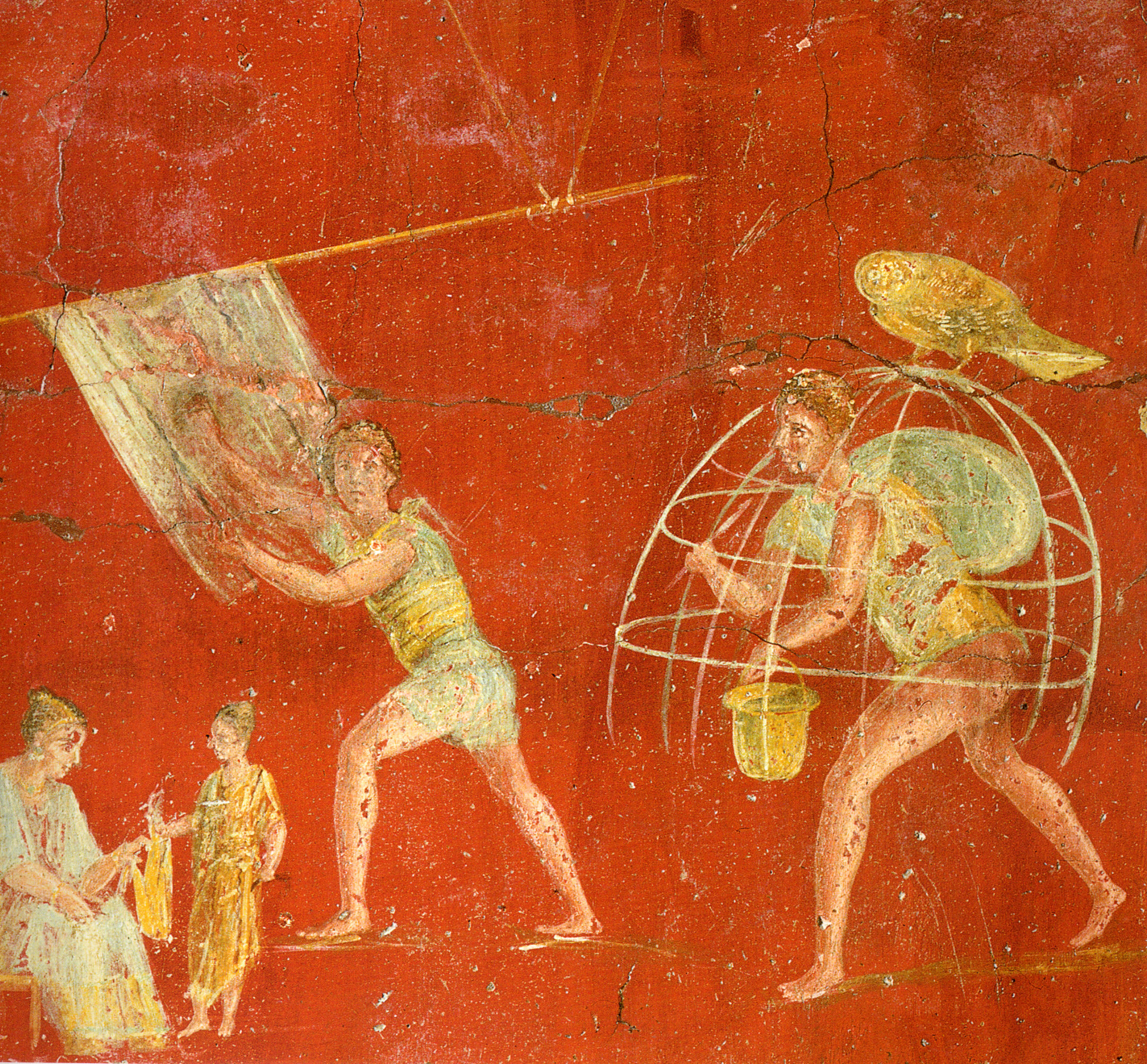
Fullers at work in a wall painting from Pompeii; free and enslaved people often cannot be distinguished in depictions of labor

Of slaves in the city of Rome not attached to a domus, most were engaged in trades and manufacturing. Occupations included fullers, engravers, shoemakers, bakers, and mule drivers. The Roman domus itself should not be thought of as a "private" home in the modern sense, as business was often conducted there, and even commerce—the first-floor rooms facing the street might be shops used or rented out as commercial spaces. The work done or the goods made and sold by enslaved labor from these storefronts complicates the distinction between household and general urban labor.

Through the end of the 2nd century BC, skilled labor throughout Italy, such as pottery design and manufacture, was still predominated by free workers, whose corporations or guilds (collegia) might own a few slaves. In the Imperial era, as many as 90 percent of workers in these areas might be slaves or former slaves.

Training programs and apprenticeships are well if briefly documented. Slaves whose ability was noticed might be trained from a young age in trades requiring a high degree of artistry or expertise; for example, an epitaph mourns the premature death of a talented boy, only age 12, who was already apprenticing as a goldsmith. Girls might be apprenticed particularly in the textile industry; contracts specify apprenticeships of varying durations. One four-year contract from Roman Egypt that apprentices an underage girl to a master weaver shows how detailed terms could be. The owner is to feed and clothe the girl, who is to receive periodic pay raises from the weaver as her skills level up, along with eighteen holidays a year. Sick days are to be tacked onto her term of service, and the weaver is responsible for taxes. The contractual aspect of benefits and obligations seems "distinctly modern" and indicates that a slave on a skills track might have opportunities, bargaining power, and relative social security nearly on a par with or exceeding free but low-skill workers living at a subsistence level. The widely attested success of freedmen might have been one possible motivation for contractual self-sale, as a well-connected owner might be able to obtain training for the slave and market access later as a patron to the new freedman.

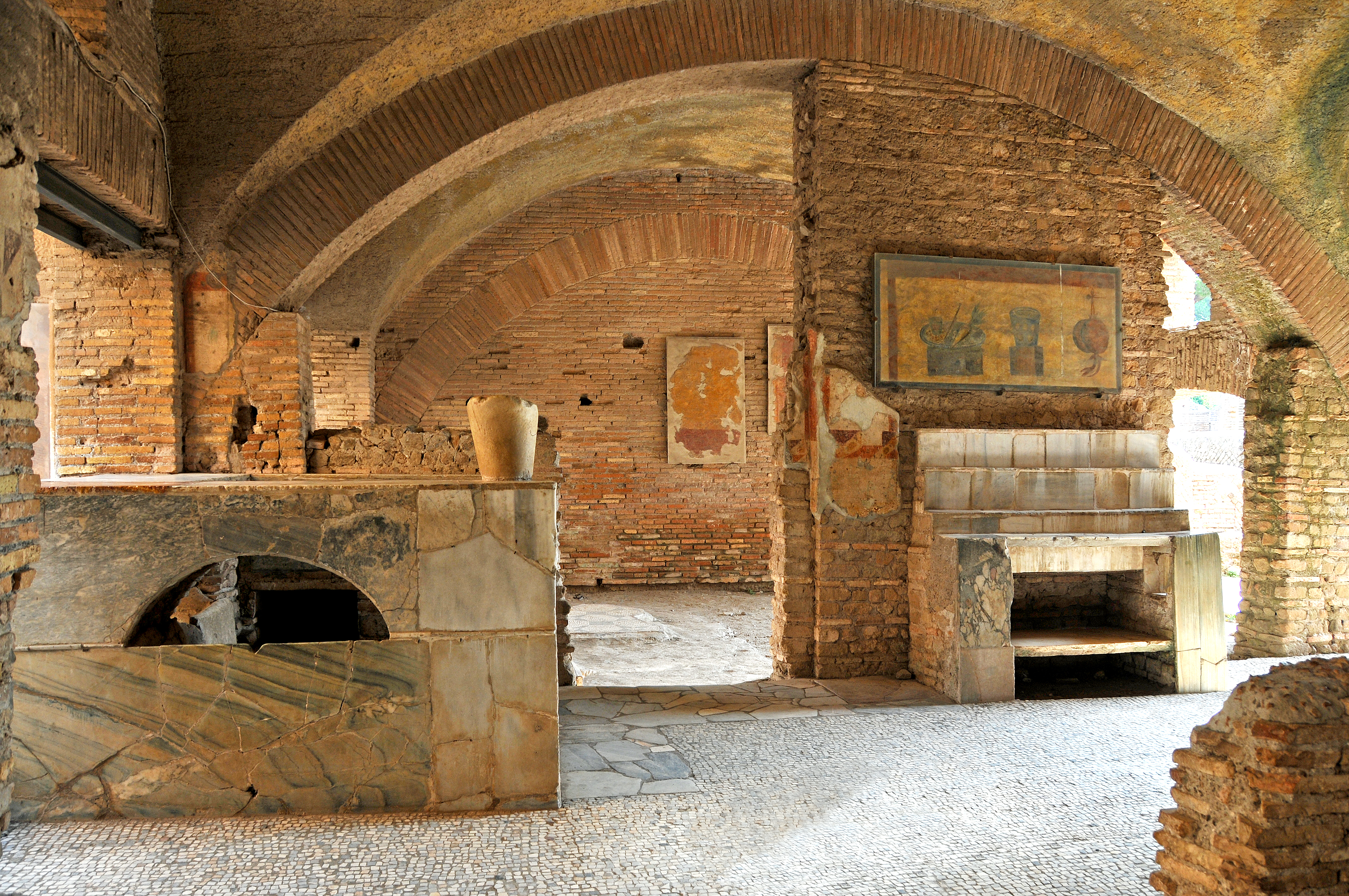
An ancient Roman restaurant (thermopolium) near the forum in Ostia Antica: all aspects of food preparation and service employed both free and slave labor

In the city of Rome, working people and their slaves lived in insulae, multistory buildings with shops on the ground floor and apartments above. Most apartments in Rome lacked proper kitchens and might have only a charcoal brazier. Food therefore was widely prepared and sold by free and slave labor at pubs and bars, inns, and food stalls (tabernae, cauponae, popinae, thermopolia). But carryout and dining-in establishments were for the lower classes; fine dining was offered in wealthy homes with an enslaved kitchen staff comprising a head chef (archimagirus), sous chef (vicarius supra cocos), and assistants (coci). Columella decries the extravagance of culinary workshops that produce chefs and professional servers when schools for agriculture don't exist. Seneca mentions the specialized training required for poultry-carving, and the habitually indignant Juvenal rails about a carver (cultellus) who rehearses dance-like moves and knife-wielding to meet the exacting standards of his teacher.

In the Roman world, architects were usually freeborn men for hire or freedmen, but the names of some high-profile enslaved architects are known, including Corumbus, the slave of Caesar's friend Balbus, and Tychicus, whom the emperor Domitian owned.

==== Agriculture ====
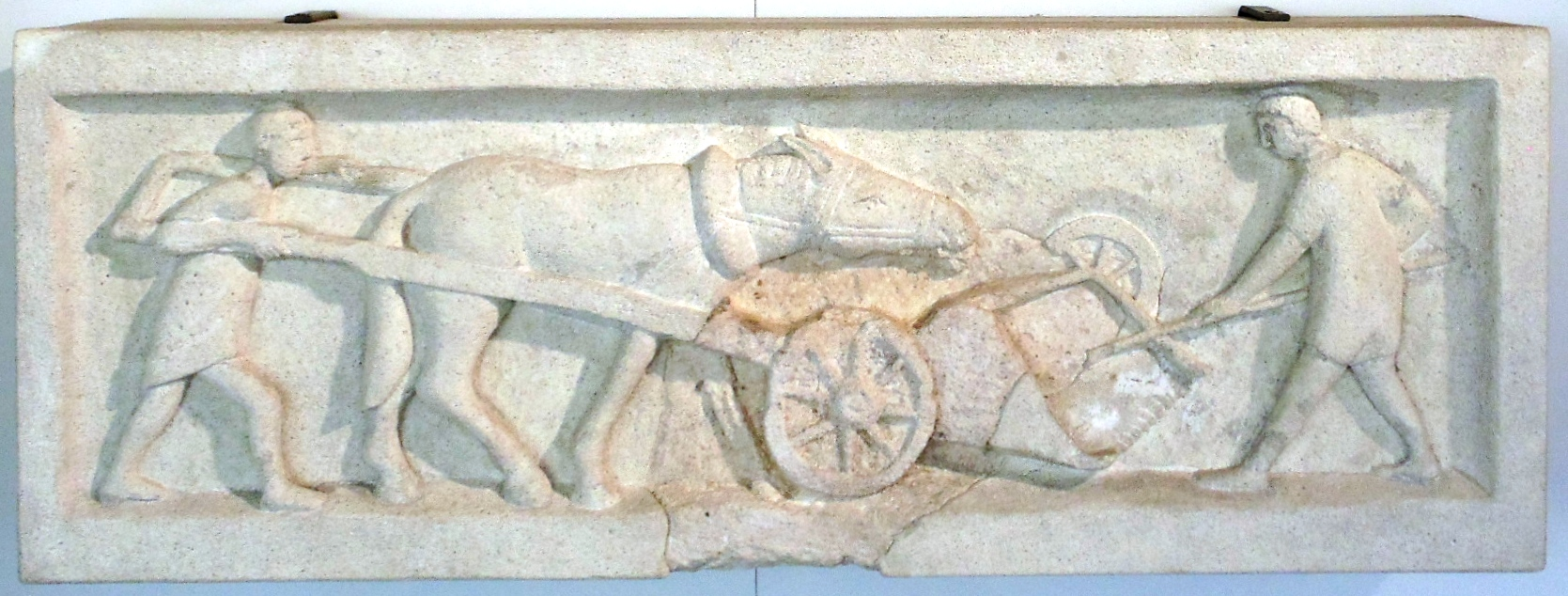
Agricultural workers using a reaper on a relief from Roman Gaul

Farm slaves (familia rustica) may have lived in more healthful conditions than their urban counterparts in trade and manufacturing. Roman agricultural writers expect that the workforce of a farm will be mostly slaves, who are regarded as speaking versions of the animals they tend. Cato advises farm owners to dispose of old and sickly slaves just as they would worn-out oxen, and Columella finds it convenient to house slaves next to the cattle or sheep they tend. Roman law was explicit that farm slaves were to be equated with quadrupeds kept in herds. They were far less likely to be manumitted than either skilled urban or household slaves.

Large farms employing slaves for planting and harvesting are found in the eastern empire as well as Europe, and are alluded to in the Christian Gospels.

The ratio of male slaves to female on a farm was likely to be even more disproportionate than in a household (perhaps as high as 80 percent). The relatively few women would spin and weave wool, make clothes, and work in the kitchen. The slaves on a farm were managed by a vilicus, who was often a slave himself. Male slaves who had proven their loyalty and ability to manage others might be allowed to form a long-term relationship with a female fellow slave (conserva) and have children. It was especially desirable for the vilicus to have a quasi marriage (contubernium). The vilica who supervised food preparation and textile production for the estate held her position on her own merit and only infrequently was the woman who lived with the vilicus as his wife.

From the Middle Republic on, unmanageable slaves might be punished by confinement to an ergastulum, a work barracks for those subjected to chaining; Columella says every farm needs one. (Note: In "The Later Roman Colonate and Freedom", Miroslava Mirković notes that, in other contexts, the ergastulum seems to be a penal workhouse not necessarily for agricultural labor, as when Livy (2.2.6) contrasts a debtor who is led non in servitium sed in ergastulum, "not into slavery but into the workhouse".)

==== Hard labor ====
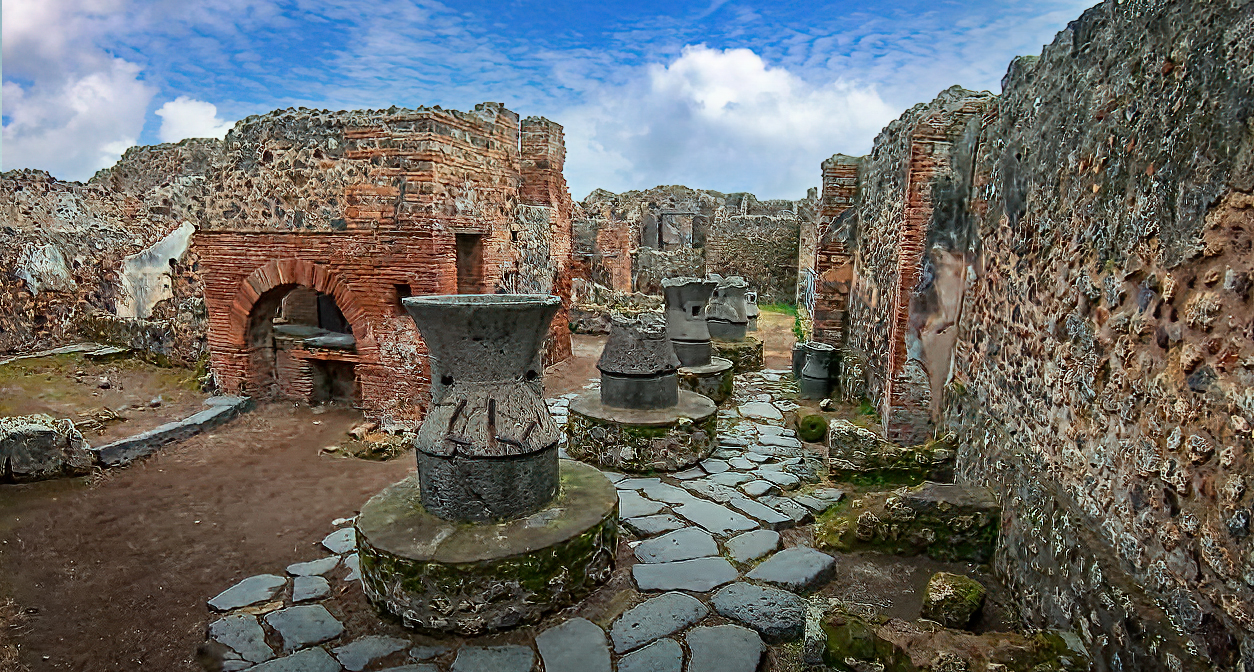
Remains of a mill and bakery complex in Pompeii

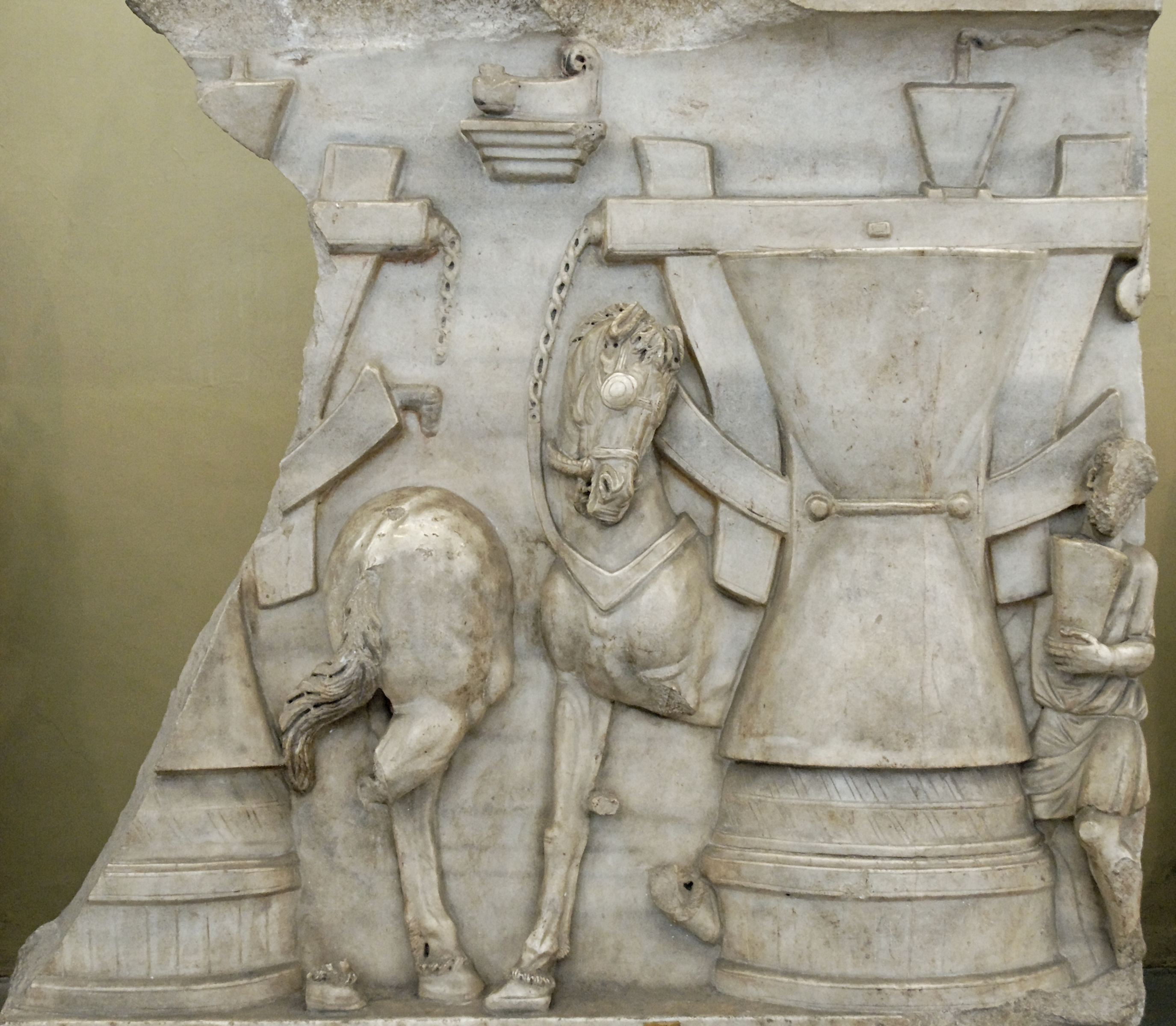
A slave (far right) working a mill alongside chained horses, fragment of a sarcophagus relief

In the Republican era, a punishment that slaves feared was hard labor in chains at mill and bakery operations (pistrina) or work farms (ergastula). In an early example of condemnation to hard labor, enslaved captives from the war with Hannibal were chained and sent to work in a quarry after they rebelled in 198 BC.

Prison sentences for citizens were not a part of the Roman criminal justice system; jails were meant for holding prisoners transitionally. Instead, in the Imperial era the convicted would be sentenced to hard labor and sent to camps where they would be put to work in the mines and quarries or the mills. Damnati in metallum ("those condemned to the mine", or metallici) lost their freedom as citizens (libertas), forfeited their property (bona) to the state, and became servi poenae, slaves as a legal penalty. Their status under the law differed from that of other slaves; they could not buy their freedom, be sold, or be set free. They were expected to live and often die in the mines. In the later Empire, the permanence of their status was indicated by a tattooing of the forehead.

Convicts numbering in the tens of thousands were condemned to the notoriously brutal conditions of enslavement in the mines and quarries. Christians felt that their community was particularly subject to this penalty. The condemnation of free inhabitants of the Empire to conditions of slavery was among the punishments that degraded the citizenship status of the lower classes—the humiliores who had not held office at the level of decurion or higher and were most of the populace—in ways that would have been intolerable during the Republic. Slaves could also end up in the mines as punishment, and even in the mines were subject to harsher discipline than the formerly free convicts. Women could be sentenced to lighter work at the mines. Some provinces did not have mines, so those condemned as metallici might have to be transported great distances to serve their sentence.

Convict labor played a role in public works in the municipalities; the quarrying of building stone and fine stone such as alabaster and porphyry; the mining of metals and minerals (such as lime, which was used in Roman concrete, and sulphur), and perhaps in salt works. In the 3rd and 4th centuries, convicts began to be sentenced to pistrina in Rome, a punishment formerly reserved for slaves, and to the new state-owned factories that made clothing for the military and imperial household. The Imperial novelty of sentencing free people to hard labor may have compensated for a declining supply of war captives to enslave, though ancient sources don't discuss the economic impact as such, which was secondary to demonstrating the "coercive capacities of the state"—the cruelty was the point. (Note: Eusebius, writing of those who were subjected to mutilations that reduced their capacity to work and were then sent to the copper mines "not so much for service as for the sake of ill treatment and hardship" (Historia Ecclesiastica 8.12.10).)

Not all mining labor was unfree, as indicated for example by an employment contract dating to AD 164. The employee agrees to provide "healthy and vigorous labor" at a gold mine for wages of 70 denarii and a term of service from May to November; if he chooses to quit before that time, 5 sesterces for each day not worked will be deducted from the total. There is no evidence that convict labor was used in the major mining district in Lusitania, the Imperial gold mines in Dacia, or Imperial quarries in Phrygia; these would have employed the usual combination of free and slave labor. Mine administration and management was often handled by imperial slaves and freedmen of the familia Caesaris.

Contrary to modern popular imagery, the Roman navy did not employ galley slaves except in wartime when there was a shortage of free oarsman. While it is likely that merchants regularly used enslaved oarsmen for shipping, the practice is not well attested.

==== Public and imperial slaves ====
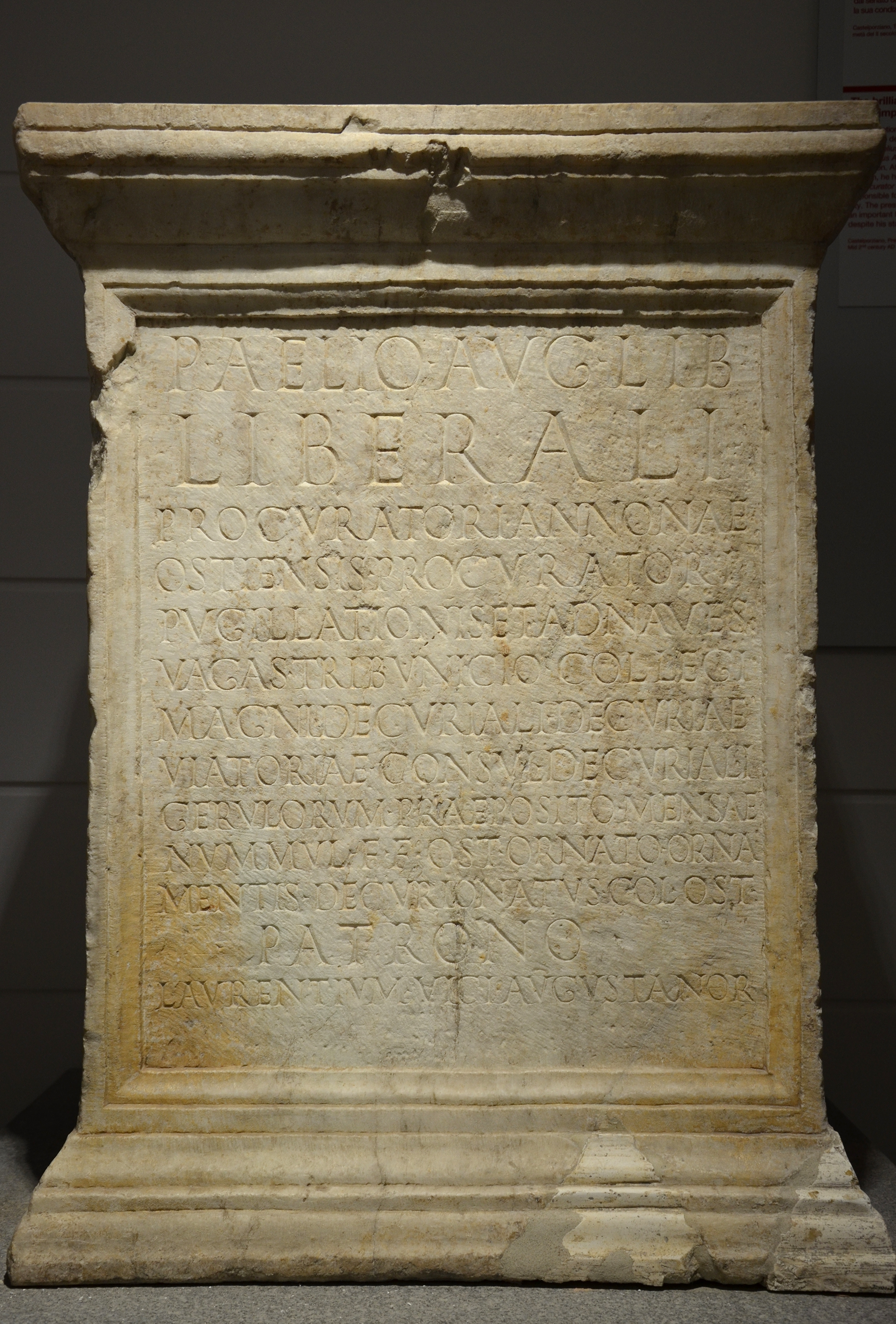
Inscription from the base of a statue honoring the imperial freedman Publius Aelius Liberalis as the patron of the vicus Augustanus in Ostia, where he held several governmental positions up to that of procurator of the grain supply (annona)

A servus publicus populi Romani was a slave owned not by a private individual, but by the Roman people. Public slaves at Rome worked in temples and other public buildings and were attached especially to the public treasury (aerarium). Most performed general, basic tasks as servants to the College of Pontiffs, magistrates, and other officials. They were often employed as messengers. They might be assigned to revenue collection, archives, waterworks, firefighting, and other public works. Less savory tasks also fell to public slaves, such as carrying out executions. Some well-qualified public slaves did skilled office work such as accounting and secretarial services: "the greater part of the business of Rome seems to have been conducted through slaves." Often entrusted with managerial roles, they were permitted to earn money for their own use, and they were paid a yearly stipend from the treasury.

Because they had an opportunity to prove their merit, public slaves could acquire a reputation and influence, and their chances for manumission were higher. During the Republic, a public slave could be freed by a magistrate's declaration, with the prior authorization of the senate; in the Imperial era, liberty would be granted by the emperor. A public slave acquired his own position and it was not passed down to a son. Public slaves held testamentary rights that even informally manumitted freedmen were not permitted: a servus publicus could write a will and bequeath up to half his estate, and could also receive bequests.

Since women did not serve in the government, women were not themselves public slaves in the privileged sense of a servus publicus, though they could be in the possession of the state temporarily as captives or confiscated property, and as the quasi-marital partner of a public slave would share some of his privileges.

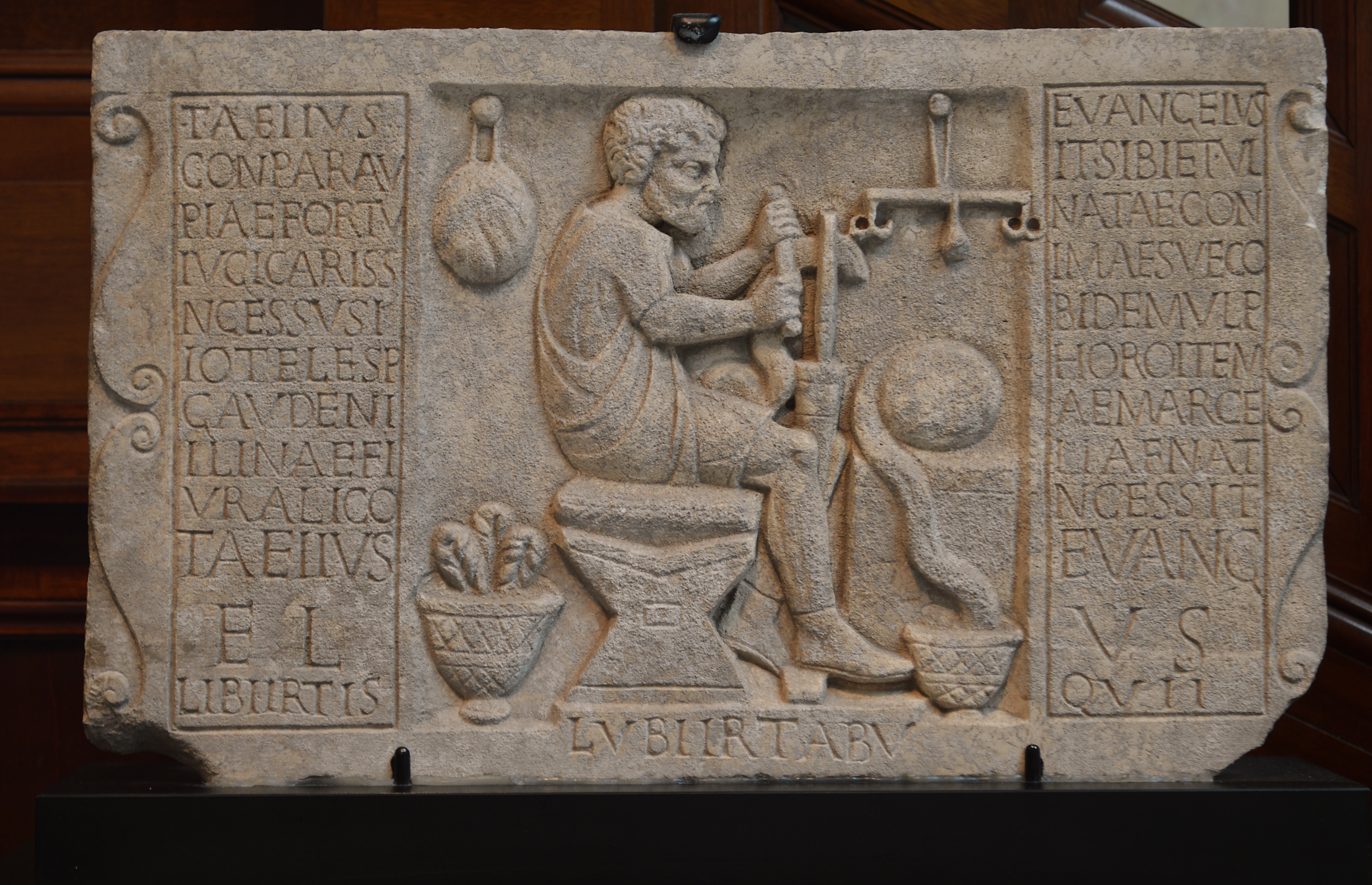
Gravesite marker (2nd century AD) for the wool merchant Titus Aelius Evangelus, likely a freedman of Antoninus Pius, along with his wife, Ulpia Fortunata; Ulpius Telesphorus, of likely Trajanic freedman lineage and a relative of the wife or a conlibertus; Gaudenia Marcellina, the natural daughter of Evangelus from a previous union; and their freedpersons and descendants

The term "imperial slave" is broader and includes not only slaves owned by the emperor and serving in the imperial bureaucracy but also more generally the familia Caesaris, the slaves employed in the emperor's household, including those on his wife's staff. Women were therefore part of the familia Caesaris. Public and imperial slaves were among those most likely to have a contubernium, an informally recognized union that could become a legal marriage if both parties were manumitted.

Because public slaves primarily assisted the senatorial functions of government, the institution waned in the Imperial era as the emperor's own slaves assumed their administrative roles. Vast numbers of imperial slaves helped drive the large-scale public works of the Roman Empire; for example, Frontinus (1st century AD) says that personnel for the city of Rome's aqueducts alone numbered 700.

Municipal slaves were owned by the municipalities and served similar functions as the public slaves of the Roman state. Municipal public slaves could be freed by their municipal council. Imperial and municipal slaves are better documented than most slaves because their higher status prompted them to identify themselves as such in inscriptions.

==== Business managers and agents ====
A slave whose master gave him "free administration" (libera administratio) could travel and act independently on business. One common managerial role was the institor, someone who ran a business that remained fully owned by the principal. The institor (translated loosely as "agent")—who might be the business owner's slave, another person's slave, a freedman, or a freeborn person such as his son—could operate a branch business in the provinces on behalf of a business owner living in Italy, or in Italy on behalf of a provincial owner. Other managerial positions regularly held by slaves were actor, a general term for manager or agent; vilicus, originally the overseer on an agricultural estate but later in an urban setting a general supervisor; and dispensator, a keeper of accounts who handled disbursements in the household and served generally as its steward. Because Roman contract law permitted only direct agency, slaves were placed in these roles for the very reason that they lacked independent personhood and legally could act only as an instrument of their master rather than as a third-party representative. Dispensatores in particular could expect to become wealthy and be manumitted; their wives (Note: Since slaves could not enter into a marriage contract, "wife" usually refers to a contubernalis, a spouse in a sort of common-law marriage or a marriage conducted according to rites not recognized within Roman law. If a dispensator wished to retain the advantages of his position, he might arrange to have his contubernalis manumitted instead of himself so that any children they had would be born as free citizens.) were often free. Although these most lucrative financial positions were held most often by male slaves, inscriptions also record women in the role of dispensatrix.

The owner who set aside money or property as a peculium for the slave to manage in effect created a company with limited liability. But the agency of slaves in conducting business could raise complex legal issues, with hazards for the slave and potential blowback for the master. If a slave was accused of fraud, for example, or a suit was brought in civil court, the master faced a dilemma: he could acknowledge his ownership and defend the slave, making himself liable for paying damages if they lost the case, or he could decline to defend the slave and surrender all claims to ownership and future patronage. The slave was therefore vulnerable to the master's calculations on the relative advantages of defending him or not.

This situation was more than hypothetical; some local laws in the provinces seem aimed at dealing with the legal peculiarities of the relative freedom Romans gave slaves at this operational level. A city in Caria, for example, spelled out that if a Roman slave violated local banking regulations, the owner could either pay a fine or punish the slave; the punishment was specified as fifty blows and six months of prison. If the slave had to testify in cases involving contract law to defend either his master or his own actions, there is no indication that he was exempt from the law that his testimony could be accepted only under torture; the slave therefore had a compelling incentive to meet the most scrupulously high standards in conducting business.

Slaves may even have been routinely preferred to paid free labor in areas of employment such as banking and accounting. At times, an estate might be managed by slaves while free persons provided manual labor. Households that are settings for narratives in the Christian Gospels also show privileged slaves acting as estate managers and agents, collecting rent and produce from tenant farmers, or investing money and conducting business on behalf of their master, as well as serving as oikonomoi (household managers or "economists") in charge of allocating and disbursing food and funds to other members of the familia.

==== Gladiators, entertainers, and prostitutes ====
Gladiators, entertainers such as actors and dancers, and prostitutes were among those persons in Rome who existed in the social limbo of infamia or disrepute, regardless of whether they were enslaved or technically free. Like slaves, they could not bring a case in court nor have someone represent them; like freedmen, they were not eligible to hold public office. In a legal sense, infamia was an official loss of standing for a freeborn person as a result of misconduct, and could be imposed by a censor or praetor as a legal penalty. Those who displayed themselves to entertain others had surrendered the right of citizens not to subject their body to use: "They lived by providing sex, violence, and laughter for the pleasure of the public."

Those deemed infames had few legal protections even if they were Roman citizens who were not subject to being traded as slaves. They were liable to corporal punishment of the kinds usually reserved for slaves. Their daily life probably differed little from that of a slave within the same area of employment, though they had control of their income and more freedom to make decisions about their living arrangements. Their lack of legal standing arose from the kind of work they did—perceived as a morally suspect manipulation of and simultaneous surrender to others' desires for pleasure—not the fact that they worked alongside slaves, since that would be true of nearly all forms of labor in Rome. Lenones (pimps) and lanistae (trainers or managers of gladiators) shared the disreputable status of their workers.

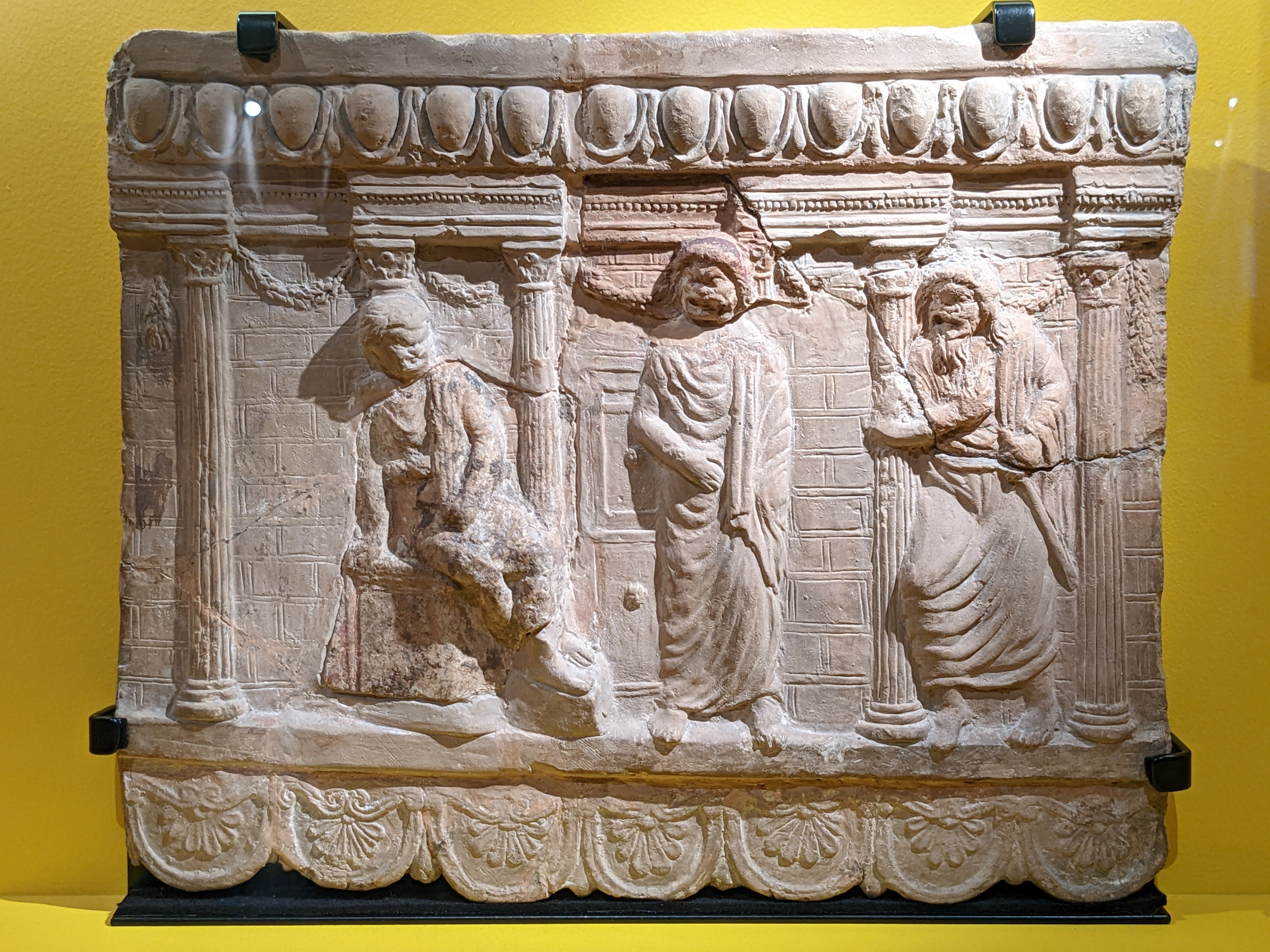
Terra cotta relief (late 1st century BC–early 1st century AD): a slave seeks refuge at an altar to escape his master's punishment in a scene from Roman comedy (Louvre)

Actors were moreover subversive because the theater was a place for free speech. Actors were known to mock politicians from the stage, and there was established law from the 4th century BC and into the late Republic that they could be subjected to physical punishment as slaves were. The comic playwright known in English as Terence was a slave who was manumitted because of his literary abilities.

In the Late Republic, about half the gladiators who fought in Roman arenas were slaves, though the most skilled were often free volunteers. Freeborn gladiators erased the distinction between citizen and slave by taking an oath to subject their bodies to physical abuse, including being branded and beaten, both marks of slavery. Enslaved gladiators who enjoyed success in the arena were occasionally rewarded with manumission but remained in a state of infamia.

Prostitutes in the city of Rome had to be registered with the aediles, and prostitution was legal throughout the Roman Empire in all periods before Christian hegemony. Prostitutes who worked in brothels (lupanaria) were often slaves. By contrast, many streetwalkers were free and self-employed, sometimes choosing that trade out of economic hardship. A few freedwomen who were former prostitutes amassed enough wealth to become public benefactors, but most enslaved brothel workers are likely to have received little or no payment for their own use. Male prostitutes also existed.

Selling a slave against his will to a training camp for gladiators was a punishment. and the emperor Hadrian banned the sale of slaves to pimps or gladiator managers "without cause", indicating that prostitution and violence in the arena were considered beyond the pale of standard servitude. Legislation under Christian emperors likewise forbade masters to employ slaves as stage actors against their will or to prevent actors from retiring from the theater. Sexual slavery was forbidden by the Church, and Christianization was a factor in curtailing or altogether ending traditional spectacles and games (ludi) such as gladiator matches and public theatrical performances.

=== Serfdom ===
By the 3rd century AD, the Roman Empire faced a labor shortage. Large Roman landowners increasingly relied on Roman freemen, acting as tenant farmers, instead of slaves to provide labor. The status of these tenant farmers (coloni) steadily eroded. Because the tax system implemented by Diocletian assessed taxes based on both land and the inhabitants of that land, it became administratively inconvenient for peasants to leave the land where they were counted in the census. In 332 AD Constantine issued legislation that greatly restricted the rights of the coloni and tied them to the land.

As a result, from the 3rd century onward, differentiating a slave, a worker hired under contract, and a peasant tied to the land became at best academic, as socio-legal status devolved into a bifurcation of honestiores and humiliores: the tiny percentage of the populace who had access to power and wealth, having attained honors to the rank of decurion or higher; and those of humbler free status who were increasingly subjected to forms of control reserved for slaves in the Republican era. By the 5th century, the legal status that had distinguished free citizen from slave had all but vanished; what remained was the honestiores who held legally defined privilege, and the humiliores subject to exploitation. Some see these laws as the beginning of medieval serfdom in Europe.

== Demography ==
Demographic studies of antiquity are plagued by incomplete data requiring extrapolation and conjecture. Conclusions should be understood as relative, and scholars who employ demographic models typically issue caveats. For example:

For Italy of the period from the mid-sixties to 30 BC it has been assumed that 100,000 new slaves were needed annually, and that for the empire as a whole from 50 BC to AD 150 in excess of 500,000 new slaves were required each year, on the hypothesis that the slave population was ten million in a total imperial population of 50 million. None of these figures is capable of proof. [italic added]

Estimates for the proportion of slaves in the population of the Roman Empire therefore vary. Since 3/4 of slaves in Italy were born into it the number imported was far lower than the higher estimates according to Walter Scheidel of Stanford University in a paper he wrote: "Human Mobility in Roman Italy, II: The Slave Population" in The Journal of Roman Studies, vol. 95 (2005).

The percentage of Italy's population that was enslaved by the end of the first century BC is estimated at about 20% to 30%, amounting to at least one to two million people. (Note: Jason Paul Wickham, in The Enslavement of War Captives by the Romans to 146 BC, notes the difficulty in estimating the size of the slave population and the supply needed to maintain and grow the population.) One study estimated that for the empire as a whole during the period 260–425 AD, the slave population was just under five million, representing 10–15% of the total population of 50–60 million inhabitants. An estimated 49% of all slaves were owned by the elite, who made up less than 1.5% of the empire's population. About half of all slaves worked in the countryside where they were a small percentage of the population except on some large agricultural, especially imperial, estates; the remainder of the other half were a significant percentage—25% or more—in towns and cities as domestics and workers in commercial enterprises and manufacturers. (Note: No contemporary or systematic census of slave numbers is known; in the Empire, under-reporting of male slave numbers would have reduced the tax liabilities attached to their ownership.)

According to Christer Bruun, the transportation of enslaved people between provinces was "possibly the most common form of migration in the Roman world." This phenomenon is best exemplified by the displacement of the Jewish population of Judaea following waves of mass enslavement during the Jewish–Roman wars.

Slaves (especially foreigners) had higher mortality rates and lower birth rates than natives and were sometimes even subjected to mass expulsions. The average recorded age at death for the slaves of the city of Rome was extraordinarily low: seventeen and a half years (17.2 for males; 17.9 for females). By comparison, average life expectancy at birth for the population as a whole was in the mid-twenties.

Estimated distribution of citizenship in the Roman Empire (middle of the 1st century AD)
Region	Citizens (per cent)	Noncitizen residents (per cent)	Slaves (per cent)
Rome	55	15	30
Italy	70	5	25
Spain and Gaul	10	70	20
Other Western Provinces	3	80	17
Greece and Asia Minor	3	70	27
North African Provinces	2	70	28
Other Eastern Provinces	1	80	19

=== Race and ethnicity ===
Roman slavery was not based on race, (Note: In Africa in Europe: Antiquity into the Age of Global Expansion, Stefan Goodwin explains that "Roman slavery was a nonracist and fluid system.") particularly not race as characterized by skin color, with the caveat that modern definitions of "race" may not align with ancient expressions of the concept. Slaves were drawn from all over Europe and the Mediterranean, including but not limited to Gaul, Hispania, North Africa, Syria, Germany, Britannia, the Balkans, and Greece.

However, Greek and Roman ethnographers did attribute a set of characteristics to peoples based on their understanding, or misunderstanding, of cultural customs that differed from their own, and on where a people lived, believing that climate and environmental factors affected temperament. Place of origin (natio) was one of the pieces of information that had to be disclosed at time of sale. Slaves from certain "nations" were thought to perform better at tasks that might be of value to the prospective buyer. The Roman scholar Varro stated that "in buying human beings as slaves, we pay a higher price for one that is better by nationality." The association of job and natio could be quite specific; Bithynians were touted as litter-bearers. and desired as a status symbol.

Ethnic stereotypes among the Romans included the belief that Asiatic Greeks, Jews, and Syrians were by nature more susceptible to living as slaves. Asia Minor was such an important source of slaves that the typical slave was stereotyped as a Cappadocian or Phrygian. In practice, Jews were "both slaves and slaveholders. They were the slaves of Jews and non-Jews and owned both Jewish and non-Jewish slaves" throughout the Classical period. (Note: A similar conclusion is expressed by Dale B. Martin,) Historian of Christianity Dale Martin has noted, "The relevant factors for slave structures and the existence of slavery itself were geographical and socio-economic and had little if anything to do with ethnicity or religion."

== Quality of life ==
The "gross power differential" inherent in slavery is not peculiar to Rome, but as a universal characteristic of the institution, it defines Roman practice as it does that of other slave cultures: "slaves stood powerless before their masters' or mistresses' whims and presumably remained in a perpetual state of unease, not necessarily able to anticipate when the next act of cruelty or degradation would come yet certain it would." Many—if not most—slaves could expect to be subjected to relentless labor; corporal punishment or physical abuse in varying degrees of severity; sexual exploitation; or the caprices of owners in selling or threatening to sell them. Cato the Elder was a particularly harsh "slave-driver" whose exploitation was "unmitigated by any consideration of the needs of the slave as a human being.

The enslaved who were traded on the open market might find themselves transported great distances across the empire: the epitaph of a slave woman in Roman Spain records her home as having been in Northern Italy; a Cretan woman was traded between two Romans in Dacia; a ten-year-old girl named Abaskantis, taken from Galatia, was sold to a buyer from Alexandria, Egypt, a destination about 1,500 miles from her home. The conditions experienced by the hundreds of thousands traded in Roman antiquity have been described as "personal degradation and humiliation, cultural disorientation, material deprivation, severance of familial bonds, emotional and psychological trauma".

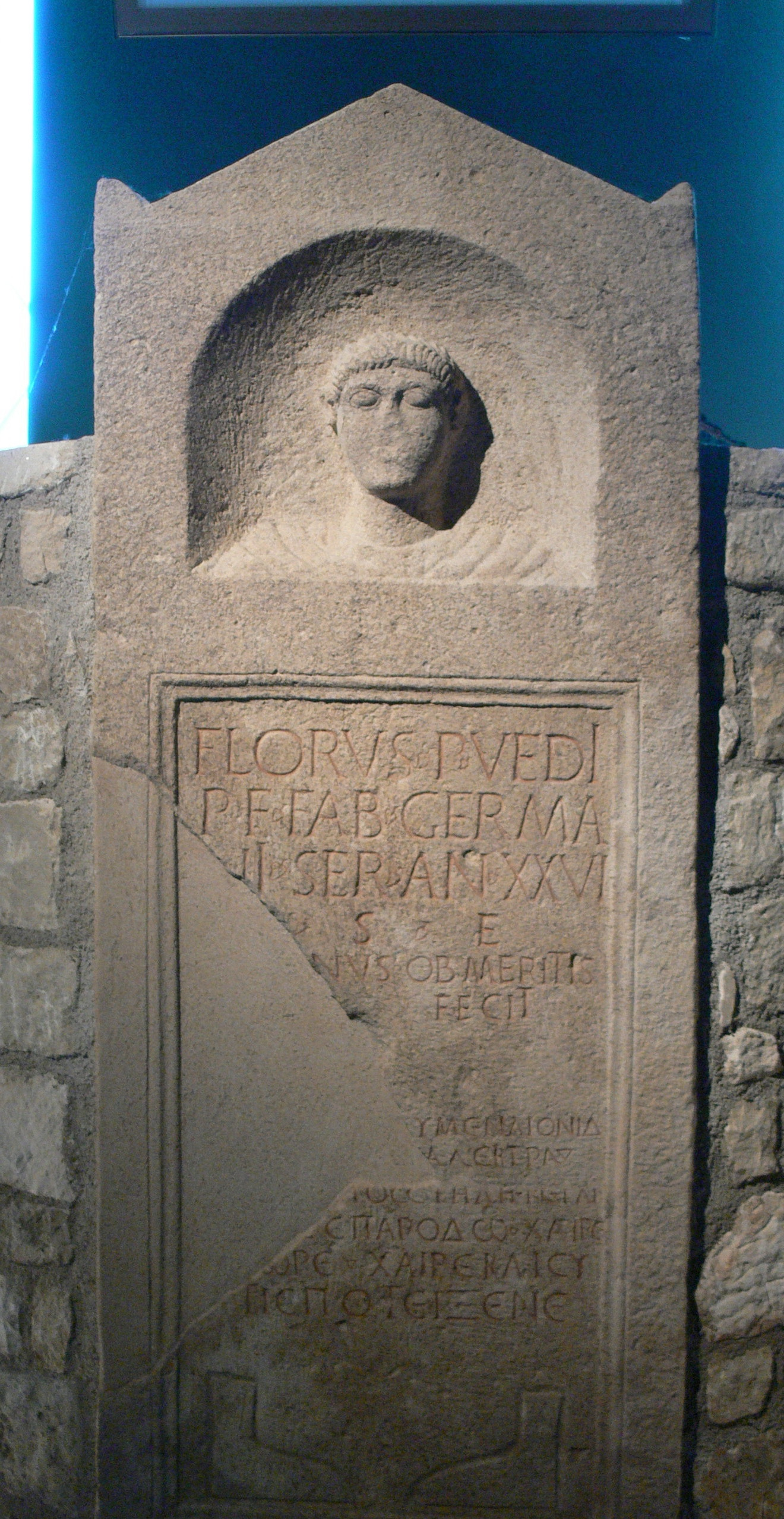
A bilingual Latin-Greek tombstone from Carnuntum for a 26-year-old slave named Florus, set up by his master ob meritis, in recognition of his merits (AE 1973, 421)

At the same time, despite this "natal alienation", slaves could not have been completely deprived by their masters of agency in carrying out everyday actions; even if the ongoing negotiation of power was grossly asymmetrical, as human beings slaves would have sought emotional connections and ways to improve their conditions in the moment. No single picture of the "typical" Roman slave's life emerges from the widely ranging conditions of work performed by slaves and the complex distinctions of legal status that affected the terms of their service, their prospects of manumission, and the degree to which they enjoyed rights if freed. The stratification of free Roman society manifests also in slave society, from penal slaves (servi poenae) at the bottom to the sometimes wealthy and influential slaves of the imperial house (servi caesaris) at the top, with an in-between range of slaves whose skills and knowledge gave them social value not defined by law.

Literary sources were mostly written by or for slaveholders, and inscriptions set up by slaves and freedmen preserve only glimpses of how they saw themselves. Elite literature indicates that how a Roman treated a slave was viewed as evidence of the master's character. Although the judicial torture of slaves was standard practice, a zeal for torture, particularly of a slave known to be loyal and truthful, was considered contemptible. Masters were expected to be neither gratuitously cruel and wrathful nor overly affectionate and attached to a slave. The type of the saeva domina (cruel slave mistress) emerges from Roman literature as the woman who flies into a rage at her handmaids' minor faults, stabbing them with pins or biting them and then punishing them with a beating. But Cicero was concerned that his grief over the death of Sositheus, a companionable young slave who had served him as a reader (Latin: anagnostes), might appear to others as excessive.

Plutarch writes approvingly that Cato bought slaves for their robust utility and never paid extra for mere good looks; but he finds fault with Cato for using his slaves like "beasts of burden" and then selling them off when they started to age "instead of feeding them when they were useless"—the implication being that a "good" master would provide care. Aulus Gellius in turn records an anecdote about Plutarch that exemplifies what slaveholders meant by restraint and moderate behavior. Plutarch owned a slave who had a philosophical education, despite or because of which he had developed a rebellious character. When Plutarch "for some offense or other" ordered him stripped and whipped, instead of screaming the slave began to shout that to act in anger in such a way was shameful for someone with philosophical pretensions. Plutarch simply replied, with utter composure, that he wasn't angry; they could continue their discussion along with the lashes. In one of the Moral Epistles often cited for its humane considerations of the slave as a human being, Seneca expressed the prevailing utilitarian view that a slave who was treated well would perform a better job than a poorly treated one.

=== Healthcare ===
Mentions in ancient literature of medical care for slaves are infrequent. The medical writer Rufus of Ephesus has one title among his works that stands out as not self-evidently medical: On the Purchase of Slaves, which presumably gave advice to the trade on assessing slave fitness and possibly their care, since health defects could invalidate a sale. Ongoing care would have depended on the utility of keeping workers healthy to maximize productivity, and at times on the owner's humane impulses or attachment to a particular slave. Pliny the Younger indicates that slaves did receive care from medici (medical attendants or physicians), but he observes that while "slaves and free persons differ not at all when they are in ill health, the free receive gentler and more merciful treatment

Pliny himself had sent his slave Zosimus, for whom he expresses his affection and esteem at length, to Egypt to seek therapy for a lung disease that had him coughing up blood. Zosimus was restored to health and at some point was manumitted, but the symptoms later returned. Pliny then wrote to ask if he could send Zosimus for rehab in the more healthful climate of a friend's country estate in a part of Gaul that is today the south of France.

Individual acts of compassion by slaveholders stand apart as exceptions. The practice of abandoning sick slaves on Rome's Tiber Island, where a temple to the healing god Aesculapius was located, led to such homelessness and contagion that the emperor Claudius decreed any slave who survived abandonment could not be reclaimed by his owner and was automatically free. Law was also enacted under Claudius that criminalized the killing of a sick or disabled slave as murder even by his owner.

While Roman law had no provision for medical malpractice, a physician who harmed or killed a slave through incompetence could be sued by the owner for property damage.

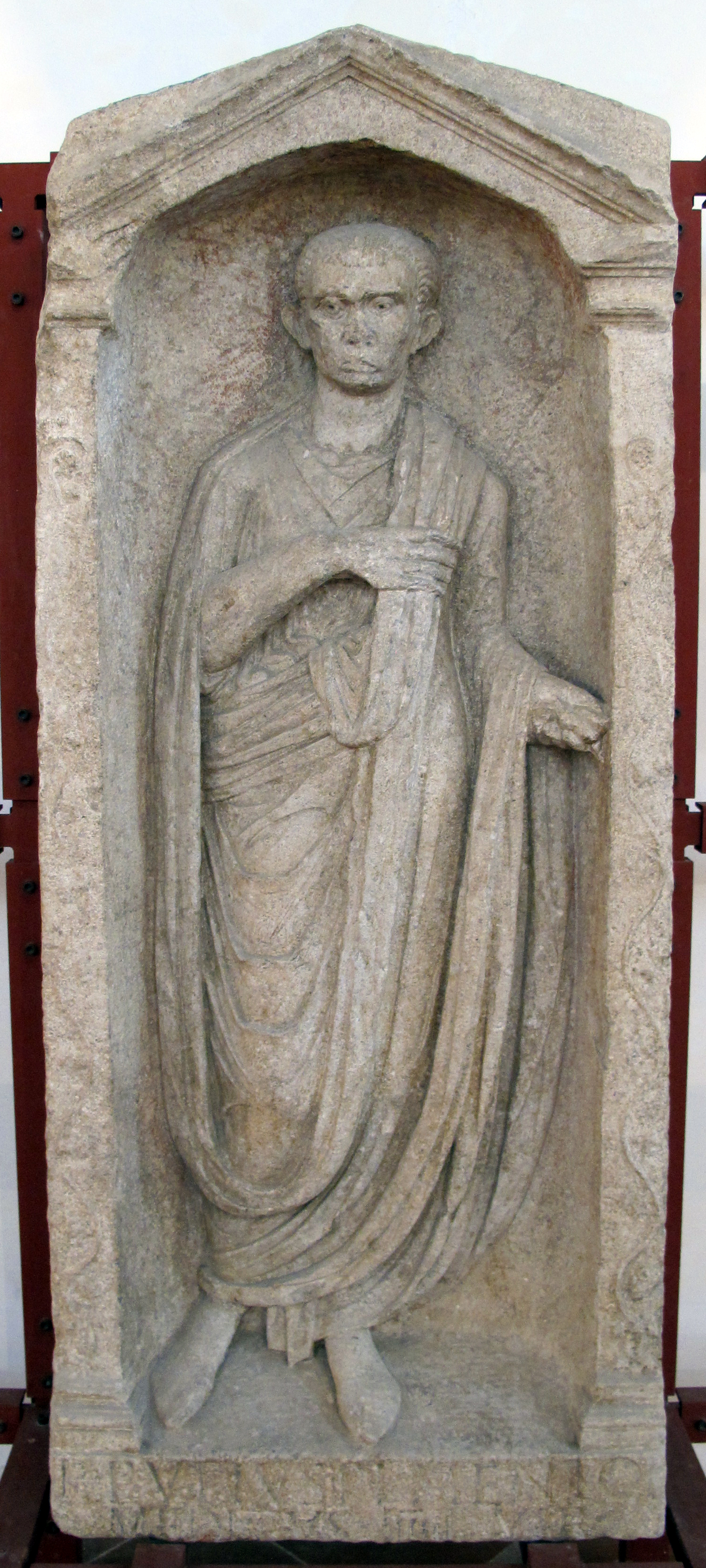
Publius Pupius Mentor, a freedman and medical doctor (Civico Lapidario, Umbria)

==== Physicians ====
Medicine was held in higher regard in Greece as a technē (art or skill) than it was in Rome. The best Greek medical schools did not admit slaves, and some city-states restricted slaves to practicing medicine only on fellow slaves. Though denied advanced theoretical study, slaves were part of a two-tier system to deliver care to the lower classes, and could receive often extensive training as physicians' assistants, becoming well versed in practical medicine.

At Rome, medicine was considered an unsuitable occupation for the upper classes because it requires tending to the needs of another's body. (Note: Noting Cicero's tactful if condescending dismissal that "professions such as medicine, architecture, and teaching of the liberal arts which either involve higher learning or are utilitarian to no small degree are honorable for those whose social status they are suited" (De officiis 1.42.151)—that status not being senatorial.) Elite households were attended by Greek physicians, either one of great prestige enticed to Rome with privileges and an offer of citizenship, or a staff of freedmen or enslaved medici. During the reign of Augustus, the celebrated Publius Decimus Eros Merula of Assisi was an enslaved clinical physician, surgeon, and eye specialist who eventually bought his freedom for 50,000 sesterces and left a fortune of 800,000. There were also free itinerant doctors who could be hired to provide care to households that lacked the means or desire to have a full-time medical attendant. Some slaves might assist with healthcare as nurses, midwives, medics, or orderlies During the Imperial era, the desire of freedmen to acquire medical training was such that it was exploited by scam medical schools.

The physician Galen, who came to Rome from Pergamum, developed his surgical techniques attending to the injuries of enslaved gladiators, and recorded a case study of one gladiator who had suffered a grievous wound to the abdomen but made a complete recovery after a high-risk omentectomy. From the perspective of the physician, the diversity of the city of Rome and its slave population made it an "exceptional field of observation".

=== Cicero and Tiro ===
Among Cicero's collected letters are those he wrote to one of his administrative slaves, the well-educated Tiro. Cicero remarked that he wrote to Tiro "for the sake of keeping to [his] established practice" and occasionally revealed personal care and concern for his slave, whose education he had taken into his own hands. He sought Tiro's opinions and seems to have expected him to speak with exceptional freedom, though in collecting Cicero's papers for publication, Tiro did not publish his own replies along with those of other correspondents. While these letters suggest a personal connection between master and slave, each letter contains a direct command, suggesting that Cicero relied on familiarity to ensure performance and loyalty from Tiro.

Tiro was either a verna or alumnus, part of the household from birth or childhood, and as Cicero's trusted secretary, he would have been afforded better living and working conditions than most slaves. He was freed before his master's death and was successful enough to retire on his own country estate, where he died at the age of 99.

=== Names ===
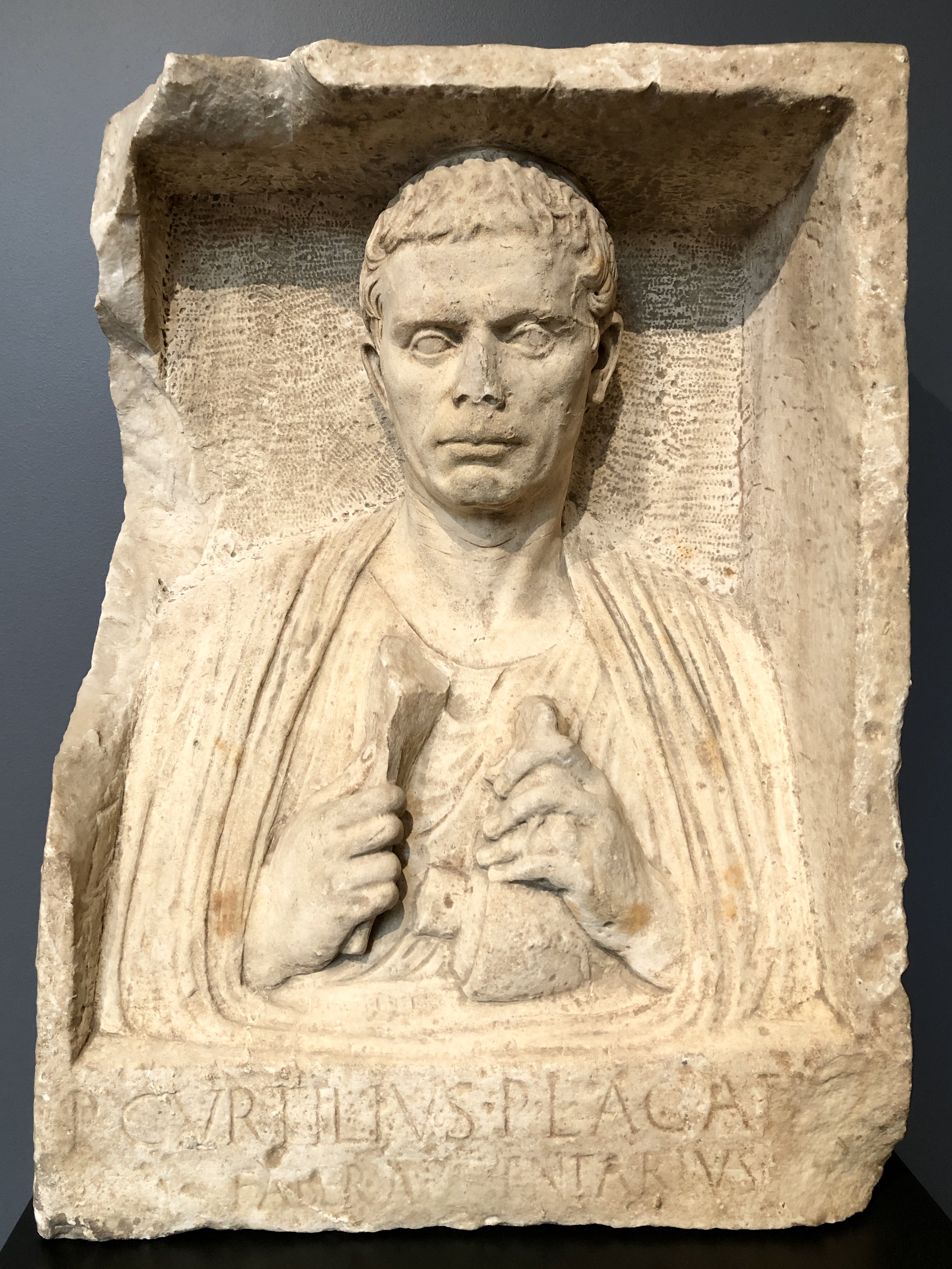
Publius Curtilius Agatho, a freed craftsman who worked in silver (Getty Villa Roman Collection)

As a freedman, Cicero's slave Tiro became Marcus Tullius Tiro, adopting Cicero's family name. The use of a single male name in an inscription or legal document is usually taken to indicate that the person was a slave. By the Late Republic, the nomenclature of freeborn Roman men had become normalized as the tria nomina: praenomen, first name; gentilicium, the name of the family or clan (gens); and cognomen, a distinguishing last name that originally was earned by an individual but then might be passed down, added to, or replaced. (Note: Because of the cultural importance of carrying on family lineage, Roman names are of limited variety, so that members of the same gens are often readily confused with one another in the historical sources.) When a slave was manumitted, he was renamed as free by the use of the tria nomina, most often appending his single name to the praenomen and gentilic name of his former master, now his patron. The use of a cognomen as a distinguishing third name became widespread among freedmen before it was standard for the upper class.

For example, the silversmith Publius Curtilius Agatho (d. early 1st century AD), known from his funerary monument, would have been called by his Greek name Agatho ("the Good") as a slave. Upon manumission he appended his patron's Latin names, Publius Curtilius, to create his full citizen name. Naturalized citizens followed this same convention, which might result in a tria nomina construction with two Latin names and a strikingly non-Latin cognomen. (Note: For example, Gaius Julius Vercondaridubnus was an Aeduan Gaul who held the first high priesthood in the imperial cult at the Sanctuary of the Three Gauls in the first century BC; his cognomen is distinctively Celtic, and his praenomen and gens name may indicate that Julius Caesar himself granted his family's citizenship,)

Throughout the Republican era, slaves in the city of Rome might bear a name that was also in use by free Italians or was common as a Roman praenomen, such as Marcus, or diminutives of the name (Marcio, Marcellus). Salvius, for example, was a very common name for slaves that was also in wide use as a free praenomen in Rome and throughout Italy during this time, morphing into names for freedpersons such as Salvianus, Salvillus (feminine Salvilla), and possibly Salvitto.

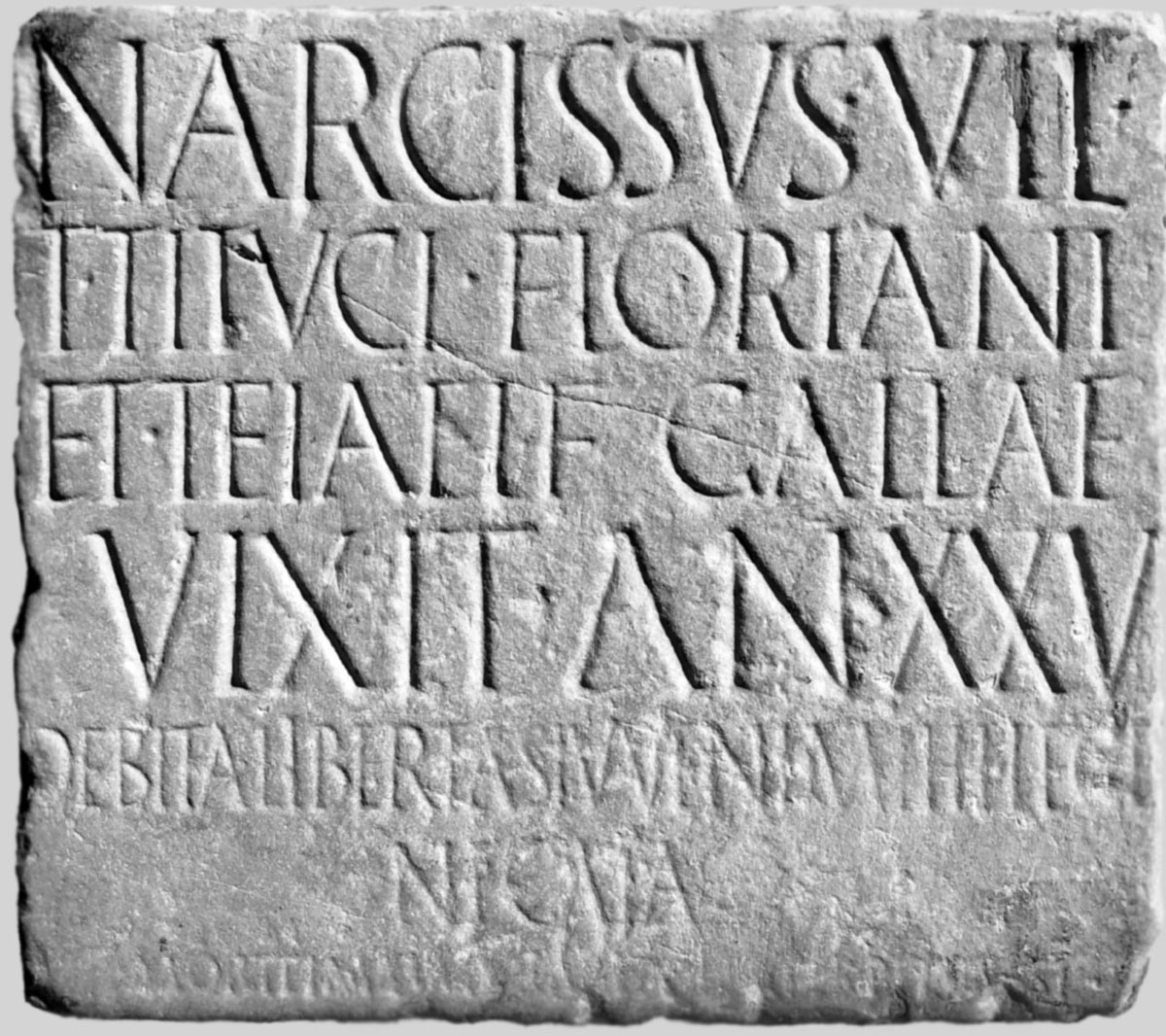
Epitaph for a Narcissus, one of the most popular Greek names for slaves

Ancient Roman scholars thought that in earliest times slaves had been given the first name of their master suffixed with -por, perhaps to be taken as a form of puer, "boy". Male slaves were often addressed as puer regardless of age; a slave was one who was never emancipated into adulthood and thus never allowed to become fully a man (vir). Names such as Marcipor, sometimes contracted to Marpor, are attested, Marcipor is also the name of a Menippean satire by Varro but rather than being suffixed to the master's name, the -por may have marked someone as a slave when his name was also in common use for free men.

In the Late Republic and Early Empire, more differentiation between slave and free names seems to have been desired. In Cicero's day, Greek names were the trend. Fanciful Greek names such as Hermes, Narcissus, and Eros were popular among the Romans but had not been used among free Greeks for either themselves or their slaves. Several of Cicero's slaves are known by name, mainly from the extensive collection of his letters; those with Greek names include the readers (anagnostes) Sositheus and Dionysius; Pollex, a footman; and Acastus. The slaves and freedmen Cicero mentions by name are most often his secretaries and literary assistants; he rarely refers by name to slaves whose duties were humbler. (Note: The status of some servants he names is not clear from context; they could be either slaves or freedmen still working for him.)

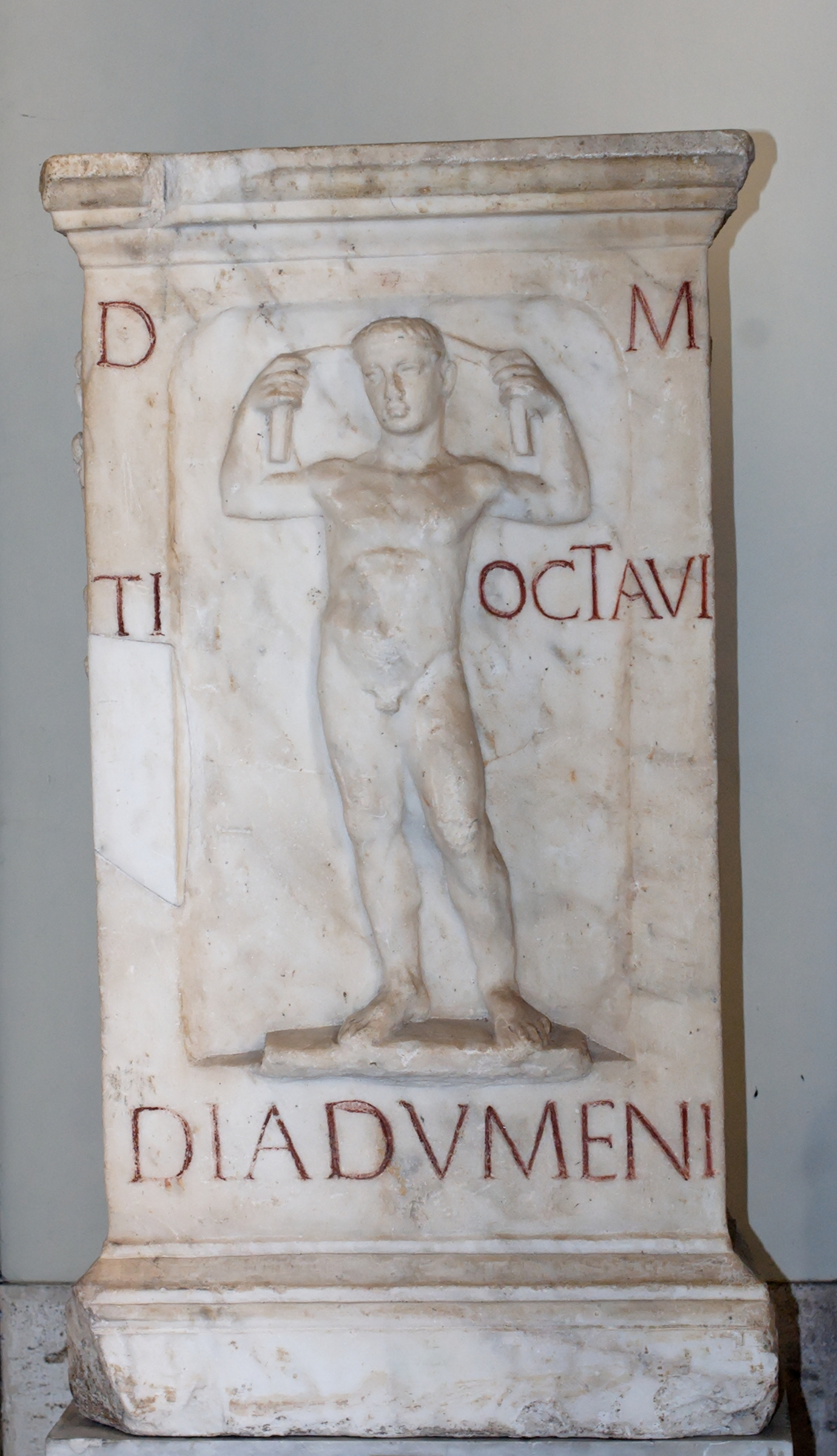
The only known instance of a Roman tombstone representing the deceased with a work of art and not his own portrait: the freedman Titus Octavius Diadumenus was objectified and named for a type of statue (diadumenos) that depicted a youth of "remarkable beauty" (Note: Pliny the Elder describes the "fillet-bearer" (diadumenos) statue type as a molliter iuvenis, a young man depicted with grace and softness (Natural History 34.55.)

Slave names at times may reflect ethnic origin; in the early Republic, Oscan names such as Paccius and Papus occur. But the distribution of slave names as recorded by inscriptions and papyri are cautions against assuming a slave's ethnicity based on the linguistic origin of their name. The first-century BC scholar Varro noted that some slaves had geographical names, such as Iona from Ionia, and was likely right to think these names indicated places where they were traded and not their ethnic origin, which by law had to be stated separately in sales documents.

Among the mismatched appellations found in surviving documents are the Greek names Hermes for a German, Paramone for a Jewish woman whose child was named Jacob, Argoutis for a Gaul, and Aphrodisia for a Sarmatian woman. In late antiquity, Christians might bear Greek names expressing a willing servility as a religious value, such as Theodoulos, "God's slave" (theos, "god"; doulos, "slave"). (Note: See also "Temple slaves".) German slaves memorialized in the family tomb of the Statilii in Rome mostly have Latin names such as Felix, Castus, Clemens, Urbanus, and Strenuus; two are named Nothus and Pothus, Latinized forms of Greek names. Greek names became so common for slaves that they began to be regarded as inherently servile; this taint may be why home-reared vernae, who generally had enhanced opportunities, are statistically more likely to have received a Latin name that would help them "pass" if they were manumitted. (Note: So argued by Bruun, "Greek or Latin? The owner's choice of names for vernae in Rome." Bruun also argues that naming your own children might have been one of the perks of being a verna.)

Gladiators are sometimes memorialized by what appear to be "stage names", such as Pardus ("the Leopard") or Smaragdus ("Emerald"). A slave who took a path other than citizen integration might also adopt a new name. The "Salvius" who was the first leader of the Sicilian slave revolt in 104 BC restyled himself as Tryphon.

In Latin epitaphs, a slave commemorating his deceased master sometimes refers to him by praenomen with the pronoun noster, for example "our Marcus". In speaking of himself to a person of higher status, a slave might identify by his role in relation to his master's first name; Cicero records a conversation in which a slave owned by Mark Antony is asked "Who are you?" (Quis tu?) and replies "The tabellarius [courier] from Marcus" (a Marco tabellarius). A standard phrase in sales contracts refers to the slave "named so-and-so, or by whatever name he/she is called"—the slave's name was subject to the master's whim.

=== Clothing ===
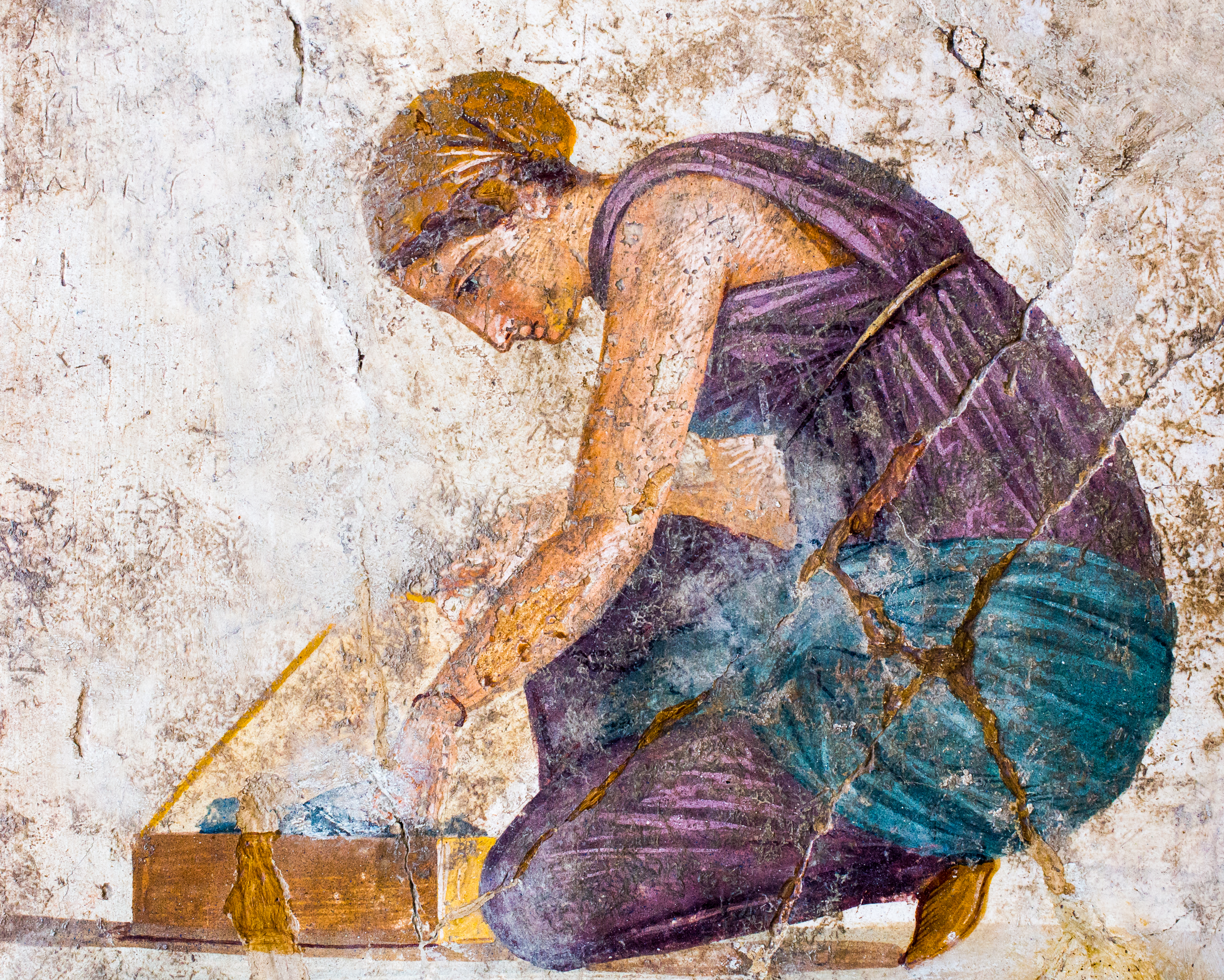
Handmaid looking through a storage box, detail of a wall painting from Pompeii

Certain items of clothing or adornment were restricted by law to freeborn people entitled to wear them as markers of high status; "slave clothing" (vestis servilis) was clothing of lesser quality that lacked distinguishing features—slaves did not wear clothing meant to identify them as such. The clothing of slaves was determined primarily by the kind of work they did and secondarily by the wealth of the household they belonged to. Most working slaves would have been given clothing that looked like that of free people who did similar work; Diocletian's edict on price controls (301 AD) lists clothes for "common people or slaves" as a single category. In a crowd, slaves would not have been immediately legible as unfree, as the everyday attire of most people was a tunic. Men wore a shorter tunic, while the tunics of women covered the legs.

In depictions of domestic scenes, tunics of handmaids (ancillae) are sometimes shorter, reaching to mid-calf, while the mistress's tunic falls to her feet. In a mosaic from Sidi Ghrib, the handmaids wear ankle boots, and ancillary hairstyles are simpler than those of the centrally depicted mistress. Female slaves tucked in the loose fabric of their tunics under the bust and shaped the sleeves with belting to give themselves more freedom of movement for their tasks. An ancilla in one of the comedies of Plautus is mocked "for dressing above her station" and wearing bronze rings.

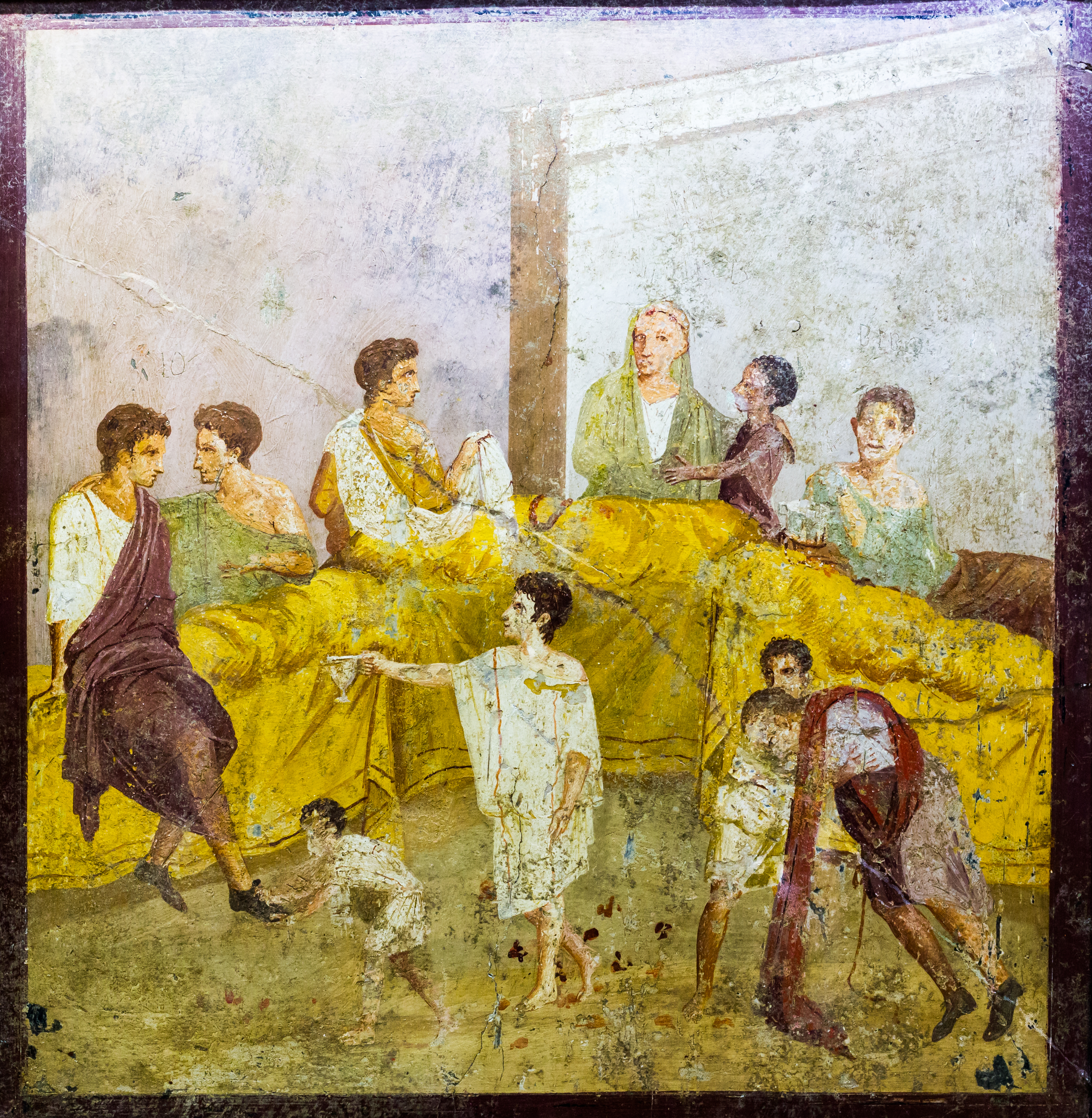
A dinner party in a wall painting from Pompeii: a small slave in a white tunic (lower left) helps the master with his shoes; the slave in the center offers him a drink; another slave (lower right) supports a vomiting guest who's overindulged. (Note: The scene may suggest a sequential narrative—changing into party shoes, drinking, the aftermath upon departure—rather than the simultaneous actions of two different guests.)

Domestic slaves who would be visible to the family and their guests were given garments that met their owners' standards for pleasing appearance and quality. Presentability was desired for slaves who served as personal attendants. Slaves wore few accessories but were themselves an extension of their masters' accessories. Because Roman clothing lacked structured pockets, the slaves who always accompanied the well-to-do on excursions carried anything needed. They might hold parasols or wield fans to shield the privileged from the heat. They went with them to the public baths to watch over their valuable clothing, since theft was common in the dressing areas. At dinner parties, guests took off their outdoor shoes and put on light house shoes (soleas), so a rich attendee would bring a slave to wrangle their footwear.

Clothing for laborers was meant to be economical, durable, and practical. A relief from Roman Germany shows mine workers wearing a tunic and an apron of leather "feathers" (pteruges). Columella recommended weather-resistant clothing of leather, patchwork, and "thick shoulder capes" for farm workers. A male farm slave working for the stern and frugal Cato could expect to be issued a tunic and a cloak (sagum) every other year, and would have to turn in the old outfit so it could be recycled for patchwork. The fragility of textiles makes them rare in the archaeological record, but a store of regularly cut pieces measuring about 10 by 15 centimeters from Roman Egypt, found at the Mons Claudianus quarry, is evidence of organized patchworking.

One of the causes of the Sicilian slave rebellion of 135 BC, which broke out among rural workers, was the master's refusal to accept responsibility for providing clothing. When the enslaved herdsmen came asking, the master, Damophilos, told them to get their own clothes, so they did—by banding together to raid small farms and waylay travelers. When violence escalated to full-scale insurrection, Damophilos was among the first to be killed.

At one point, the Roman senate debated whether to require slaves to wear a sort of uniform to distinguish them as such, but eventually decided that was a bad idea: it would make the enslaved more conscious of having a group identity, and they would see how strong their numbers were.

== Resistance and control ==
Open rebellion and mass violence arose among the large population of the enslaved only sporadically across the millennium of ancient Roman history. A more persistent form of resistance was escape; as Moses Finley remarked, "Fugitive slaves are almost an obsession in the sources." Runaway slaves were considered criminals and were harshly punished.

Resistance might occur on a daily basis at a low-grade, even comic level. Cato, without suspecting that this might be deliberate mischief, was concerned that his taking of the auspices at home, which required ritual silence, would be vitiated by the farting of his napping slaves. Plutarch tells the story of how one Pupius Piso, having ordered his slave not to speak unless spoken to, waited in embarrassment and in vain for the guest of honor to arrive at his dinner party. The slave had received the guest's regrets, but the master didn't ask him to speak, so he didn't.

A master might even seek to extend his control over a slave beyond his own death; although wills were a common way to manumit slaves, they sometimes included clauses that expressly prohibited the freeing of certain slaves perceived as unworthy.

=== Rebellions ===
The earliest slave uprisings occurred during, and in the immediate aftermath of, the Second Punic War, when many slaves held by the Romans would have been soldiers captured from the armies of Hannibal, and when at times as many as half the Roman male population of fighting age would have been away serving in the military. The Augustan historian Livy is the main but not always a clear source for these uprisings.

The first recorded rebellion comes in 217 BC, when an informer reported that twenty-five slaves were conspiring on the Campus Martius; they were punished in the earliest securely attested instance of crucifixion among the Romans. In 198 BC, Carthaginian captives rebelled at Setia, which they may have held briefly before being met with force and fleeing, though two thousand were captured and executed. They next made an attempt on Praeneste but were again defeated, resulting in the execution of another five hundred. This uprising prompted more policing of the streets and the building of places of confinement. Two years later, it took a full legion to quell an uprising in Etruria, after which the leaders were flogged and crucified.

The last rebellion of this period broke out in 185 BC in Apulia among herdsman, who were also to play a leading role in the first two Servile Wars. The Apulian shepherds were accused of banditry (latrocinium), and 7,000 were condemned to death; some escaped.

The Greek historian Diodorus Siculus (1st century BC) chronicled the three major slave rebellions of the Roman Republic known as the Servile Wars, the first two of which originated in Rome's first province, Sicily. Diodorus gives the total number of slaves participating in the first rebellion as 200,000 (elsewhere, the figure is given as 60,000–70,000), and 40,000 in the second. (Note: Some scholars question whether Sicilian grain production or ranching was extensive enough at this time to sustain such large-scale slaveholding, or the extent to which the rebellions might also have attracted poorer or disadvantaged free persons.) While these large round numbers in ancient sources seem inflated, their significance here lies in indicating the scope of rebellion.

==== First Servile War (135–132 BC) ====
The First Servile War began as a protest by enslaved herdsmen against deprivation and mistreatment, localized on the "ranch" (latifundium) of Damophilos in Enna, but soon spread to include slaves in the thousands. They attained a major strategic objective in controlling both Enna and Agrigentum, two towns key to holding Sicily that Rome and Carthage had fought over repeatedly during the first two Punic Wars. To assure a food supply, they refrained from laying waste to the farms around their strongholds and did not target small farmers. They were militarily capable of mounting direct confrontations with Roman troops, which were brought to bear speedily.

The leader, Eunus, maintained communal cohesion and motivation on the model of the Hellenistic kings, even restyling himself by name as Antiochus and minting coins. Slave families formed a community at the stronghold of Tauromenium. The rebel slaves were able to sustain their movement within the difficult Sicilian environment for four years—eight or more, in some accounts—before Roman forces managed a decisive defeat, primarily by besieging and starving out Tauromenium.

==== Second Servile War (104–100 BC) ====
The Second Servile War had its roots in the piratical kidnapping that subjected freeborn people to random seizure and enslavement mostly in the eastern Mediterranean. People who had been enslaved illegally in this way had a right to reclaim their freedom under the recently passed Lex de Plagiariis, a law concerning piracy and the slave trade associated with it. The praetor assigned to Sicily, Licinius Nerva, had been holding hearings and releasing the enslaved in numbers great enough to offend the privilege of the slaveholding landowners, who pressured him to desist—whereupon the slaves revolted. The rebellion started in two households and soon encompassed 22,000 slaves.

Their leader, whose slave name was Salvius, adopted the name Tryphon, perhaps in honor of Diodotus Tryphon to rally the many enslaved Cilicians among the rebels. He organized the slaves into cavalry and infantry units, besieged Morgantina and—along with the slave general Athenion (Note: Athenion's name is inscribed on several sling bullets found at multiple sites in Sicily.)—had a string of early successes against Roman troops as the number of rebels grew to "immense proportions". Unlike the first rebellion, however, they were unable to hold towns or maintain supply lines, and seem to have lacked the long-term strategic objectives of Eunus; the less focused, at times incompetent Roman response enabled them to prolong the rebellion.

Eunus and Salvius each had held a privileged place in his household when enslaved; both Eunus and Athenion are noted as having been born into freedom. These experiences may have enhanced their ability to lead through articulating a vision of life beyond slavery.

==== Third Servile War (73–71 BC) ====
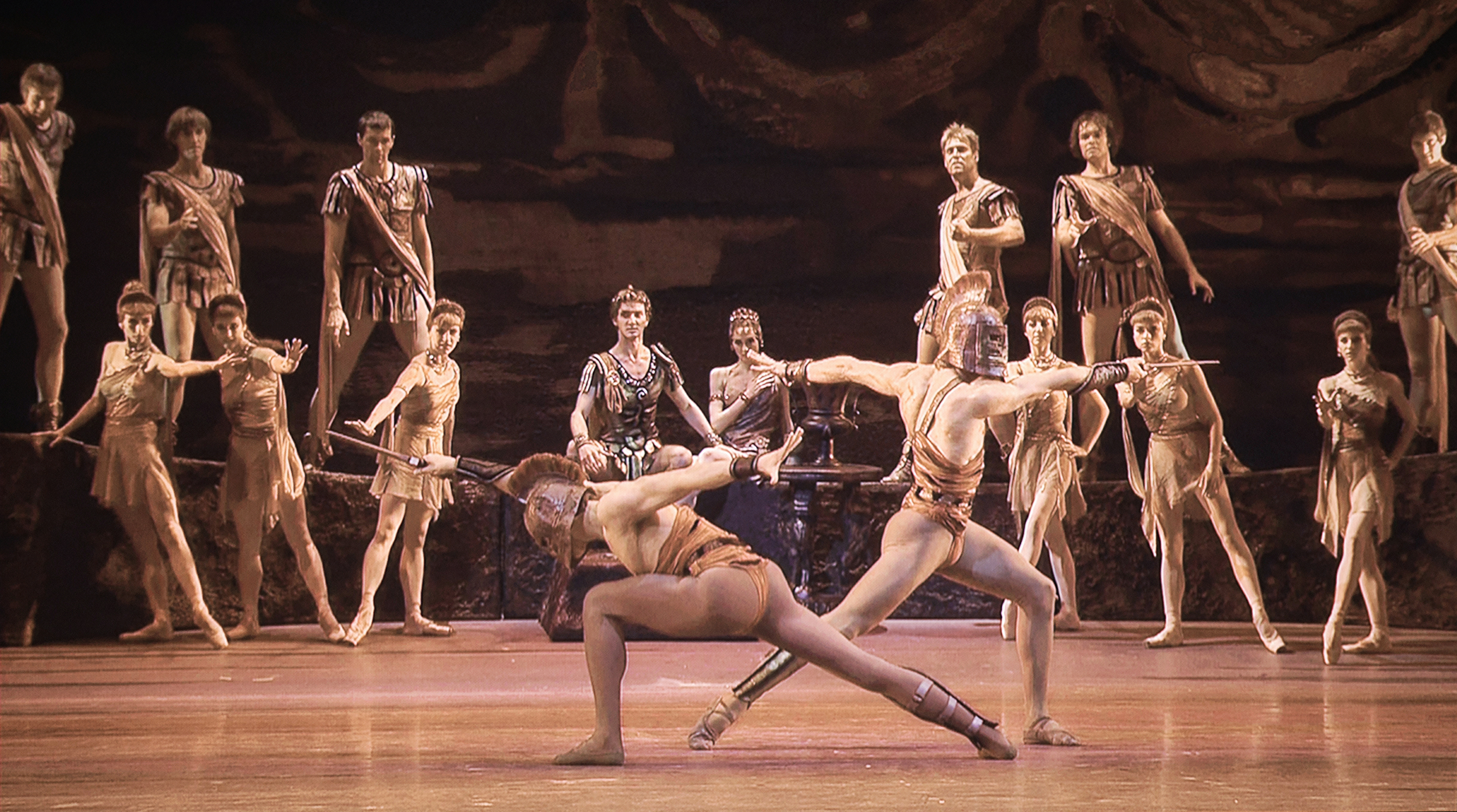
The Third Servile War has lent itself to countless cultural interpretations; the Soviet-era ballet Spartacus, composed by Aram Khachaturian, has been perennially restaged since 1956 by the Bolshoi (here in 2013) to suit the prevailing ideology.

The Third Servile War was shorter than the two earlier servile wars, and the rebels' aim was "to break the bonds of their own grievous oppression". Its leader, Spartacus, became one of antiquity's best-known slaves and has been widely portrayed in literature, art, and Marxist historiography – so much so that later interpretations have shaped how the rebellion is understood.

The rebellion broke out on a relatively trivial scale, only seventy-four gladiators from a training school in Capua. The two best-known leaders are the Thracian fighter Spartacus, who in some accounts is said to have served formerly in the Roman auxiliary troops, and the Gaul Crixus. They entrenched themselves at Vesuvius and quickly dispatched the forces of three successive praetors as the insurgency grew to 70,000 men "with alarming speed", both slaves and free herdsmen joining up, ultimately reaching a force of 120,000.

Spartacus's plan seems to have been to head to northern Italy, where the men could disperse and head to their countries of origin, free; but the Gauls were keen on plundering first and spent weeks ravaging southern Italy, giving the Romans a more urgent reason and time to make up for their "tardy and ineffective" initial response. Crixus and his Gauls were soon dealt with, but Spartacus got as far north as Cisalpine Gaul before turning back for a possible assault on Rome, about which he then changed his mind. After more rebel military successes without clear objectives, the senate gave Marcus Crassus special command of the consular forces, and the tide of the war turned.

Spartacus headed south, hoping to cross to Sicily and "resuscitate the embers" of the slave rebellion three decades earlier; instead, the pirates who had accepted payment for transport set sail without him. After some weeks of increasingly successful fighting, Crassus obtained a victory in which Spartacus was said to have died, though his body was not identified; 5,000 fugitives fled north and ran into troops led by Pompey, who "annihilated" them; and Crassus concluded his victory by crucifying 6,000 captured rebels along the Appian Way.

==== Later uprisings ====
The last slave rebellion of the Republic was put down at Thurii in southern Italy by Gaius Octavius, the father of the future emperor Augustus. In 60 BC, Octavius received a commission from the senate to hunt down fugitives who were alleged (emphasis on "alleged") to be the remnants of Spartacus's men and slaves who had been drawn into the Catilinarian conspiracy.

Though they failed, the Servile Wars left Romans with a deep-seated fear of slave uprisings that resulted in stricter laws regulating the keeping of slaves and harsher measures and punishments to keep enslaved people under control. In AD 10, the senate decreed that if a master was killed by one or a group of his slaves, all the slaves "under the same roof" were to be tortured and executed. In the early Imperial period, the slave uprisings against Lucius Pedanius Secundus, who was killed by one of his household slaves (all 400 were executed), and Larcius Maceo, a praetor who was murdered in his private bath, occasioned panic among slaveholders but failed to catch fire as the Sicilian rebellions had. None of the sporadic attempts at rebellion over the next centuries encompassed nearly as much territory as that led by Spartacus.

=== Fugitive slave-catching ===
Fugitive slaves were considered criminals, whose crime was theft of the owner's property—themselves. From the perspective of owners, runaway slaves not only caused economic harm but stoked fears of a return to the social upheavals of the Servile Wars. The harboring of fugitive slaves was against the law, and professional slave-catchers (fugitivarii) were hired to hunt down runaways. Advertisements were posted with precise descriptions of escaped slaves, and offered rewards.

Slave-catching was an unusually intensive police activity in that it involved coordination among all four forms of policing in the Roman Empire, which otherwise operated more or less independently: civilian or private security forces; the imperial guard; troops under the command of provincial governors, or municipal public slaves used as a quasi-police force; and the Roman army. Augustus himself boasted in his official record of achievements of having 30,000 fugitive slaves rounded up and returned for punishment to their owners.

Although the Apostle Paul expresses sympathy for runaway slaves, and some Christians seem to have taken in runaways, fugitives were still a concern as the Empire was Christianized. The Synod of Gangra in the mid-4th century placed any Christian who encouraged slaves to escape under anathema.

==== The fugitive in Roman culture ====
In a society where slavery was not based on race, a slave who escaped could hope to blend in and go unnoticed among the free. Certain temples in Greece had long offered asylum to slaves who ran away, and in the Imperial era, a fugitive could claim asylum at the foot of the emperor's statue.

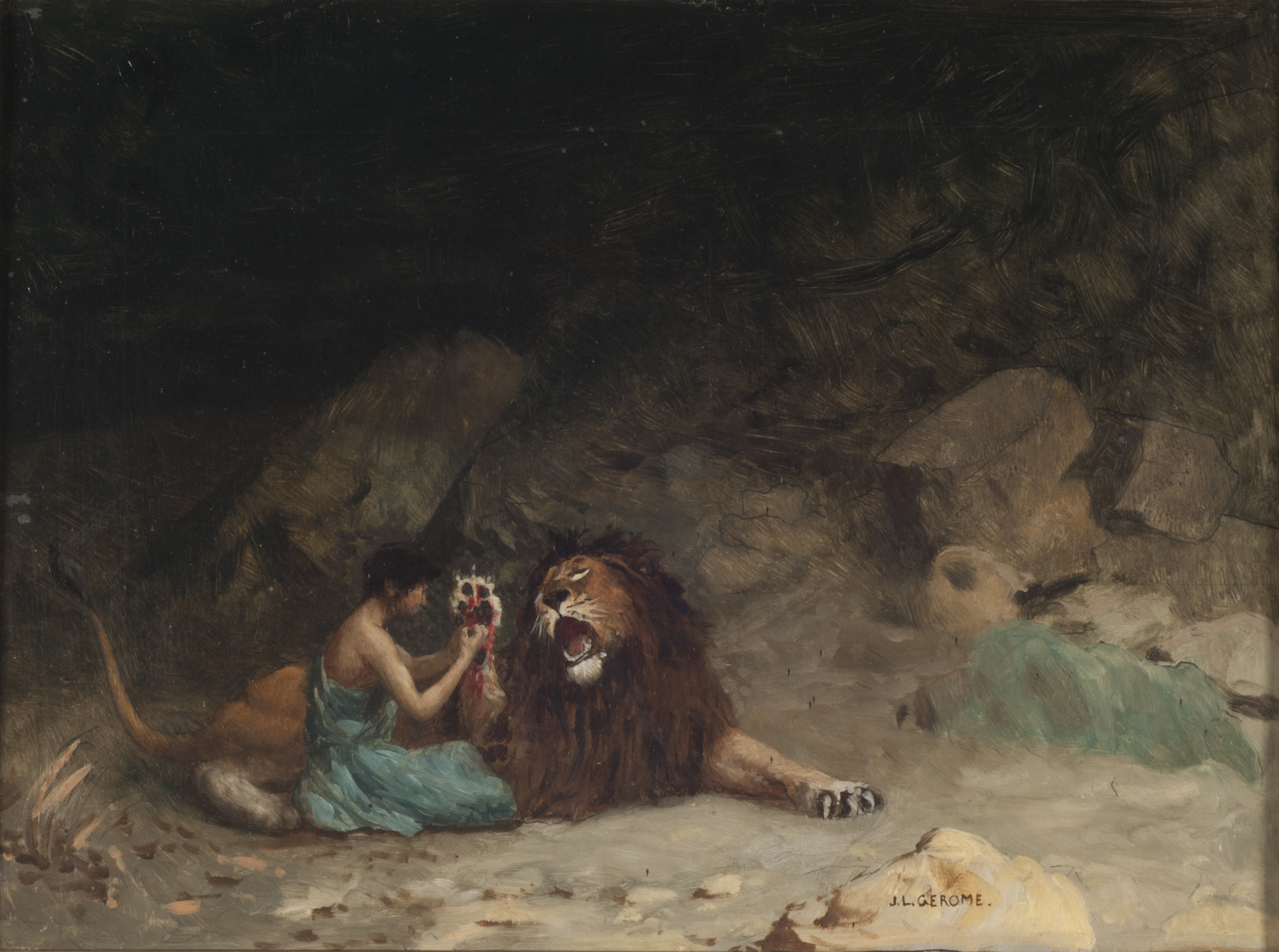
Androcles (1902) by the French academic painter Jean-Léon Gérôme, a different take from the scenes of violence in the Roman arena for which Gérôme helped establish modern visual conventions

A fugitive slave is the protagonist of a tale that became familiar from the fables of Aesop, who according to tradition was himself traded as a slave. The earliest written version of Androclus and the lion is narrated by Aulus Gellius (2nd century AD). Androclus is serving in the household of the Roman proconsul for the province of Africa, who had him beaten unjustly every day. Driven to escape, he seeks solitude in the wilderness, resigned to death by starvation, which would at least bring him peace. When he comes upon a lion nursing its wounded paw, he removes the thorn causing pain, thereby becoming a medicus for the beast. The two live as companions in the wild for three years, with the lion providing food.

One day when the lion is out on the hunt, Androclus goes walking and is captured by soldiers, taken back to Rome, and condemned to the beasts in the arena. But as it turns out, the lion he had befriended has also been captured, and instead of attacking him fawns over him affectionately. Caligula himself is among the spectators, and the emperor pardons both Androclus and the lion, who are thereafter spotted strolling freely about the city as companions. Gellius sketches the story within the specific framework of a Roman slave's experience: desperation, escape, capture and punishment, and the fantasy of mercy and freedom.

The experiences of captives, slaves, and fugitives were on constant display in Roman culture. The Captivi ("Captives") of Plautus is a comedy, but with "a plot featuring kidnapping, enslavement, chaining, direct discussions of flight, and torturous punishments … that were extreme enough to serve as an example to other slaves".

=== Punishments ===
As the Romans increased the numbers of slaves they held, their fear of them grew, as did the severity of discipline. Cato the Elder whipped the household slaves for even small mistakes and kept his enslaved agricultural workers in chains during the winter. In the Satyricon, the immensely specialized household staff of the fictional freedman Trimalchio includes a pair of torturers who stand by with whips. The physician Galen observed slaves being kicked, beaten with fists, and having their teeth knocked out or their eyes gouged out, witnessing the impromptu blinding of one slave by means of a reed pen. Galen himself had been taught not to strike a slave with his hand but always to use a reed whip or strap. The future emperor Commodus at age 12 is supposed to have ordered one of his bath attendants to be thrown into the furnace, though this order may not have been carried out.

In his treatise De Ira ("On Anger"), Seneca offers a lurid anecdote on the proportionality of punishment, famously retold, referenced, and analyzed. At a dinner party hosted by Vedius Pollio with Augustus in attendance, a young slave broke a crystal cup. Vedius flew into a rage and ordered him seized and thrown into the lamprey pond to be fed upon. (Note: Fishkeeping was a hobby dear to some upperclass Romans, both for pleasure and as a source of fresh delicacies for the table. Lampreys (muraenae) were eaten, but some scholars have wondered whether Vedius may rather have kept moray eels for this purpose.) The boy wriggled away and threw himself at Augustus's feet, begging to be killed rather than eaten alive—apparently aware that the lamprey "clamps its mouth on the victim and bores a dentated tongue into the flesh to ingest blood". Taken aback by the sheer novelty of this cruel punishment, Augustus ordered the boy set free, the rest of the crystal smashed, and the lamprey pond backfilled. Vedius, who became a "stock villain" in Latin literature, fell so out of favor for this and other more political reasons that Augustus eventually razed his entire villa. Seneca bookends his moral criticism of Vedius in De Clementia ("On Mercy"), comparing the torture pond to a snake pit and saying that Vedius was universally despised for his excessive cruelty.

Such acts of casual sadism are perhaps to be distinguished from the head of household's ancient right to pass sentence on a dependent for perceived wrongdoing, but the slaveholder's right to punish a slave was only weakly limited by law. The censors were a countervailing moral authority (regimen morum) if the paterfamilias exceeded community standards of cruelty, but the office was often left vacant or manipulated toward other ideological ends, and there is little or no evidence that the censors would rebuke others of their class for the abuse of slaves. Unless the excessive cruelty had been blatantly public, there was no process for bringing it to the attention of the authorities—the slave boy targeted by Vedius was saved extrajudicially by the chance presence of an emperor willing to be offended, the only person with the authority to stop what was allowed by law.

When slaves did commit an actual crime, the penalties prescribed by law were far more severe than for free persons. For instance, the regular penalty for counterfeiting was deportation and confiscation of property, but a slave was put to death. The liberty of a Roman citizen, by contrast, was defined by freedom from physical coercion and by the judicial right of appeal after receiving a capital sentence. This definition holds into the early Imperial era as a common understanding: in the Acts of the Apostles, when Paul asserts his rights as a Roman citizen to a centurion after having been bound and threatened with flogging, the tribune who has seized him acknowledges the error by backing off.

In the later Imperial era, the status of "convict" versus "slave" often becomes a distinction without a practical difference, as free people of lower social status were increasingly subjected to more severe legal penalties once reserved for slaves.

==== Chaining ====
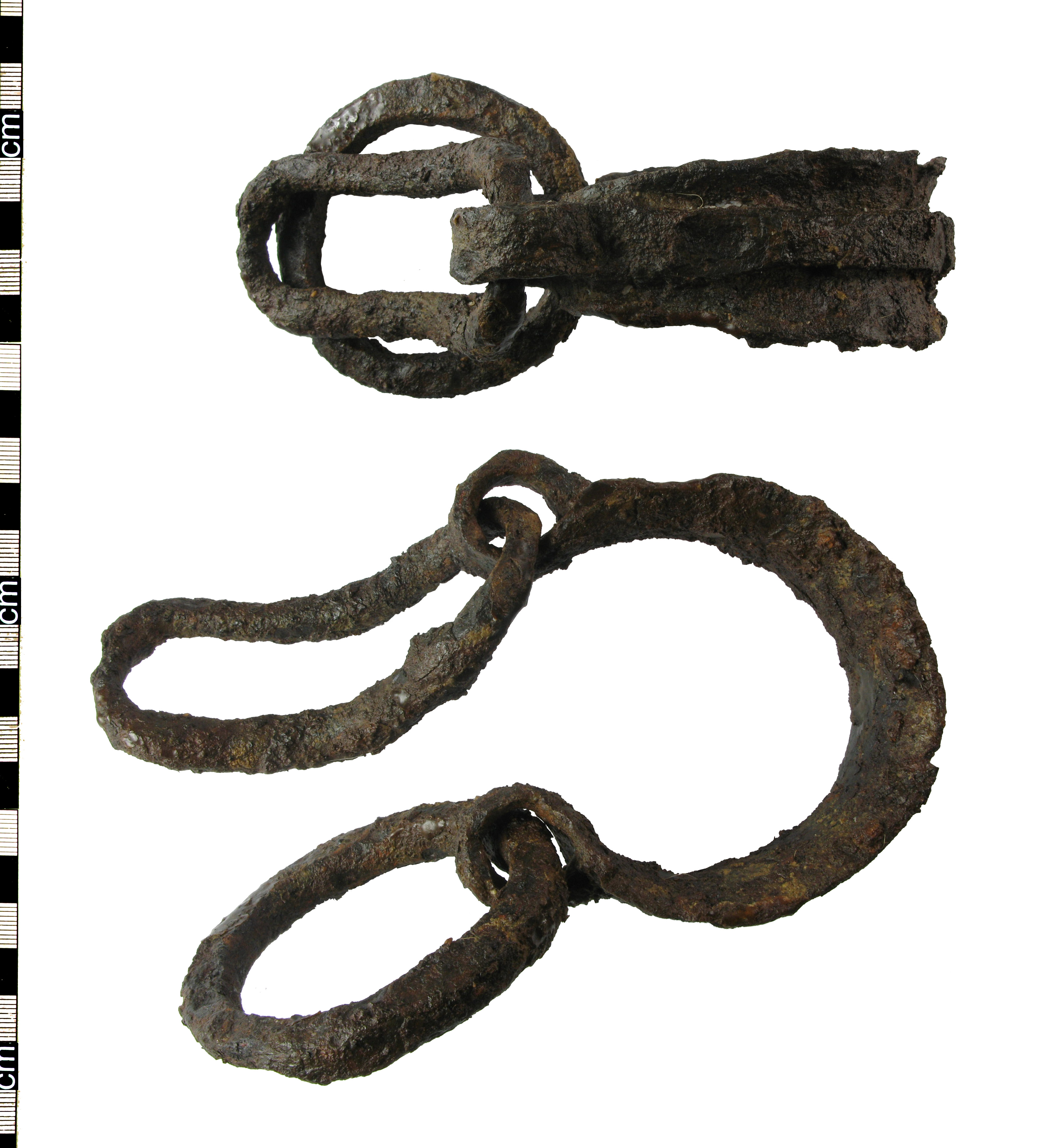
Slave shackle from Roman Britain

Chaining was a legal penalty imposed with some specificity; chains weighing ten pounds were ordered for the enslaved captives who rebelled in 198 BC. Archaeological evidence of fetters, manacles, and shackles has been found mainly in the northern provinces and only infrequently in Italian villa settings.

In the Republican period, a large agricultural estate would have an ergastulum (plural ergastula), a place of work confinement, built partially underground, where slaves were often kept in chains for disobedience, acts of resistance, or committing crimes. Slaves sent to the ergastulum might be sold for exploitation in gladiatorial games. However, despite the assumptions of some scholars and modern images of chained slaves at hard labor, there is no evidence that agricultural slaves routinely worked in chain gangs. Roman writers on agriculture regarded slaves who were controllable only through chaining as an inferior form of farm labor and deprecated their use on the commercial latifundia under absentee ownership.

A slave who had been put in chains as punishment was labeled thereafter as a servus vinctus. As a category of property value, the "chained slave" had to be identified as such if sold, and would bring a lower price on the market. As a category of legal status, after the Augustan law that created a class of slaves to be counted permanently among the dediticii who were technically free but held no rights, the servus vinctus was barred from obtaining citizenship even if manumitted.

==== Tattooing and branding ====
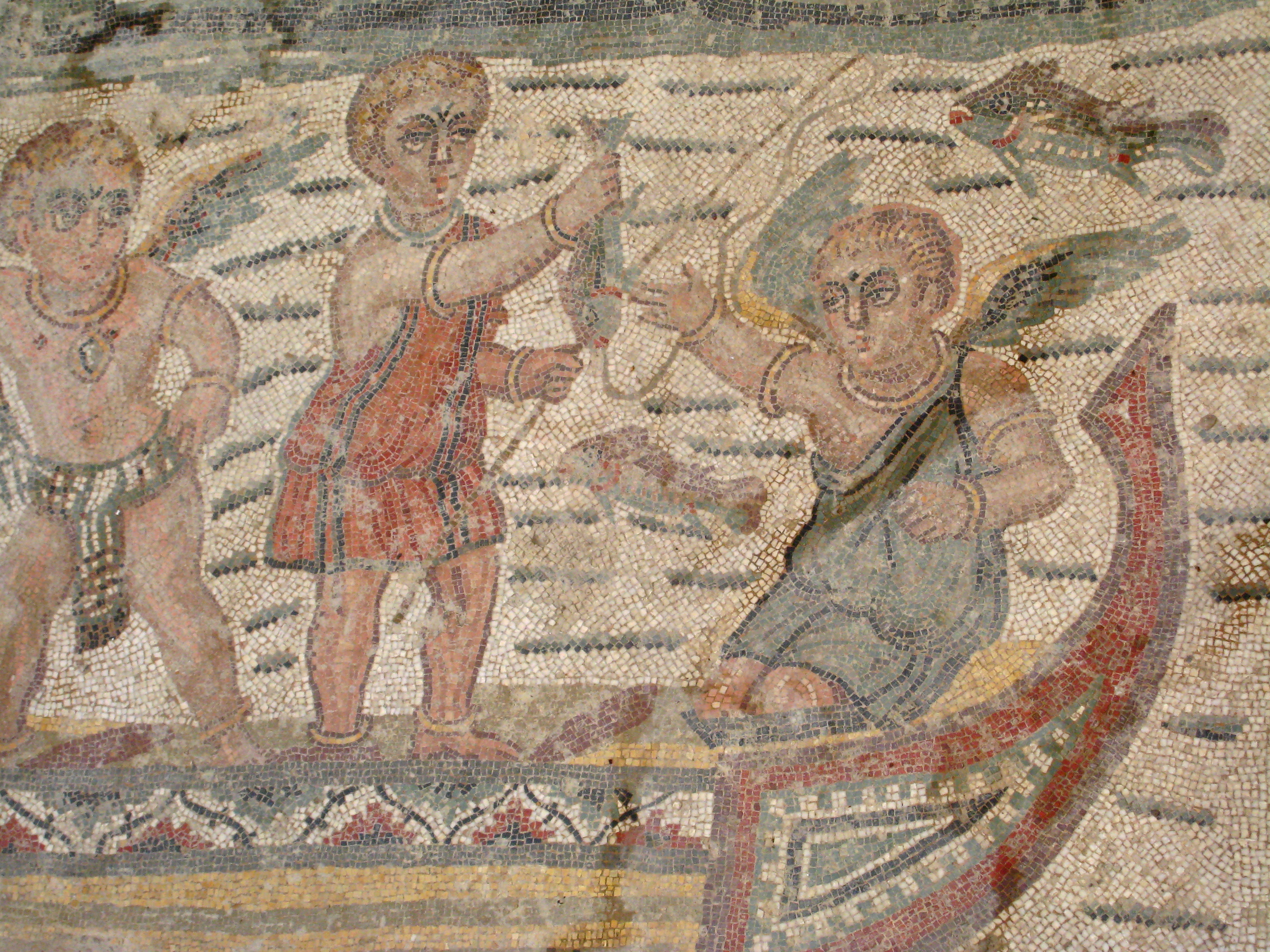
Mosaic (early 4th century) depicting two fishermen Cupids at left wearing servile clothing, with a V for Venus forehead tattoo chastising them as penal slaves of love

Fugitive slaves might be marked by letters tattooed on their forehead, called stigmata in Greek and Latin sources, a practice most attested as a consequence of condemnation to hard labor. The tattooing of slaves had been expressly banned in Hellenistic Egypt except as part of a criminal sentence, when a forehead tattoo came with a beating. The Romans picked up slave tattooing from the Greeks, who in turn had acquired it from the Persians. Attic comedy frequently mentions slave stigmata, and the most notable passage in Latin literature comes in the Satyricon when Encolpius and Giton fake tattooing as an absurd form of disguise. Tattooing slaves with text to mark them as previous fugitives is most abundantly attested among the Greeks, and there is "no direct evidence for what was inscribed on runaways' foreheads in Rome", though criminals generally were labeled with the name of their crime. Literature alludes to the practice, as when the epigrammatist Martial satirizes a luxuriously attired freedman at the theater who keeps his inscribed forehead under wraps, and Libanius mentions a slave growing out bangs to cover his stigmata.

In inscriptions from the Temple of Asclepius at Epidaurus, Greek slaves who had been tattooed ask the god to remove their markings, and in some cases thank him for doing so. Less miraculous means might also be sought, as various sources record medical procedures for removing stigmata, mostly herbal applications for which complete success was not guaranteed.

The evidence for Roman branding of slaves is less certain. The methodical tortures to which slaves were subjected juridically included the application of hot metal plates or rods, which would leave marks that could be seen as brands, since the branding of herd animals is known in the Roman world. The scars left by whipping were also "read" as inscribing slaves.

Slaves who played visible or public roles on behalf of a household, and female slaves in general, were not disfigured with markings. That stigmatized slaves were those who had been marked as irredeemably criminal is indicated by their inclusion among the dediticii, those who held no citizen rights even if manumitted.

==== Collaring ====
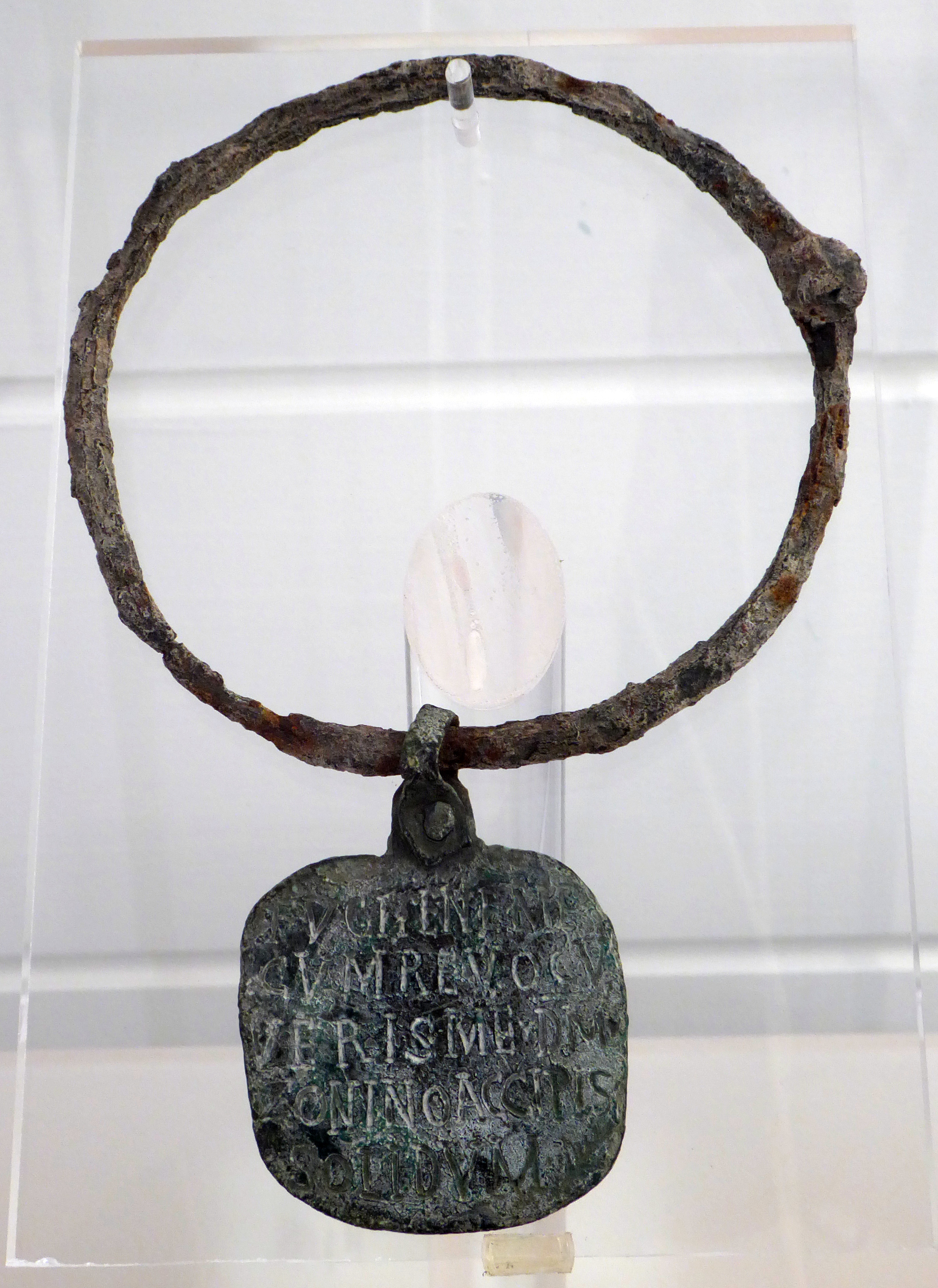
Zoninus collar, late Roman slave collar (4th/5th century CE), inscribed with a promise of a gold coin reward for returning the enslaved person to their master (Museo Nazionale Romano)

What appears to be a distinctly Roman practice is the riveting of a "humiliating" metal slave collar around the former fugitive's neck. Because of the role the hope of manumission played in motivating the industry of slaves, the Romans may have preferred removable collars to permanent disfigurement, or for keeping open the possibility of resale.

Some forty-five examples of Roman slave collars have been documented, most found in Rome and central Italy, with three from cities in Roman North Africa. All date from the Christian era of the 4th and 5th centuries, (Note: Some collars have been lost after being documented in the early modern era.) and some have the Christian chi-rho symbol or a palm frond. Some were found still on the necks of human skeletons or with remains, suggesting that the collars might be worn for life and not just as a temporary ID tag; others seem to have been removed, lost, or discarded. In circumference, they are about the same size as Roman neck shackles (see relief under "Enslavement of war captives"), tight enough to keep them from slipping over the head but not so tight as to restrict breathing.

Fugitive slave collars have been found in urban environments rather than settings for hard labor. One tag from Bulla Regia in Africa identifies the fugitive wearing it as a meretrix, a wage-earning prostitute. The tags are typically inscribed with the owner's name, status, and occupation, and the "address" to which the slave should be returned. (Note: The owners range in rank from a linen manufacturer to a consul.) The most common instructional text is tene me ("hold me") with either ne fugiam ("so I don't run away") or quia fugi ("because I've run away"). The tag on the most intact example, the so-called Zoninus collar, reads: "I have escaped, catch me; when you return me to my master Zoninus, you'll receive a gold coin."

==== Crucifixion ====
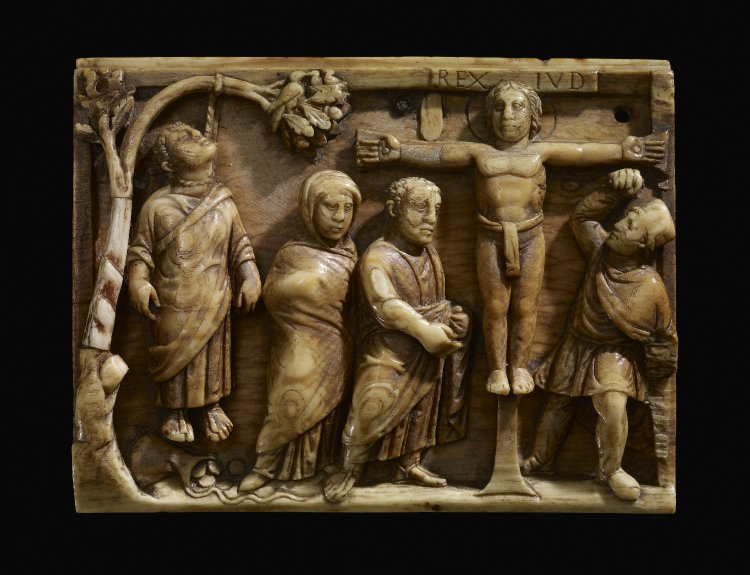
One of the earliest extant depictions (ca. AD 420–430) of the crucifixion of Jesus, on an ivory carving that also shows the suicide of Judas: the crucified Christ is serenely detached from the suffering of torture and defiantly alive on a dead tree, while Judas hangs dead on a living tree (British Museum)

Crucifixion was the capital punishment meted out specifically to slaves, traitors, and bandits. Crucifixion is rarely mentioned among the Greeks. and the Romans said that they had learned the technique from the Carthaginians during the Punic Wars. The earliest crucifixion among the Romans definitively described as such dates to 217 BC and was inflicted on rebellious slaves; Hannibal had crucified an Italian serving as his guide only a few weeks before, and several previous crucifixions by the Carthaginians were known to the Greeks and Romans. The few mentions of what might be construed as Roman crucifixion before that time are more likely to have been archaic punishments such as being bound to a stake and flogged, or being suspended from a tree (perhaps an arbor infelix) or furca and beaten to death. Curse tablets urging the hated person to commit suicide by hanging use language that overlaps with some details of crucifixion.

From its early use at a time when citizens were infrequently sentenced to death, crucifixion became the servile supplicium, reserved for slaves during the Republican era, and the worst punishment that could be inflicted on a slave. Crucifying Roman citizens is one of Cicero's most vehement accusations in the prosecution of Verres as a corrupt governor of Sicily.

An inscription from the late 1st century BC documents a law at Puteoli that made the services of an executioner available to private citizens who had decided to crucify a slave. The law specifies that the patibulum, generally taken as another term for the cross (crux), will be carried to the site of execution, probably by the slave to be executed, (Note: The text of the inscription is not entirely clear on this point, but references in Plautus make the slave as the bearer of the cross the more likely reading. The patibulum may be only the crossbar that distinguishes a cross from the stake.) who will also be scourged before affixed to it. Advertisements for gladiatorial games sometimes promoted crucifixions as part of the spectacle, presumably as a prelude to beast-baiting or burning at the stake, since it was a notoriously slow and "static" way to die.

Although crucifixion under the Christian emperors abated, the Christian apologist Lactantius (d. ca. 325) still thought that runaway slaves should be whipped, chained, and even crucified.

=== Suicide ===
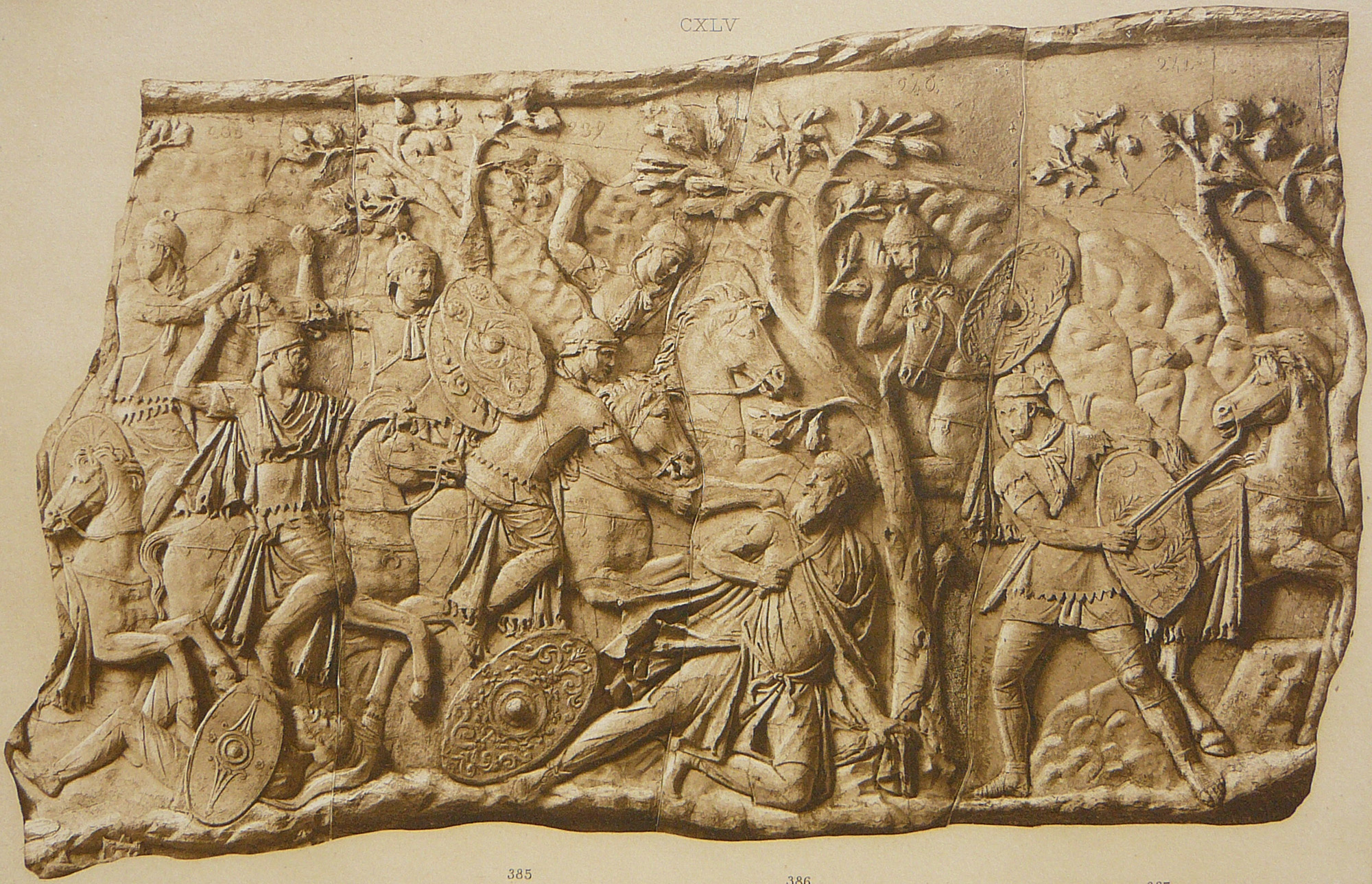
A relief from Trajan's Column shows the defeated Dacian king Decebalus surrounded by Roman cavalry and holding his sica to his throat, in the moment before he commits suicide to escape captivity (from the plates of Conrad Cichorius).

Reports of mass suicide or suicide by an individual to avoid enslavement or submission as a result of war are not rare in the Roman world. In one incident, a group of captive Germanic women told Caracalla that they would rather be executed than enslaved. When he ordered them sold anyway, they committed suicide en masse, some of them first killing their children.

Such an act could be considered honorable or rational in antiquity, and a slave might commit suicide for the same reasons a free person would, such as an agonizing health condition, religious fanaticism, or mental health crisis. But suicide among the enslaved might also be the ultimate way to resist and escape the master's control or abuse. One of Cato's slaves was so distraught after doing something he thought his master would disapprove of that he killed himself. An inscription from Moguntiacum records the killing of a freedman by one of his slaves, who then committed suicide by drowning himself in a river.

Roman law recognized that slaves might be driven to suicidal despair. A suicide attempt was one of the pieces of information about a slave that had to be disclosed on a bill of sale, indicating that such attempts occurred often enough to be of concern. However, the law did not always regard slaves as criminally fugitive if they ran away in despair and attempted suicide. The jurist Paulus wrote, "A slave acts to commit suicide when he seeks death out of wickedness or evil ways or because of some crime that he has committed, but not when he is able no longer to bear his bodily pain."

== Slavery and Roman religion ==
=== Slaves in classical Roman religion ===
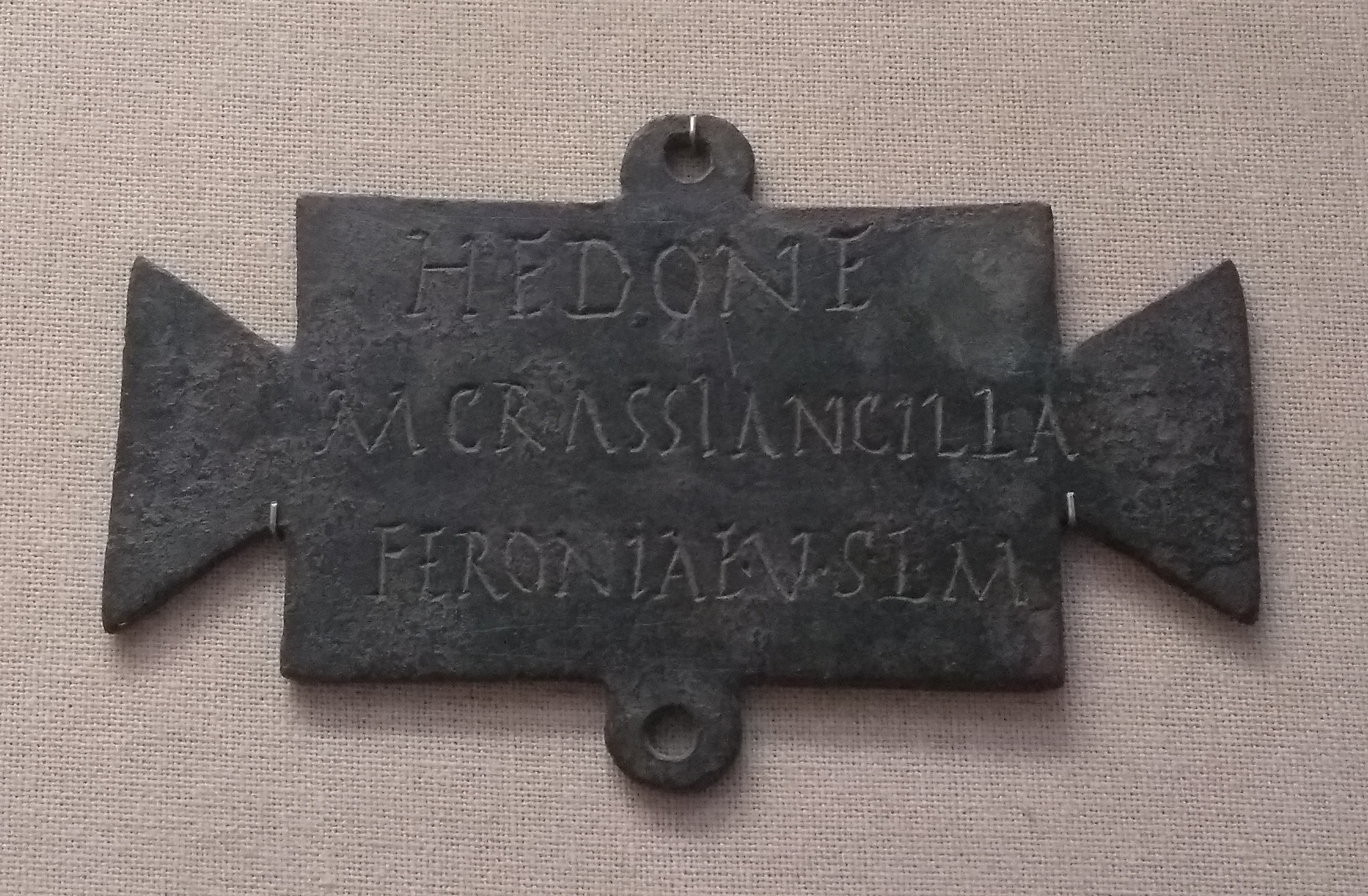
Bronze plaque recording the fulfillment of a vow to Feronia, a tutelary goddess of freedmen, by an ancilla named Hedone (CIL 6.147, 2nd century AD)

Religious practices attest to the presence of slaves in Roman society from the earliest period. The Matralia was a women's festival held June 11 in connection with the goddess Mater Matuta, whose temple was among Rome's oldest. According to tradition, it was established in the sixth century BC by the slave-born king Servius Tullius. The observance featured the ceremonial beating of a slave girl by free women, who brought her into the temple and then drove her from it. Slave women were otherwise forbidden from participation. It has been conjectured that this scapegoat ritual reflected the wives' anxiety about the introduction of slave girls into the household as sexual usurpers.

Another slaves' holiday (servorum dies festus) was held August 13 in honor of Servius Tullius himself. Like the Saturnalia, the holiday involved a role reversal: the matron of the household washed the heads of her slaves, as well as her own. Following the Matronalia on March 1, matrons gave slaves of their household a feast, a custom that also evokes Saturnalian role reversal. Each matron feasted her own slaves in her capacity as domina or slave mistress. Both Solinus and Macrobius see the feast as a way to manipulate obedience, indicating that physical compulsion was not the only technique for domination; social theory suggests that the communal meal also promotes household cohesion and norms by articulating the hierarchy through its temporary subversion. (Note: On social theory, Dolansky (2011) cites C. Grignon, "Commensality and Social Morphology: An Essay of Typology", in Food, Drink, and Identity, P. Scholliers, ed. (Oxford 2001), pp. 23–33, and Seneca, Epistle 47.14.)

The temple of Feronia at Terracina in Latium was the site of special ceremonies pertaining to manumission. The goddess was identified with Libertas, the personification of liberty, and was a tutelary goddess of freedmen (dea libertorum). A stone at her temple was inscribed "let deserving slaves sit down so that they may stand up free."

==== Saturnalia ====
The Roman festival most famously celebrated by slaves was the Saturnalia, a December observance of role reversals during which time slaves enjoyed a rich banquet, gambling, free speech and other forms of license not normally available to them. To mark their temporary freedom, they wore the pilleus, the cap of freedom, as did free citizens, who normally went about bareheaded. Some ancient sources suggest that master and slave dined together, while others indicate that the slaves feasted first, or that the masters actually served the food. The practice may have varied over time. Saturnalian license also permitted slaves to enjoy a pretense of disrespect for their masters, and exempted them from punishment. The Augustan poet Horace calls their freedom of speech "December liberty" (libertas Decembri).

==== Festival of Handmaids ====
Slave women were honored at the Ancillarum Feriae on July 7. (Note: The calendar of Polemius Silvius is the only one to record the holiday.) The holiday is explained as commemorating the service rendered to Rome by a group of ancillae (female slaves or "handmaids") during the war with the Fidenates in the late 4th century BC. Weakened by the Gallic sack of Rome in 390 BC, the Romans next had suffered a stinging defeat by the Fidenates, who demanded that they hand over their wives and virgin daughters as hostages to secure a peace. A handmaid named either Philotis or Tutula came up with a plan to deceive the enemy: the ancillae would put on the apparel of the free women, spend one night in the enemy camp, and send a signal to the Romans about the most advantageous time to launch a counterattack. Although the historicity of the underlying tale may be doubtful, it indicates that the Romans thought they had already had a significant slave population before the Punic Wars.

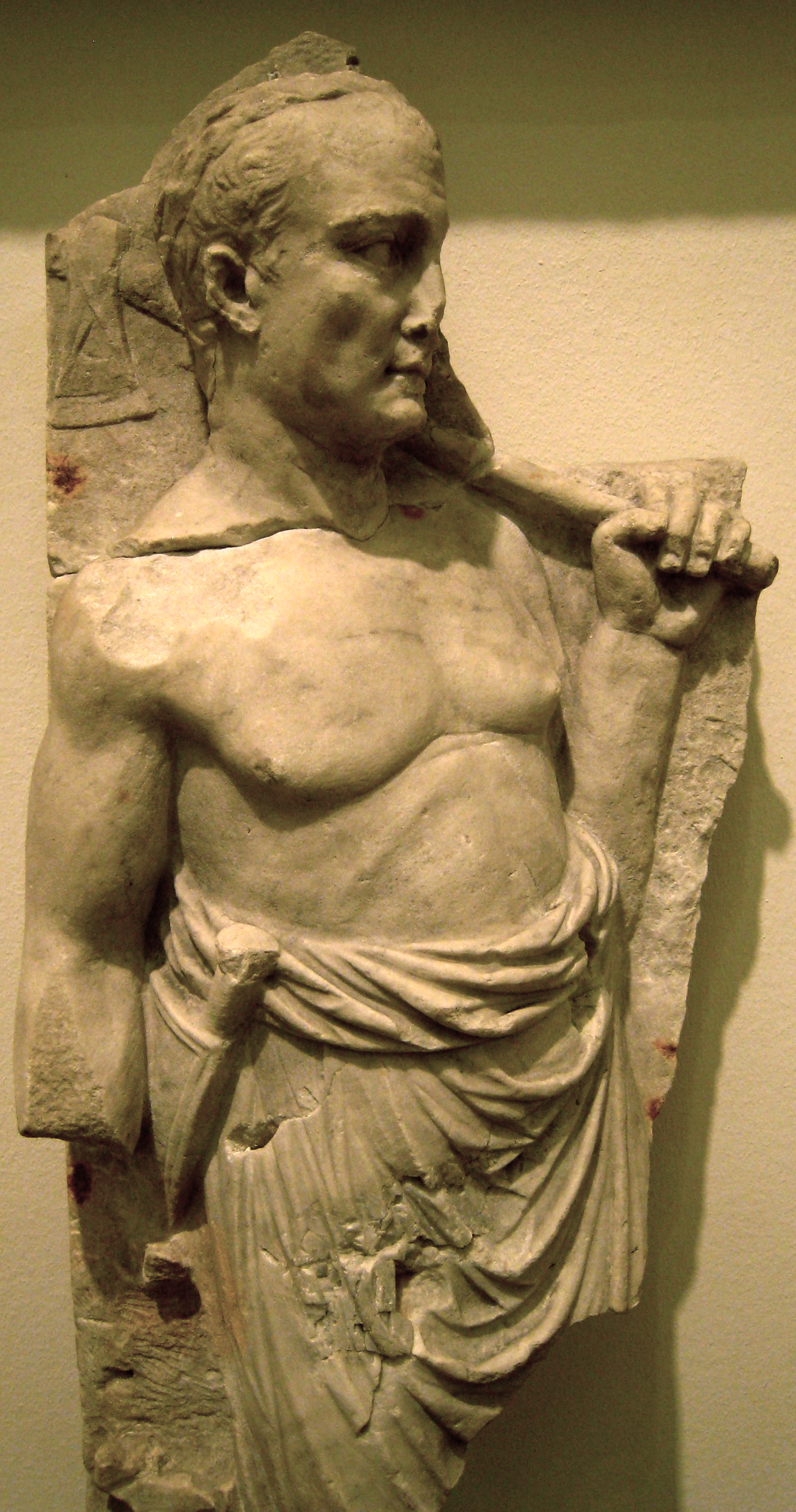
Attendant with ax at a sacrifice, a popa or victimarius (from Carthage, 50-150 AD)

=== Temple slaves ===
Among the public slaves (servi publici) were those who served Rome's traditional religious practices. The cult of Hercules at the Ara Maxima was transferred to the keeping of public slaves in 312 BC when the patrician families originally charged with its maintenance died out. (Note: These were the Potitia and the Pinaria gentes)

The calator was a public slave who assisted the flamens, the senior priests of the state, and carried out their day-to-day business. An epitaph records the career of a calator of the augurs who rose to the position after serving as a dispensator (keeper of accounts) for a senator; he had been manumitted before he died at the age of 32. The popa, depicted in sacrificial processions as carrying a mallet or axe with which to strike the sacrificial animal, is said in sources from late antiquity to have been a public slave.

In the East, especially during the first century BC, large numbers of "holy" slaves (Greek hierodouloi) served in temples such as those of Ma in Comana, Cappadocia, where 6,000 male and female slaves served, and of the Great Mother at Pessinus in Galatia. (Note: Also temples of a local Zeus in Morimene, Cappadocia; of the Men of Pharnaces at Cabeira; and of Anaitis at Zela (modern-day Zile, Turkey).) The notion that hierodouloi in the Roman era engaged in sacred prostitution is mostly a modern fantasy arising from the presence of prostitutes at temples and festivals, either as members of the participating community or peripherally plying their trade where potential customers would congregate. Temple slaves were not traded as chattel, and the Romans, given their instinct for religion as a source of social order, tended not to capitalize on them as such. Strabo states that the chief priest of the Temple of Ma at Comana did not have the right to sell hierodouloi; however, as the sites of such temples are often associated with trading centers, they might have played some role in facilitating the slave trade.

=== Mithraic cult ===
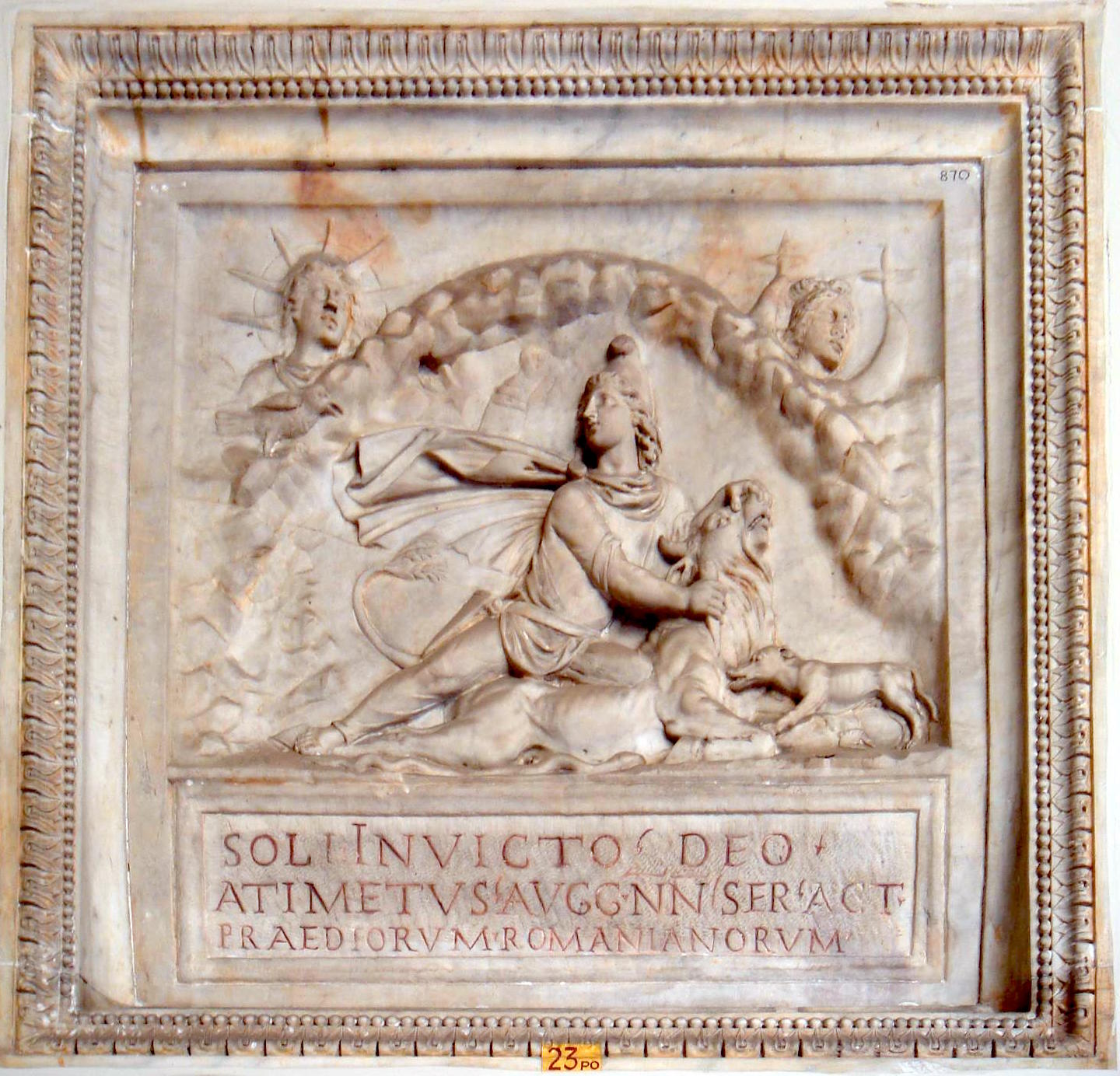
Dedication to Mithras by the Imperial slave Atimetus

The Mithraic mysteries were open to slaves and freedmen, and at some cult sites most or all votive offerings are made by slaves, sometimes for the sake of their masters' wellbeing. The slave Vitalis is known from three inscriptions involving the cult of Mithras at Apulum (Alba Iulia in present-day Romania). The best preserved is the dedication of an altar to Sol Invictus for the wellbeing of a free man, possibly his master or a fellow Mithraic initiate. Vitalis was an arcarius, a treasurer probably in the administration of imperial customs (portorium); his position gave him the opportunity to earn the wealth required for setting up stone monuments.

Numerous Mithraic inscriptions from the reaches of the empire record the names of both privately held slaves and imperial slaves, and even one Pylades in Roman Gaul who was the slave of an imperial slave. Mithraic cult, which valued submission to authority and promotion through a hierarchy, was in harmony with the structure of Roman society, and thus the participation of slaves posed no threat to social order.

=== Early Christian church ===
Christianity gave slaves an equal place within the religion, allowing them to participate in the liturgy. According to tradition, Pope Clement I (term c. 92–99), Pope Pius I (158–167), and Pope Callixtus I (c. 217–222) were former slaves.

== Commemoration ==
Epitaphs are one of the most common forms of Roman writing to survive, arising from the intersection of two salient activities of Roman culture: the care of the dead and what Ramsay MacMullen called the "epigraphic habit". One of the ways that Roman epitaphs differ from those of the Greeks is that the name of the commemorator is typically given along with that of the deceased. Commemorations are found both for slaves and by slaves.

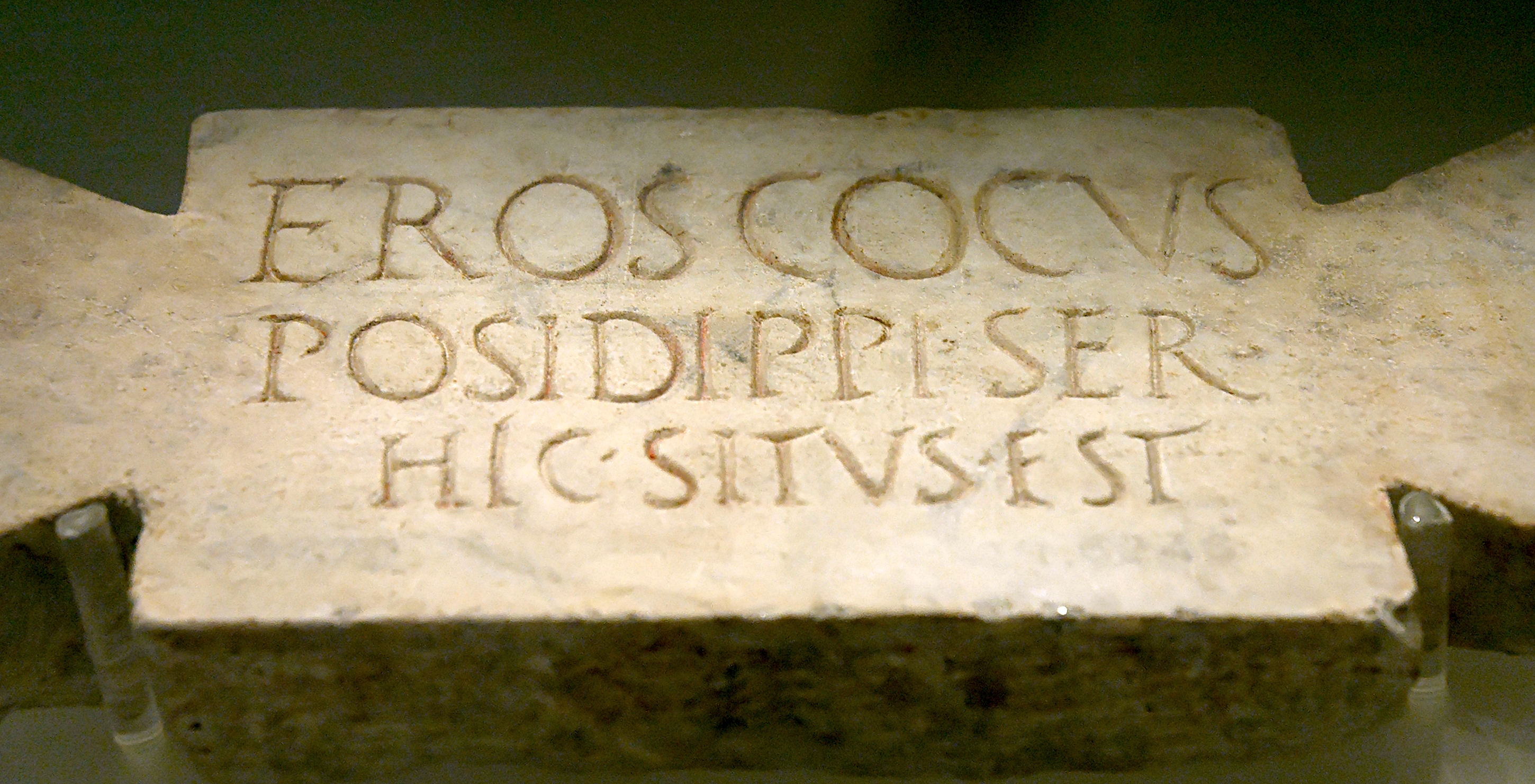
"Eros the cook, slave of Posidippus, lies here" (CIL VI, 6246)

Simple epitaphs for domestic slaves might be set up in the communal tomb of their household. This inclusion perpetuated the domus by enlarging the number of survivors and descendants who might carry out tomb maintenance and the many ritual observances for the dead on the Roman religious calendar.

The commemoration of slaves often included their job—cook, jeweler, hairdresser—or an emblem of their work such as tools. The funerary relief of the freed silversmith Publius Curtilius Agatho (see under "Names" above) shows him in the process of working a cup that lies incomplete by his left hand. He holds a hammer in his right hand, and a punch or graver in his left. Despite these realistic details of his craft, Agatho is depicted wearing a toga—which Getty Museum curator Kenneth Lapatin has compared to going to work in a tuxedo—that expresses his pride in his citizen status, just as the choice of marble as the medium rather than the more common limestone gives evidence of his level of success.

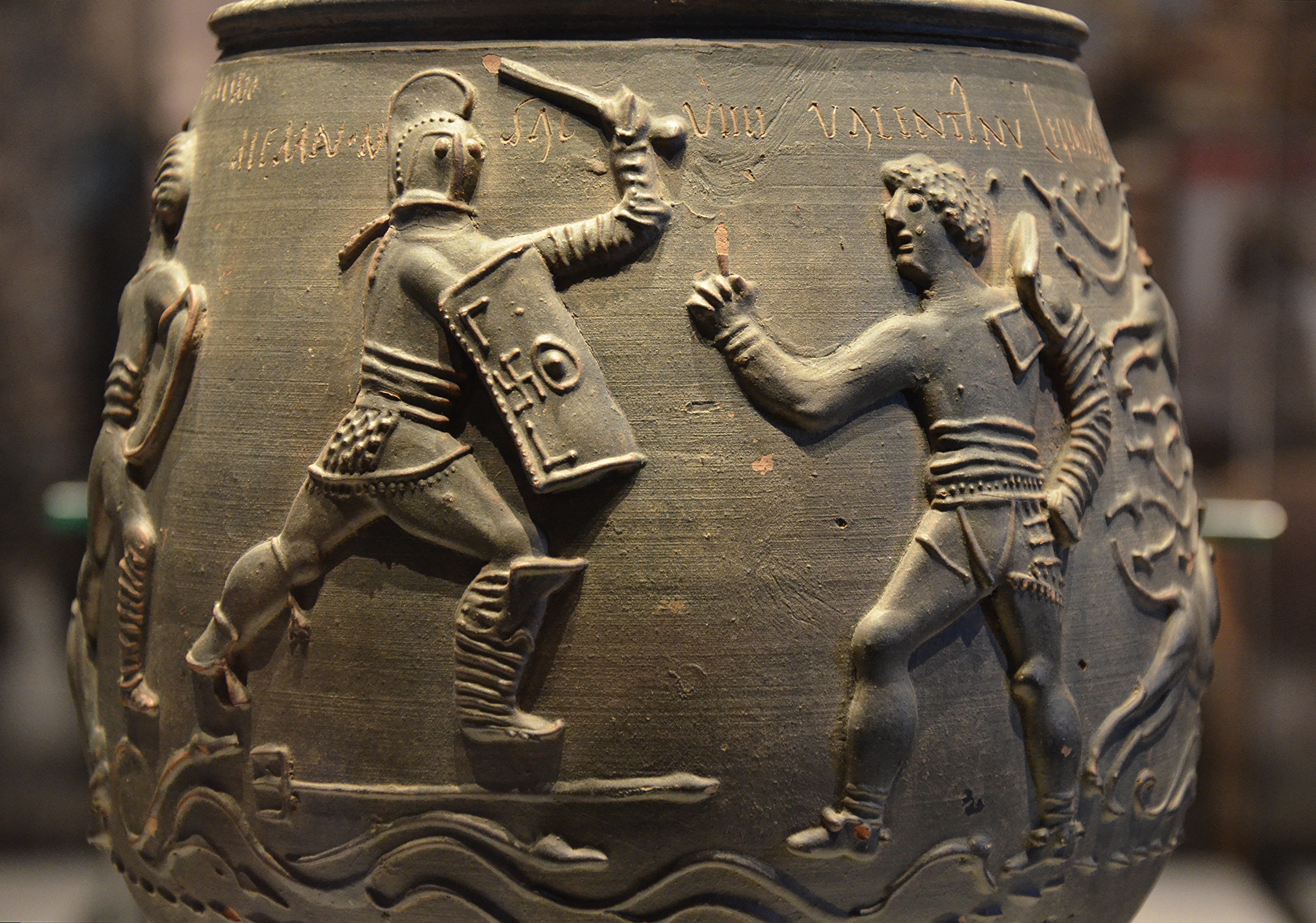
The Colchester Vase from Roman Britain (c. 175 AD) is inscribed around the top with the names of four gladiators; on this side, the murmillo Secundus fights the retiarius Marius.

Although not required on tombstones, the deceased's status at times can be identified by Latin abbreviations such as SER for a slave; VERN or VER specifically for vernae, slaves born into a familia (see funerary bust above); or LIB for a freedperson. This legal status is usually absent for gladiators, who were social outcasts regardless of having been freeborn, manumitted, or enslaved at the time of death; instead they were identified by their fighting specialty such as retiarius or murmillo or less often as a freeborn man, LIBER, a status which was not typically asserted. Gladiators who had become celebrities might also be remembered by fans (amatores) in popular media—images of gladiators, sometimes labeled by name, appeared widely on everyday items such as oil lamps and vessels.

Epitaphs represent only slaves who were more highly favored or esteemed within their household or who belonged to communities or social organizations (such as collegia) that offered care of the dead. With the permission of their master, slaves could join burial societies along with free people of modest means and freed slaves who pooled their resources to ensure decent entombment and commemoration. Most slaves did not have the opportunity to develop a personal relationship with a free person or participate in social networking and were disposed of in mass graves along with "free" people who were destitute. The Augustan poet Horace, himself the son of a freedman, wrote of "a fellow slave contracted to transport the castaway corpses to narrow rooms on a cheap chest; here lay the common grave of the wretched masses."

Although slaves were denied the right to make contracts or conduct other legal matters in their own name, it was possible for a master to allow his slave to make less formal arrangements that functioned like a will.

== Slavery and Roman morality ==
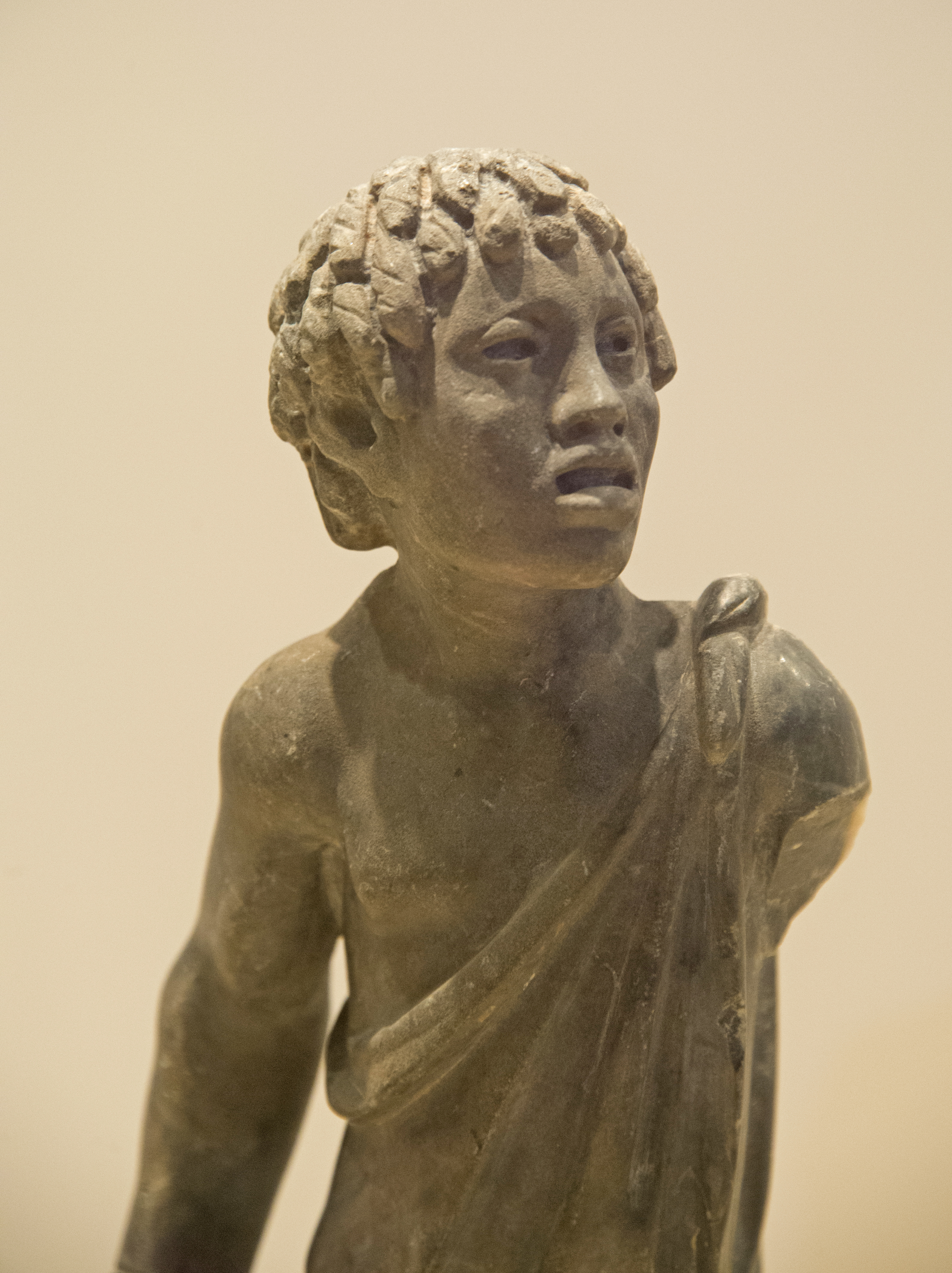
Statuette of a slave from the Bursa Archaeological Museum

Slavery as an institution was practiced within every community of the Greco-Roman world, including Jewish and Christian communities. Some Jewish sects, such as the Essenes and Therapeutae, did articulate anti-slavery principles—which is one of the things that "made them look like fringe utopians" for their time. Both literary and juristic texts in Latin invoke humanitas as a principle in relations with slaves, a virtue that broadly encompasses the quality of living as a fully realized human being, and Pliny asserts that a master whose treatment of slaves is based only on economic considerations is not fully human.

The apparent ease of manumission, along with some Roman laws and practices that mitigated slavery, has led some scholars to view Roman slavery as a more benign institution, or at least a more open system, than the race-based Atlantic slave trade. The majority of slaves suffered in grinding toil but are mostly silent and undifferentiated in ancient sources, while the freedmen and imperial slaves who enjoyed social mobility are represented because of their success: "the ideology of slaveowning had been successfully transmitted to those who had once been its victims."

The Roman concept of the virtues and what it meant to be moral was not founded on the value of an individual life and preserving it, regardless of the social status of that life. In early Rome as the Twelve Tables were being formulated, murder was regarded as a pollution of the community that had to be expiated. Killing an individual was sanctioned when doing so removed a threat from the community, as in war and for capital punishment; homicide was not a statutory offense under Roman law until 80 BC. "'Life', taken as individual existence, is not significant", Jörg Rüpke has observed of Roman morality. "It is important only instrumentally."

The value of the life of a slave differed from that of a conquering general in the nature of this instrumentality: the murder of a slave—a "speaking tool" (instrumentum vocale), in the words of Varro—under law was property loss to the owner. And yet in the Satyricon, Petronius has Trimalchio assert that "slaves too are men. The milk they have drunk is just the same even if an evil fate has oppressed them." When the jurists argue for resolution of legal issues in favor of slaves, they draw on a Roman vocabulary of moral duty (pietas), decency (pudor), respect (reverentia), traditional morals (mores maiorum), and the need for kindliness (benignitas) to prevent duritia, a hardening of the heart. The many, sometimes inadvertent acknowledgments of the slave's humanity in Roman literature and law; the individual expressions of esteem or affection toward a slave by an owner; and pleas for the humanitarian treatment of slaves particularly among Stoics all produce a dissonance. within a moral framework largely dependent on utilitarianism or at best "enlightened self-interest".

In his book Ideas of Slavery from Aristotle to Augustine, Peter Garnsey outlines six moral views that express various and inconsistent "anxieties and tensions" inherent in slavery throughout Classical antiquity in Greek, Roman, Jewish, and Christian thought:

1. Slavery is natural, a normative view most notoriously expressed by Aristotle.
2. Slavery can be justified for its utility— culturally, the most "numerous and authoritative" of the views expressed.
3. Slavery is an evil and should be condemned as an institution—"few and isolated" voices not to be construed as an abolitionist movement.
4. The institution of slavery can be abused, and these abuses, such as the wrongful enslavement of free people, can be criticized and corrected.
5. Slaves are human beings worthy of humane regard.
6. There is an obligation to improve the conditions under which slaves live.

=== Stoic philosophy ===
The Stoic affirmation of universal human dignity extended to slaves and women. Cicero, who had some Stoic inclinations, did not think that slaves were by nature inferior. Because human dignity was inherent, it could not be affected by external circumstances such as enslavement or poverty. The individual's dignity could be damaged, however, by a lack of self-governance. Anger and cruelty damaged the person who felt them, and therefore a slave owner ought to exercise clementia, mildness or mercy, toward those who were slaves by law. But since emotion-based compassion was likewise a response to external conditions, it was not grounds for political action—true freedom was wisdom, and true slavery the lack thereof. By denying that material and institutional conditions for human flourishing mattered, Stoics had no impulse toward abolition and were limited to seeing the institution of slavery as, in the words of Martha Nussbaum, "no big deal". From a philosophical perspective, what mattered was the conduct of the individual owner, not the reform of legal institutions.

One of the major Roman-era Stoic philosophers, Epictetus, spent his youth as a slave.

=== Epicurean philosophy ===
The Epicureans admitted enslaved people to their philosophical circles and, like the Stoics, rejected the Aristotelian view that some people were destined by nature to be slaves. In Epicurean terms, slavery was an eventum, an accident that might befall a person, not a coniunctum, something inseparable from a person's nature. But Epicureans never advocated for abolition, and again like the Stoics and other philosophical schools, they spoke of slavery most often as a metaphor, specifically the moral state of "enslavement" to custom or other psychological ills.

The Epicurean poet and philosopher Philodemus (1st century BC) wrote a treatise On Anger in which he admonishes masters not to impede their moral progress by directing violence or inhumane or indecent acts against slaves; he attributes violent rebellion among slaves to the injustices perpetrated by their masters. In the treatise On Property Management, Philodemus proposes that slaves should receive moral instruction, recognizing them as capable of learning and of acting as moral agents. A good property manager should show mildness of character, sensitivity, philanthropy, and decency towards slaves and all subordinates, whereas the wealth-obsessed manager will not refrain from exploiting slave labor in the mines. It is not shameful, however, to earn income from property, and that includes slaves if they are employing their skills or arts in ways that are appropriate to them and do not require "excessive toil" from anyone.

=== Early Christian attitudes toward slavery ===
Roman Christians preached that slaves were human beings and not things (res), but while slaves were regarded as human beings with souls that needed to be saved, Jesus of Nazareth said nothing toward abolishing slavery, nor were religionists of the faith admonished against owning slaves in the first two centuries of Christianity's existence. The parables of Jesus that refer in English translations to "servants" are in fact about slaves (Greek douloi), and the "faithful parabolic slave" is rewarded with greater responsibilities, not manumission.

There is little evidence that Christian theologians of the Roman Imperial era problematized slavery as morally indefensible. Certain senior Christian leaders (such as Gregory of Nyssa and John Chrysostom) called for good treatment for slaves and condemned slavery, while others supported it. That Christians might be susceptible to accusations of hypocrisy from outside the faith was anticipated in Christian apologetics, such as Lactantius's defense that both slave and free were inherently equal before God. Salvian, a Christian monk writing polemic for Christian slaveowners in Gaul around AD 440, wrote that kindly treatment could be a more effective way of obtaining obedience than physical punishment, but he still regarded slaves as 'wicked and worthy of our contempt', and he never imagined a social system without slavery. Saint Augustine, who came from an aristocratic background and likely grew up in a home where slave labor was utilized, described slavery as being against God's intention and resulting from sin.

=== Sexual ethics and attitudes ===
Because slaves were regarded as property under Roman law, the slaveholder had license to use them for sex or to hire them out to service other people. While sexual attitudes differed substantially among the Jewish community, up to the 2nd century AD it was still assumed that male slaveholders would have sexual access to female slaves within their own household, an assumption not subjected to Christian criticism in the New Testament, though the use of prostitutes was prohibited. Salvian (5th century AD) condemned the immorality of his audience in regarding their female slaves as natural outlets for their sexual appetites, exactly as "pagan" masters had done in the time of Martial.

Traditional Roman morality had some moderating influence, and upper-class slaveholders who exploited their familia for sex were criticized if this use became known as indiscreet or excessive. Social censure was not so much indignation at the owner's abuse of the slave as disdain for his lack of self-mastery. It reflected poorly on an upper-class male to resort sexually to a female slave of his household, but a right to consent or refuse did not exist for her. The treatment of slaves and their own conduct within the elite domus contributed to the perception of the household's respectability. The materfamilias in particular was judged by her female slaves' sexual behavior, which was expected to be moral or at least discreet; as domina, she had the right to exercise control over sexual access to female slaves who were her property. (Note: Gaca's argument is not primarily based on property rights but on the idea that rape would be an imposition of the military sphere on the domus.) This decorum may have helped alleviate the sexual exploitation of ancillae within the household, along with men having easy, even ubiquitous access outside the home to legal, inexpensive, and often highly specialized services from professional sex workers.

"Not one single surviving legal text refers in any way whatever to sexual abuse of slave children", states legal historian Alan Watson, presumably because no special protections were afforded by law to child slaves. Some household staff, such as cup-bearers for dinner parties, generally boys, were chosen at a young age for their grace and good looks, qualities that were cultivated, sometimes through formal training, to convey sexual allure and potential use by guests.

A slave's own expressions of sexuality were closely controlled. An estate owner usually restricted the heterosexual activities of his male slaves to females he also owned; any children born from these unions added to his wealth. Because home-reared slaves were valued, female slaves on an estate were encouraged to have children with approved male partners. There is little or no evidence that estate owners bought women for the purpose of "breeding", since the useful proportion of male to female slaves was constrained by the fewer number of tasks for which women were employed.

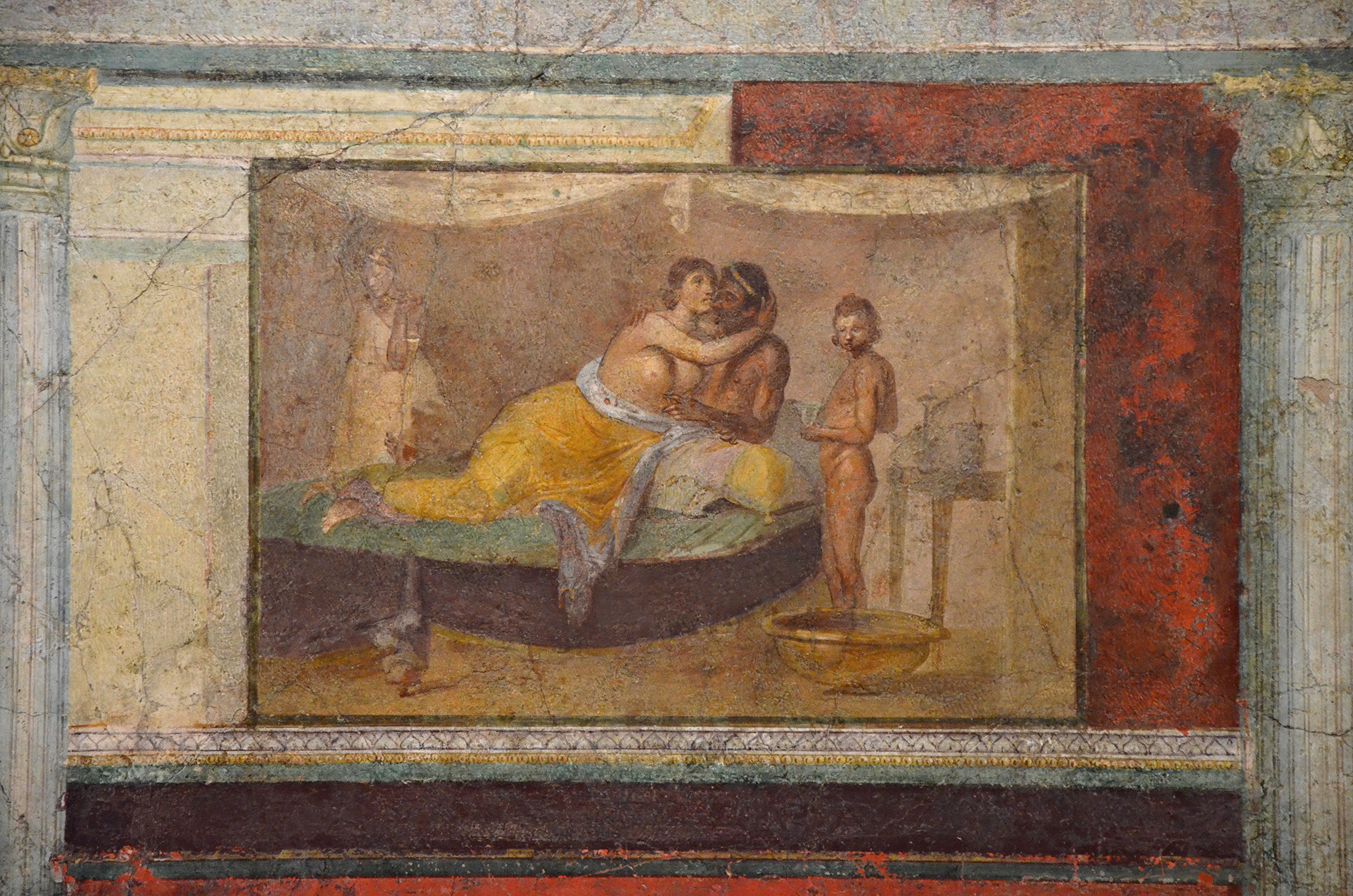
Two slaves stand by as a bride awakens to sexuality on her wedding night, in a bedroom fresco from the Casa della Farnesina, Trastevere.

Despite the controls and restrictions placed on a slave's sexuality, Roman art and literature often perversely portray slaves as lascivious, voyeuristic, and sexually knowing, indicating a deep ambivalence about master-slave relations. Roman art connoisseurs did not shy away from displaying explicit sexuality in their collections at home, but when figures identifiable as slaves appear in erotic paintings within a domestic scenario, they are either hovering in the background or performing routine peripheral tasks, not engaging in sex.

However, most prostitutes were slaves or freedwomen. Sexual services were cheap enough that urban male slaves, unlike their rural counterparts, could frequent brothels to seek gratification, just as upper-class men did, making the lupanar one of the most egalitarian facilities among men in Roman society. Like slavery, prostitution was a legal way to use a human body other than one's own—and in both cases a use that a free person was to resist absolutely in the name of liberty.

The dynamics of Roman phallocentric sex were such that an adult male was free to enjoy same-sex relations without compromising his perceived virility as long as he took the active (penetrating) role. But as any freeborn man or boy taking the passive role was at risk of losing prestige and status, men often had to limit their passive male sexual partners, whatever the desired age, to prostitutes or slaves. The Imperial poet Martial describes a specialized market to meet this demand, located at the Julian Saepta in the Campus Martius. Seneca expressed Stoic indignation that a male slave should be groomed effeminately and used sexually, because a slave's human dignity should not be debased. Eunuchs castrated under the age of ten were rare and as expensive as a skilled artisan. The trade in eunuch slaves during the reign of Hadrian prompted legislation prohibiting the castration of a slave against his will "for lust or gain".

The contract when a female slave was sold might include a ne serva prostituatur covenant that prohibited exploiting her as a prostitute. This covenant, probably rarely used, seems to have been chiefly intended to protect the honor of the seller by preventing a female slave formerly attached to his household from being forced into prostitution. From the second half of the second century onward, however, jurists such as Papinian also began to recognize the interest of the enslaved woman sold under such a covenant in avoiding that injury—a rare exception, since slaves were otherwise usually treated as having no honor of their own. The covenant could include a clause stating that the slave woman would be freed if it was violated, and at least in some cases violations of such a clause did indeed lead to her freedom, even when a later buyer had apparently not known that she had previously been sold under that condition.

While no law prohibited an owner from exploiting his own slaves sexually, no one was entitled to compel slaves owned by others to have sex without the owner's consent. Doing so could often be treated as a form of theft, since owners generally retained full rights over their slaves, including control of their sexuality. If a free man did force himself on someone else's slave for sex, he could not be charged with rape because the slave lacked legal personhood. But if a slave was sexually violated against the owner's will, the owner could in many cases press charges for iniuria or similar laws meant to protect property—what counted was "the master's interest in the sexual integrity of the slave, not the injury to the slave". If masters prostituted their slaves or otherwise notably relinquished their interest in the slaves' chastity, this interest was considered forfeited, meaning that acts of unauthorized sex with a prostituted slave were usually not prosecuted even at the owner's request.

== In Latin and Imperial Greek literature ==
Slaves appear widely in genres of Roman literature written mostly by or for the elite, including history, letters, drama, satire, and prose narrative. These expressions may have served to navigate master-slave relationships in terms of slaves' behavior and punishment. Literary examples often focus on extreme cases, such as the crucifixion of hundreds of slaves for the murder of their master, and while such instances are exceptional, the underlying problems must have concerned the authors and audiences.

Lost works thought to have been written by slaves or former slaves include a history of the Sicilian slave rebellions by Caecilius of Calacte and a biographical collection by Hermippos of Berytus on slaves celebrated for their learning.

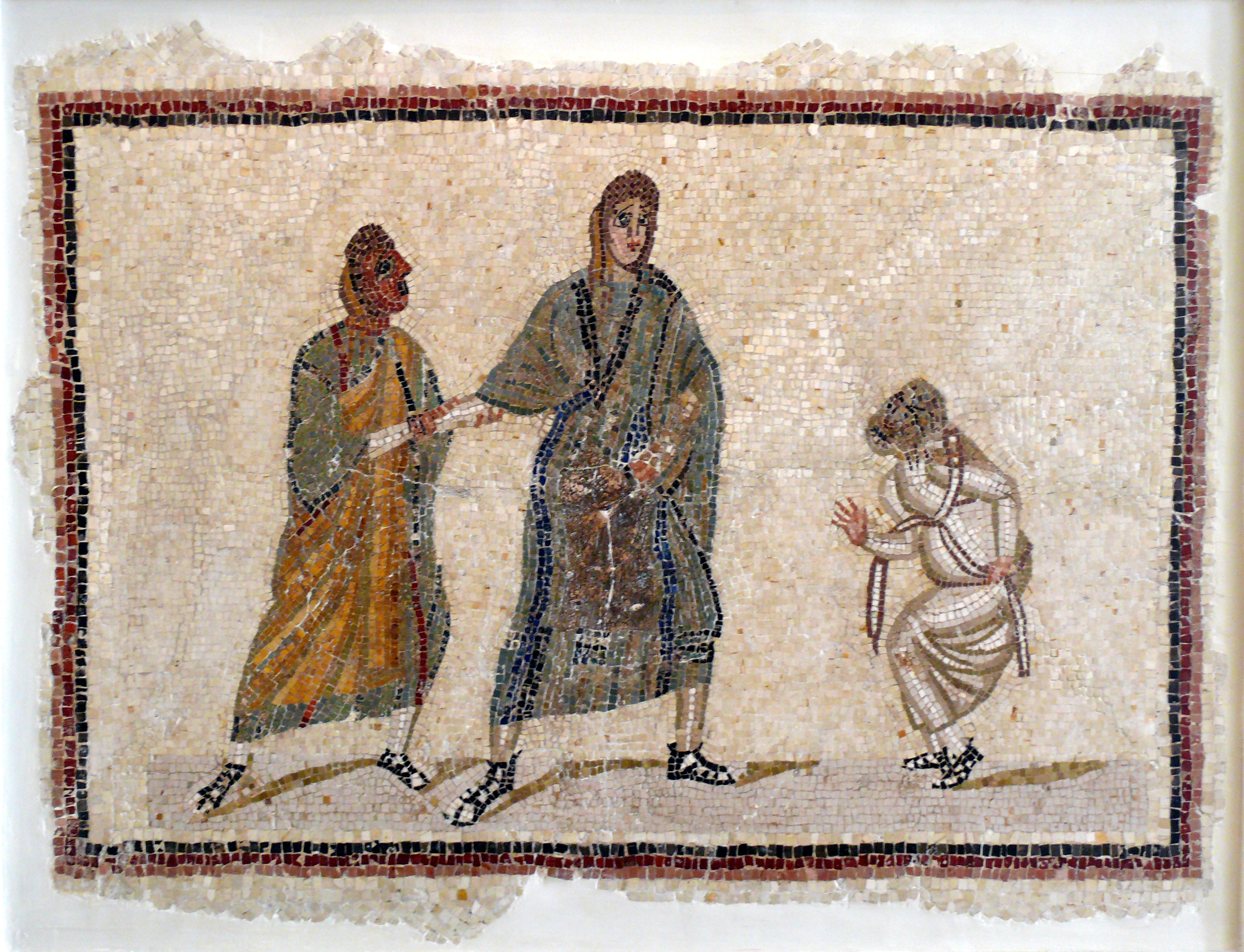
Mosaic depicting a scene from a Roman comedy, with the slave in chains (Tunisia, 3rd century AD)

=== Roman comedy ===
Slaves are depicted ubiquitously in the Roman comedies of Plautus and Terence. In Roman comedy, servi or slaves make up the majority of the stock characters, and generally fall into two basic categories: loyal slaves and tricksters. Loyal slaves often help their master in their plan to woo or obtain a lover—the most popular driver of plot in Roman comedy. Slaves are often dim, timid, and worried about what punishments may befall them.

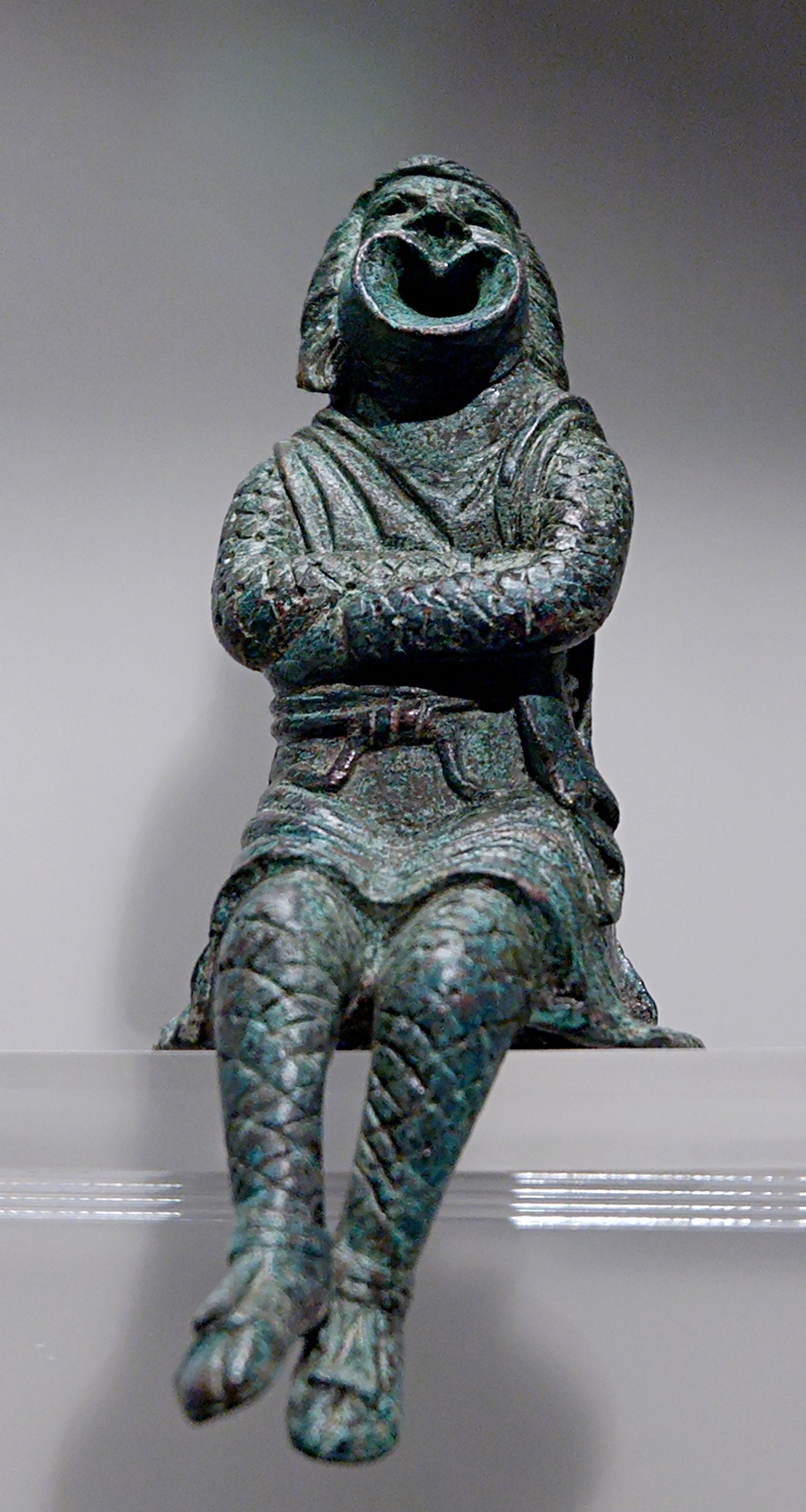
Bronze figurine of an actor wearing a comic mask and portraying a slave (3rd century AD)

Trickster slaves are more numerous and often use their masters' unfortunate situation to create a "topsy-turvy" world in which they are the masters and their masters are subservient to them. The master will often ask the slave for a favor and the slave only complies once the master has made it clear that the slave is in charge, beseeching him and calling him lord, sometimes even a god. These slaves are threatened with numerous punishments for their treachery, but always escape the fulfillment of these threats through their wit.

Plautus' plays represent slavery "as a complex institution that raised perplexing problems in human relationships involving masters and slaves".

Terence added a new element to how slaves were portrayed in his plays, due to his personal background as a former slave. In the work Andria, slaves are central to the plot. Many times throughout the play, slaves are allowed to engage in activity, such as the inner and personal lives of their owners, that would not normally be seen with slaves in every day society. This is a form of satire by Terence due to the unrealistic nature of events that occurs between slaves and citizens in his plays.

== See also ==
- Slavery in ancient Greece
- Slavery in antiquity
- History of slavery
- Slavery in the Eastern Roman Empire
- Victimarius

== Notes ==
=== Works cited ===
- Augustine of Hippo (2015). The Letters of St. Augustine. Jazzybee Verlag. ISBN 978-3-8496-9286-5.
- Bankston, Zach (2012). "Administrative Slavery in the Ancient Roman Republic: The Value of Marcus Tullius Tiro in Ciceronian Rhetoric". Rhetoric Review. 31 (3): 203–218. doi:10.1080/07350198.2012.683991. S2CID 145385697.
- Barton, Carlin A. (1993). The Sorrows of the Ancient Romans: The Gladiator and the Monster. Princeton University Press. ISBN 978-0-691-05696-8.
- Bederman, David J. (5 March 2001). International Law in Antiquity. Cambridge University Press. ISBN 978-0-521-79197-7.
- Beek, Aaron L. (2016). "The Pirate Connection: Roman Politics, Servile Wars, and the East". Transactions of the American Philological Association. 146 (1): 99–116. ISSN 2575-7180. JSTOR 26401804.
- Berger, Adolf (1953). "Encyclopedic Dictionary of Roman Law". Transactions of the American Philosophical Society. 43 (2): 624, 706. doi:10.2307/1005773. ISSN 0065-9746. JSTOR 1005773. OCLC 522130.
- Bosworth, A. B. (2002). "Vespasian and the Slave Trade". The Classical Quarterly. 52 (1): 350–357. doi:10.1093/cq/52.1.350. ISSN 0009-8388. JSTOR 3556462.
- Bradley, Keith R. (1983). "Slave Kingdoms and Slave Rebellions in Ancient Sicily". Historical Reflections / Réflexions Historiques. 10 (3). Berghahn Books: 435–451. ISSN 0315-7997. JSTOR 41292832.
- Bradley, Keith R. (1985a). "Child Labour in the Roman World". Historical Reflections / Réflexions Historiques. 12 (2): 311–330. ISSN 0315-7997. JSTOR 41298859.
- Bradley, Keith R. (1987). "On the Roman Slave Supply and Slavebreeding". In Moses I. Finley (ed.). Classical Slavery (1st ed.). Routledge. pp. 53–81. doi:10.4324/9781315810270. ISBN 978-0714643892.
- Bradley, Keith R. (1988). "Roman Slavery and Roman Law". Historical Reflections / Réflexions Historiques. 15 (3): 477–495. ISSN 0315-7997. JSTOR 23232665.
- Bradley, Keith (December 1991 – January 1992). "'The Regular, Daily Traffic in Slaves': Roman History and Contemporary History". The Classical Journal. 87 (2): 125–138. JSTOR 3297968.
- Bradley, Keith R. (13 October 1994). Slavery and Society at Rome. Cambridge University Press. ISBN 978-0-521-37887-1.
- Bradley, Keith (July 1997). "Review Article: The Problem of Slavery in Classical Culture". Classical Philology. 92 (3): 273–282. doi:10.1086/449356.
- Bradley, Keith (November 2000). "Animalizing the Slave: the Truth of Fiction". The Journal of Roman Studies. 90: 110–125. doi:10.2307/300203. ISSN 1753-528X. JSTOR 300203.
- Bradley, Keith (2004). "On Captives under the Principate". Phoenix. 58 (3/4): 298–318. doi:10.2307/4135171. ISSN 0031-8299. JSTOR 4135171.
- Bradley, Keith; Cartledge, Paul, eds. (2011). The Cambridge World History of Slavery. Vol. 1, The Ancient Mediterranean World. Cambridge University Press. doi:10.1017/CHOL9780521840668. ISBN 978-0511780349.
  - Bradley, Keith; Cartledge, Paul. Introduction. In Bradley & Cartledge (2011), p. 3.
- Cantarella, Eva (2002). Bisexuality in the Ancient World. Yale University Press. ISBN 978-0-300-09302-5.
- Cheesman, Clive (1 December 2009). "Names in -por and Slave Naming in Republican Rome" (PDF). The Classical Quarterly. 59 (2): 511–531. doi:10.1017/S0009838809990152. ISSN 0009-8388. JSTOR 20616703. OCLC 9970879337.
- Clarke, John R. (16 April 2001). Looking at Lovemaking: Constructions of Sexuality in Roman Art, 100 B.C. – A.D. 250. University of California Press. ISBN 978-0-520-22904-4.
- Clauss, Manfred; Gordon, Richard (2000). The Roman Cult of Mithras: The God and His Mysteries. Edinburgh University Press. ISBN 978-0-7486-1396-0. JSTOR 10.3366/j.ctvxcrrjd.
- Cook, John Granger (2008). "Envisioning Crucifixion: Light from Several Inscriptions and the Palatine Graffito". Novum Testamentum. 50 (3): 262–285. doi:10.1163/156853608X262918. ISSN 0048-1009. JSTOR 25442603.
- Coulston, Jon (2013). "Courage and Cowardice in the Roman Imperial Army". War in History. 20 (1): 7–31. doi:10.1177/0968344512454518. ISSN 0968-3445. JSTOR 26098641.
- Croom, Alexandra (15 September 2010). Roman Clothing and Fashion. Amberley Publishing Limited. ISBN 978-1-4456-1244-7.
- Dolansky, Fanny (2010). "Celebrating the Saturnalia: religious ritual and Roman domestic life". In Beryl Rawson (ed.). A Companion to Families in the Greek and Roman Worlds. Oxford, UK: Wiley-Blackwell. pp. 488–503. doi:10.1002/9781444390766.ch29. ISBN 978-1-4051-8767-1.
- Dolansky, Fanny (2011). "Reconsidering the Matronalia and Women's Rites". Classical World. 104 (2): 191–209. ISSN 0009-8418. JSTOR 25799995.
- Edwards, Catharine (6 October 2020). "Unspeakable Professions: Public Performance and Prostitution in Ancient Rome". In Judith P. Hallett]; Marilyn B. Skinner (eds.). Roman Sexualities. Princeton University Press. pp. 66–96. doi:10.1515/9780691219547-005. ISBN 978-0-691-21954-7.
- Flemming, Rebecca (1999). "Quae Corpore Quaestum Facit: The Sexual Economy of Female Prostitution in the Roman Empire". The Journal of Roman Studies. 89: 38–61. doi:10.2307/300733. ISSN 0075-4358. JSTOR 300733.
- Forbes, Clarence A. (1955). "Supplementary Paper: The Education and Training of Slaves in Antiquity". Transactions and Proceedings of the American Philological Association. 86. Johns Hopkins University Press: 321–360. doi:10.2307/283628. ISSN 0065-9711. JSTOR 283628. OCLC 5548698284.
- Fuhrmann, Christopher J. (12 January 2012). Policing the Roman Empire: Soldiers, Administration, and Public Order. USA: Oxford University Press. ISBN 978-0-19-973784-0.
- Garnsey, Peter (1996). Ideas of Slavery from Aristotle to Augustine. Cambridge University Press. ISBN 978-0521574334.
- Johnston, David (12 May 2022). Roman Law in Context. Cambridge University Press. ISBN 978-1-108-47630-0.
- Joshel, Sandra R. (16 August 2010). Slavery in the Roman World. Cambridge University Press. ISBN 978-0-521-53501-4.
- Gaca, Kathy (29 June 2021). "Controlling Female Slave Sexuality and Men's War-Driven Sexual Desire". In Kamen, Deborah; Marshall, C. W. (eds.). Slavery and Sexuality in Classical Antiquity. University of Wisconsin Pres. ISBN 978-0-299-33190-0.
- Gamauf, Richard (2009). "Slaves Doing Business: The role of Roman Law in the Economy of a Roman Household". European Review of History. 16 (3): 331–346. doi:10.1080/13507480902916837. S2CID 145609520.
- George, Michele (2013) [2002]. "Slave Disguise". Representing the Body of the Slave. Routledge.
- Goldhill, Simon (7 June 2001). Being Greek Under Rome: Cultural Identity, the Second Sophistic and the Development of Empire. Cambridge University Press. ISBN 978-0-521-66317-5.
- Goodwin, Stefan (2009). Africa in Europe, Volume One: Antiquity into the Age of Global Exploration. Lexington Books. ISBN 978-0-7391-1726-2.
- Gruen, Erich S. (1974). The Last Generation of the Roman Republic. University of California Press. ISBN 978-0-520-02238-6.
- Harper, Kyle (12 May 2011). Slavery in the Late Roman World, AD 275–425. Cambridge University Press. ISBN 978-1-139-50406-5.
- Harris, William V. (1980). "Towards a Study of the Roman Slave Trade". Memoirs of the American Academy in Rome. 36: 117–140. doi:10.2307/4238700. ISSN 0065-6801. JSTOR 4238700.
- Harris, William V. (1980b). "Roman Terracotta Lamps: The Organization of an Industry". Journal of Roman Studies (70).
- Harris, William V. (1994). "Child-Exposure in the Roman Empire". The Journal of Roman Studies. 84. Cambridge University Press: Society for the Promotion of Roman Studies: 2, 18. doi:10.2307/300867. ISSN 0075-4358. JSTOR 300867. OCLC 997453470. S2CID 161878092.
- Hezser, Catherine (2002). "The Social Status of Slaves in the Talmud Yerushalmi and in Graeco-Roman Society". In Schäfer, Peter (ed.). The Talmud Yerushalmi and Graeco-Roman Culture. Vol. 3. ISBN 978-3-16-147852-9.
- Hezser, Catherine. "Slavery and the Jews". In Bradley & Cartledge (2011), pp. 438–455.
- Howley, Joseph A. (21 January 2013). "Why Read the Jurists? Aulus Gellius on Reading Across Disciplines". In du Plessis, Paul J. (ed.). New Frontiers. Edinburgh University Press. pp. 8–30. doi:10.3366/edinburgh/9780748668175.003.0002. ISBN 978-0-7486-6817-5.
- Huzar, Eleanor G. (1962). "Roman-Egyptian Relations in Delos". The Classical Journal. 57 (4). Johns Hopkins University Press: 169–178. ISSN 0009-8353. JSTOR 3293859. OCLC 9974043824.
- Kamen, Deborah (2010). "A Corpus of Inscriptions: Representing Slave Marks in Antiquity". Memoirs of the American Academy in Rome. 55 (95): 95–110. ISSN 0065-6801. JSTOR 41419689. OCLC 9970145185.
- Laes, Christian (31 December 2008). "Child Slaves at Work in Roman Antiquity". Ancient Society. 38: 235–283. doi:10.2143/AS.38.0.2033278. ISSN 0066-1619.
- Laes, Christian (2014). "Infants Between Biological and Social Birth in Antiquity: A Phenomenon of the longue durée". Historia: Zeitschrift für Alte Geschichte. 63 (3): 364–383.
- Madden, John (1996). "Slavery in the Roman Empire Numbers and Origins". Classics Ireland. 3: 109–128. doi:10.2307/25528294. ISSN 0791-9417. JSTOR 25528294.
- Martin, Dale B. (2020). "Slavery and the Ancient Jewish Family". In Cohen, Shaye J. D. (ed.). The Jewish Family in Antiquity. Brown Judaic Studies. pp. 113–130. doi:10.2307/j.ctvzgb9cp.9. ISBN 978-1-946527-69-1. JSTOR j.ctvzgb9cp.9.
- McGinn, Thomas A. J. (2003). Prostitution, Sexuality, and the Law in Ancient Rome. Oxford University Press. ISBN 978-0-19-516132-8.
- Millar, Fergus (1984). "Condemnation to Hard Labour in the Roman Empire, from the Julio-Claudians to Constantine". Papers of the British School at Rome. 52: 124–147. doi:10.1017/S006824620000876X. ISSN 0068-2462. JSTOR 40310809. OCLC 9972877460.
- Mirković, Miroslava (1997). The Later Roman Colonate and Freedom. American Philosophical Society. ISBN 978-0-87169-872-8.
- Mouritsen, Henrik (27 January 2011). The Freedman in the Roman World. Cambridge University Press. ISBN 978-1-139-49503-5.
- Noy, David (2002). Foreigners at Rome: citizens and strangers (Reprinted ed.). London: Duckworth [u.a.] ISBN 978-0-7156-2952-9.
- Parker, Holt (1989). "Crucially Funny or Tranio on the Couch: The Servus Callidus and Jokes about Torture". Transactions of the American Philological Association. 119: 233–246. doi:10.2307/284273. ISSN 0360-5949. JSTOR 284273. OCLC 5548685767.
- Pleket, H. W. (1983). "Urban Elites and Business in the Greek Part of the Roman Empire". In Garnsey, Peter; Hopkins, Keith; Whittaker, C. R. (eds.). Trade in the Ancient Economy. University of California Press. ISBN 978-0-520-04803-4.
- Pritchard, R. T. (1969). "Land Tenure in Sicily in the First Century B.C.". Historia: Zeitschrift für Alte Geschichte. 18 (5): 545–556. ISSN 0018-2311. JSTOR 4435103.
- Rawson, Beryl (5 September 2003). Children and Childhood in Roman Italy. Oxford University Press. ISBN 978-0-19-151423-4.
- Roselaar, Saskia T. (2012). "The Concept of Commercium in the Roman Republic". Phoenix. 66 (3/4): 381–413. doi:10.7834/phoenix.66.3-4.0381. ISSN 0031-8299. JSTOR 10.7834/phoenix.66.3-4.0381.
- Roth, Ulrike (2007). Thinking Tools: Agricultural Slavery Between Evidence and Models. Institute of Classical Studies, School of Advanced Study, University of London. ISBN 978-1-905670-05-5.
- Roth, Ulrike (2010). ""Peculium", Freedom, Citizenship: Golden Triangle or Vicious Circle? An Act in Two Parts". Bulletin of the Institute of Classical Studies. Supplement (109): 91–120. ISSN 2398-3264. JSTOR 44215126.
- Rüpke, Jörg (1992). "You Shall Not Kill: Hierarchies of Norms in Ancient Rome". Numen. 39 (1).
- Rüpke, Jörg (2007). Religion of the Romans. Polity Press. Originally published in German in 2001.
- Saller, Richard P. (1984). "Familia, Domus, and the Roman Conception of the Family". Phoenix. 38 (4).
- Saller, Richard P. (1994). Patriarchy, Property and Death in the Roman Family. Cambridge University Press. ISBN 978-0521326032.
- Saller, Richard P. (1998). "Symbols of Gender and Status Hierarchies in the Roman Household". Women and Slaves in Greco-Roman Culture. Routledge. Also at Taylor & Francis (2005).
- Saller, Richard P. (April 1999). "Pater Familias, Mater Familias, and the Gendered Semantics of the Roman Household". Classical Philology. 94 (2): 182–197. doi:10.1086/449430. ISSN 0009-837X.
- Scheidel, Walter (1997). "Quantifying the Sources of Slaves in the Early Roman Empire". Journal of Roman Studies. 87. Society for the Promotion of Roman Studies: 156–169. doi:10.2307/301373. ISSN 0075-4358. JSTOR 301373. OCLC 8271582373.
- Scheidel, Walter (2005). "Real Slave Prices and the Relative Cost of Slave Labor in the Greco-Roman World". Ancient Society. 35. Katholieke Universiteit Leuven: 1–17. ISSN 0066-1619. JSTOR 44079857.
- Scheidel, Walter (2007). "Demography". The Cambridge Economic History of the Greco-Roman World. Cambridge University Press. pp. 38–86. ISBN 978-0-521-78053-7.
- Scheidel, Walter. "14: The Roman Slave Supply". In Bradley & Cartledge (2011), pp. 287–310.
- Schermaier, Martin (6 March 2023). The Position of Roman Slaves: Social Realities and Legal Differences. Walter de Gruyter. ISBN 978-3-11-098719-5.
- Seager, Robin (1994), "The Rise of Pompey", in Lintott, Andrew; Rawson, Elizabeth; Crook, J. A. (eds.), The Last Age of the Roman Republic, 146–43 BC, The Cambridge Ancient History, vol. 9 (2nd ed.), Cambridge: Cambridge University Press, pp. 208–228, doi:10.1017/chol9781139054379.008, ISBN 978-0-521-25603-2
- Silver, Morris (2011). "Contractual Slavery in the Roman Economy". Ancient History Bulletin (25): 73–132. ISSN 0835-3638.
- Steinberg, Aliza; Manor, Debi (2020). Weaving in Stones: Garments and Their Accessories in the Mosaic Art of Eretz Israel in Late Antiquity. Archaeopress archaeology. Oxford: Archaeopress Publishing. ISBN 978-1-78969-321-8. OCLC 1120098888.
- Stewart, Roberta (25 April 2012). Plautus and Roman Slavery. John Wiley & Sons. ISBN 978-1-118-27415-6.
- Temin, Peter (2004). "The Labor Market of the Early Roman Empire". Journal of Interdisciplinary History. 34 (4): 513–538. doi:10.1162/002219504773512525. ISSN 0022-1953. JSTOR 3656762.
- Terence (26 September 2002). Andria. Bloomsbury Academic. ISBN 978-1-85399-640-5.
- Thein, Alexander (2016). "Booty in the Sullan Civil War of 83–82 B.C.". Historia: Zeitschrift für Alte Geschichte. 65 (4): 450–472. doi:10.25162/historia-2016-0023. ISSN 0018-2311. JSTOR 45019242.
- Treggiari, Susan (1969). "The Freedmen of Cicero". Greece & Rome. 16 (2): 195–204. doi:10.1017/S0017383500017034. ISSN 0017-3835. JSTOR 642848.
- Treggiari, Susan (1981a). "Contubernales in CIL 6". Phoenix. 35 (1).
- Treggiari, Susan (1981b). "Concubinae". Papers of the British School at Rome (49).
- Trimble, Jennifer (2016). "The Zoninus Collar and the Archaeology of Roman Slavery". American Journal of Archaeology. 120 (3): 447–472. doi:10.3764/aja.120.3.0447. ISSN 0002-9114. JSTOR 10.3764/aja.120.3.0447.
- Verbrugghe, Gerald P. (1972). "Sicily 210-70 B. C.: Livy, Cicero and Diodorus". Transactions and Proceedings of the American Philological Association. 103: 535–559. doi:10.2307/2935992. ISSN 0065-9711. JSTOR 2935992.
- Verbrugghe, Gerald P. (January 1973). "The Elogium from Polla and the First Slave War". Classical Philology. 68 (1): 25–35. doi:10.1086/365919. ISSN 0009-837X.
- Vuolanto, Ville (2003). "Selling a Freeborn Child: Rhetoric and Social Realities in the Late Roman World". Ancient Society. 33: 169–207. doi:10.2143/AS.33.0.503599. ISSN 0066-1619. OCLC 9978191698.
- Watson, Alan (1983). "Roman Slave Law and Romanist Ideology". Phoenix. 37 (1): 53–65. doi:10.2307/1087314. ISSN 0031-8299. JSTOR 1087314.
- Watson, Alan (1987). Roman Slave Law. Internet Archive. Baltimore: Johns Hopkins University Press. ISBN 978-0-8018-3439-4.
- Westbrook, Raymond (1999). "Vitae Necisque Potestas". Historia: Zeitschrift für Alte Geschichte. 48 (2): 203–223. ISSN 0018-2311. JSTOR 4436540.
- Westermann, William Linn (1955). The Slave Systems of Greek and Roman Antiquity. American Philosophical Society.
- Wickham, Jason Paul (2014). The Enslavement of War Captives by the Romans to 146 BC (PDF) (PhD thesis). Liverpool University.
- Zwalye, Willem (2003), "Valerius Patruinus' Case Contracting in the Name of the Emperor", in De Blois, Lukas; Erdkamp, Paul; Hekster, Olivier; De Kleijn, Gerda (eds.), The Representation and Perception of Roman Imperial Power, Proceedings of the Third Workshop of the International Network Impact of Empire (Roman Empire, c. 200 B.C. - A.D. 476), Rome, March 20–23, 2002, Brill, pp. 157–169, ISBN 978-90-5063-388-8, JSTOR 10.1163/j.ctv2gjwwd8.15
