= Culture of ancient Rome =

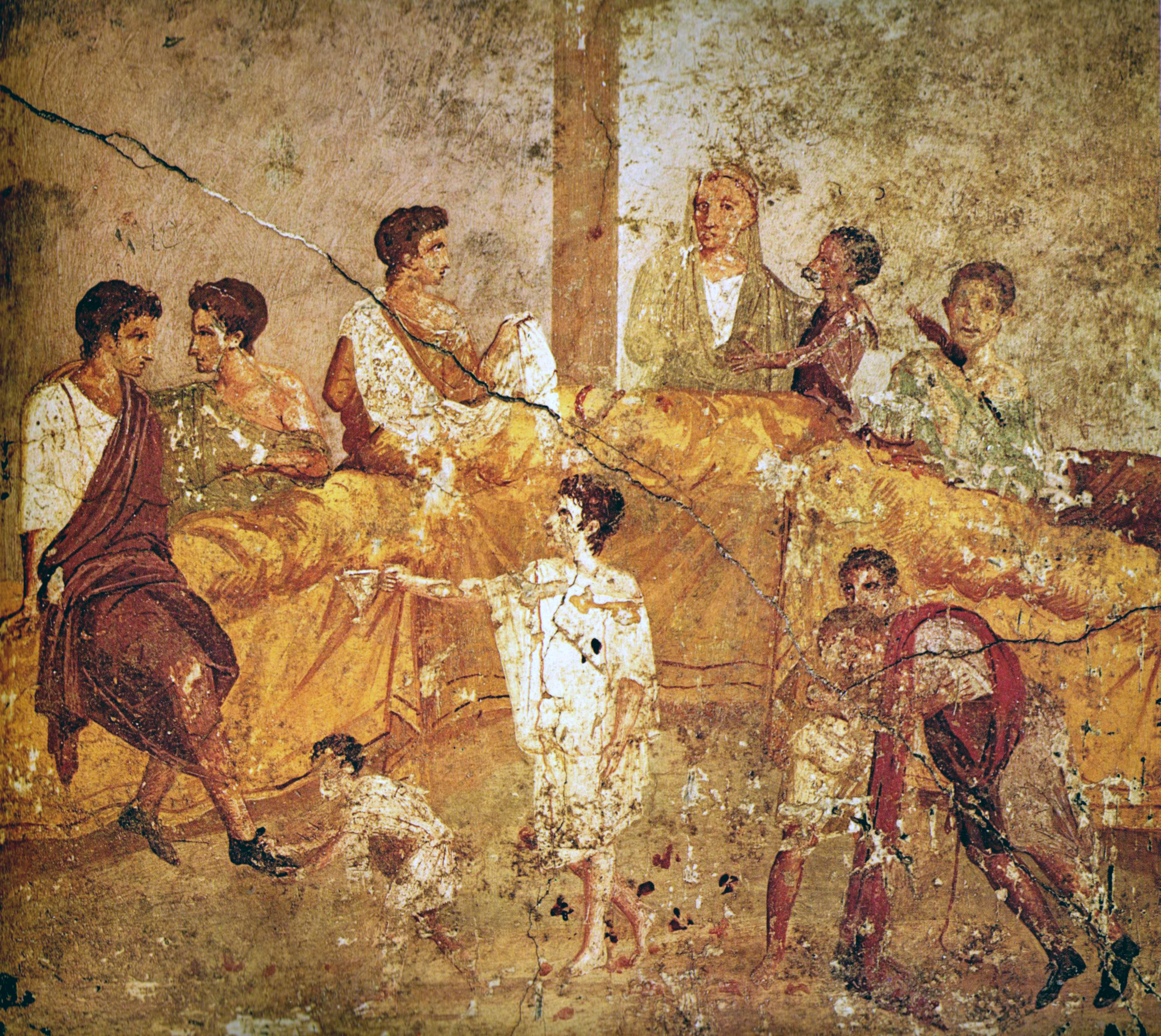
Wall painting (1st century AD) from Pompeii depicting a multigenerational banquet

The culture of ancient Rome existed throughout the almost 1,200-year history of Ancient Rome. The term refers to the culture of the Roman Republic, later the Roman Empire, which at its peak covered an area from present-day Lowland Scotland and Morocco to the Euphrates.

Life in ancient Rome revolved around the city of Rome and its monumental architecture such as the Colosseum, Trajan's Forum, and the Pantheon. The city also had several theaters and gymnasia, along with many taverns, baths and brothels. Throughout the territory under ancient Rome's control, residential architecture ranged from very modest houses to country villas, and in the capital city of Rome, there were imperial residences on the elegant Palatine Hill. The vast majority of Rome's population lived in the city center, packed into Insulae (apartment blocks).

The city of Rome was the largest megalopolis of that time, with a population that may well have exceeded one million people. A substantial proportion of the population under the city's jurisdiction lived in innumerable urban centers, with population of at least 10,000 and several military settlements, a very high rate of urbanization for its time. The most urbanized part of the Empire was Italy, which had an estimated rate of urbanization of 32%. Most Roman towns and cities had a forum, temples and the same type of buildings, on a smaller scale, similar to Rome. The large urban population required a huge supply of food, which was a complex logistical task, including acquiring, transporting, storing and distribution of food for Rome and other urban centers. Italian farms supplied vegetables and fruits, but fish and meat were luxuries. Aqueducts were built to bring water to urban centers and wine and oil were imported from Hispania, Gaul and Africa. There was also a very large amount of commerce between the provinces of the Roman Empire, since its roads and transportation technology were very efficient.

The majority of the population under the jurisdiction of ancient Rome lived in the countryside in settlements with less than 10,000 inhabitants. Landlords generally resided in cities and their estates were left in the care of farm managers. The plight of rural slaves was generally worse than their counterparts working in urban aristocratic households. To stimulate a higher labor productivity most landlords freed a large number of slaves and many received wages, but in some rural areas poverty and overcrowding were extreme. Rural poverty stimulated the migration of population to urban centers until the early 2nd century when the urban population stopped growing and started to decline.

Starting in the middle of the 2nd century BC, private Greek culture was increasingly in ascendancy, in spite of tirades against the "softening" effects of Hellenized culture from the conservative moralists. By the time of Augustus, cultured Greek household slaves taught the Roman young (sometimes even the girls); chefs, decorators, secretaries, doctors, and hairdressers all came from the Greek East. Greek sculptures adorned Hellenistic landscape gardening on the Palatine or in the villas, or were imitated in Roman sculpture yards by Greek slaves.

The Roman Empire began when Augustus became the first emperor of Rome in 27 BC and ended in the west when the last Roman emperor, Romulus Augustulus, was deposed by Odoacer in AD 476. The Roman Empire, at its height (c. AD 117), was the most extensive political and social structure in Western civilization. By 285 AD, the Empire had grown too vast to be ruled from the central government at Rome and so was divided by Emperor Diocletian into a Western and an Eastern Roman Empire. In the east, the Empire continued as the Byzantine Empire led by the Greeks for another thousand years.

Against this human background, both the urban and rural setting, one of history's most influential civilizations took shape, leaving behind a cultural legacy that survives in part today.

== Social structure ==
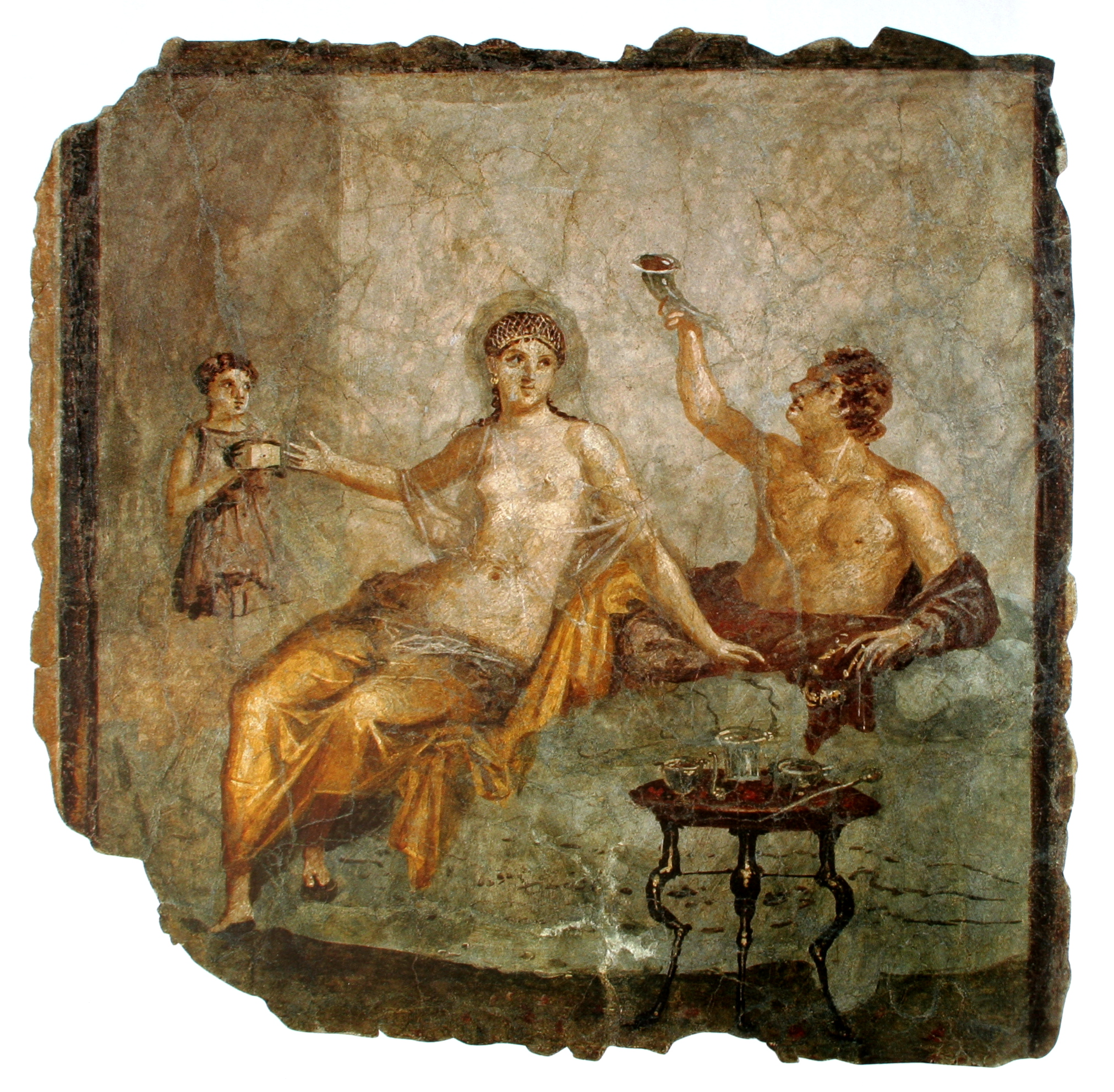
A late Republican banquet scene in a fresco from Herculaneum, Italy, c. 50 BC; the woman wears a transparent silk gown while the man to the left raises a rhyton drinking vessel

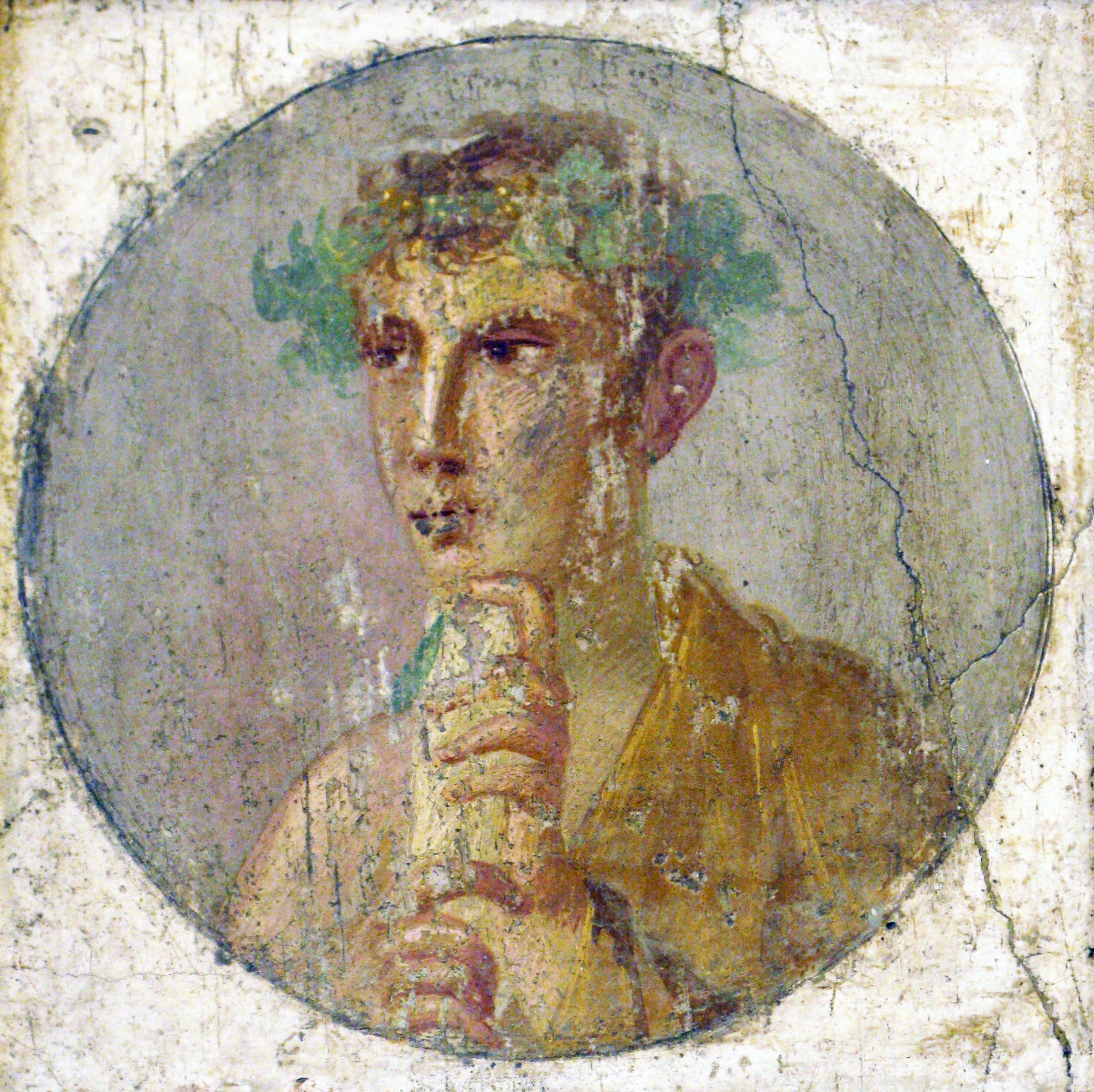
A fresco portrait of a man holding a papyrus roll, Pompeii, Italy, 1st century AD

The center of the early social structure, dating from the time of the agricultural tribal city state, was the family, which was not only marked by biological relations but also by the legally constructed relation of patria potestas ("paternal power"). The pater familias was the absolute head of the family; he was the master over his wife (if she was given to him cum manu, otherwise the father of the wife retained patria potestas), his children, the wives of his sons (again if married cum manu which became rarer towards the end of the Republic), the nephews, the slaves and the freedmen (liberated slaves, the first generation still legally inferior to the freeborn), disposing of them and of their goods at will, even having them put to death.

Slavery and slaves were part of the social order. The slaves were mostly prisoners of war. There were slave markets where they could be bought and sold. Roman law was not consistent about the status of slaves, except that they were considered like any other moveable property. Many slaves were freed by the masters for fine services rendered; some slaves could save money to buy their freedom. Generally, mutilation and murder of slaves was prohibited by legislation, although outrageous cruelty continued. In AD 4, the Lex Aelia Sentia specified minimum age limits for both owners (20) and slaves (30) before formal manumission could occur.

Apart from these families (called gentes) and the slaves (legally objects, mancipia, i.e., "kept in the [master's] hand") there were plebeians that did not exist from a legal perspective. They had no legal capacity and were not able to make contracts, even though they were not slaves. To deal with this problem, the so-called clientela was created. By this institution, a plebeian joined the family of a patrician (in a legal sense) and could close contracts by mediation of his patrician pater familias. Everything the plebeian possessed or acquired legally belonged to the gens. He was not allowed to form his own gens.

The authority of the pater familias was unlimited, be it in civil rights as well as in criminal law. The king's duty was to be head over the military, to deal with foreign politics and also to decide on controversies between the gentes. The patricians were divided into three tribes (Ramnenses, Titientes, Luceres).

During the time of the Roman Republic (founded in 509 BC) Roman citizens were allowed to vote. This included patricians and plebeians. Women, slaves, and children were not allowed to vote.

There were two assemblies: the comitia centuriata and the comitia populi tributa, which were made up of all the citizens of Rome. In the comitia centuriata the Romans were divided according to age, wealth and residence. The citizens in each tribe were divided into five classes based on property and then each group was subdivided into two centuries by age. All in all, there were 373 centuries. Like the assembly of tribes, each century had one vote. The comitia centuriata elected the praetors (judicial magistrates), the censors, and the consuls. The comitia tributa comprised thirty-five tribes from Rome and the country. Each tribe had a single vote. The comitia tributa elected the quaestors (financial magistrates) and the patrician curule aedile.

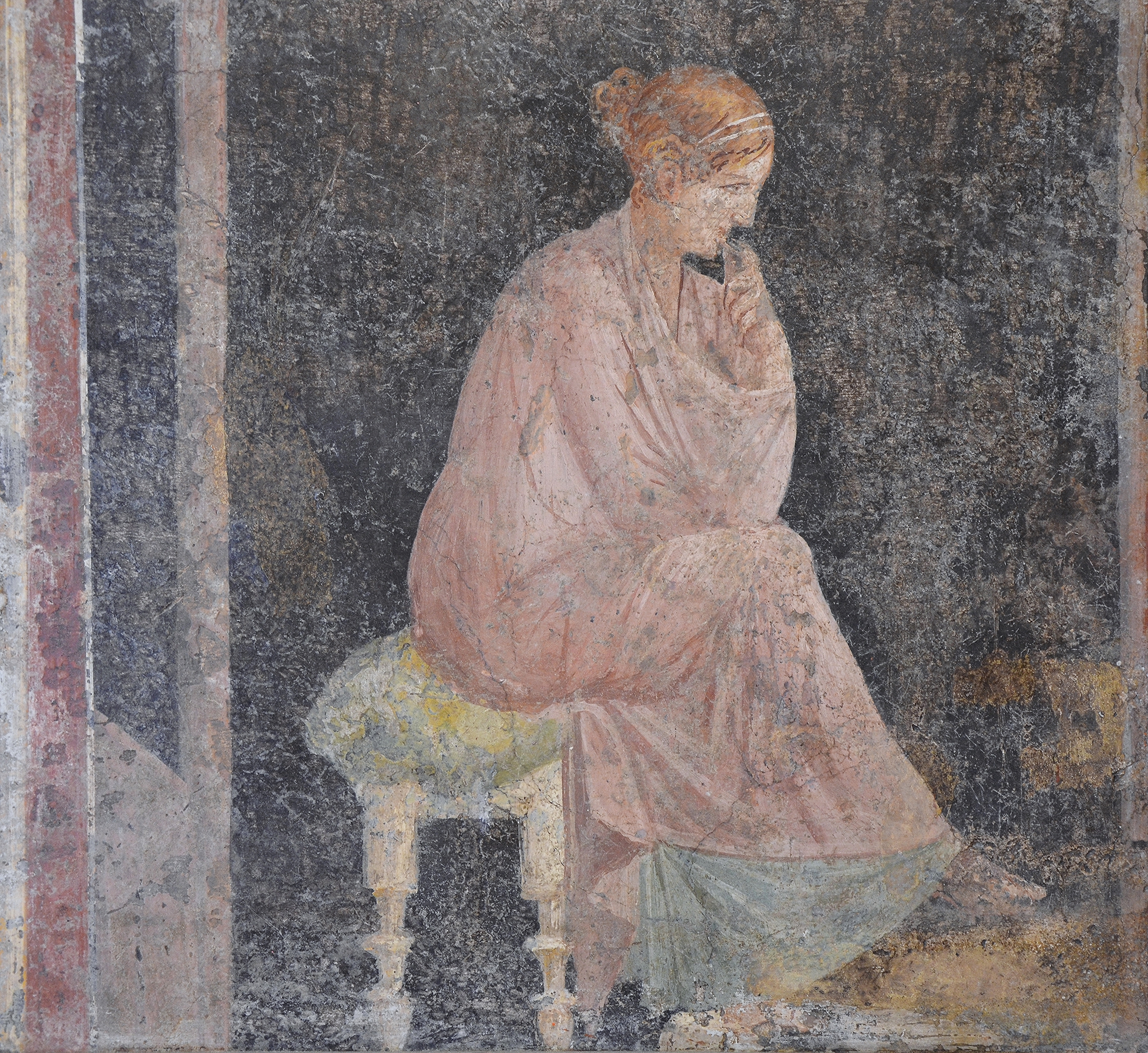
Fresco of a seated woman from Stabiae, 1st century AD

Over time, Roman law evolved considerably, as well as social views, emancipating (to increasing degrees) family members. Justice greatly increased, as well. The Romans became more efficient at considering laws and punishments.

Life in the ancient Roman cities revolved around the Forum, the central business district, where most of the Romans would go for marketing, shopping, trading, banking, and for participating in festivities and ceremonies. The Forum was also a place where orators would express themselves to mould public opinion, and elicit support for any particular issue of interest to them or others. Before sunrise, children would go to schools or tutoring them at home would commence. Elders would dress, take a breakfast by 11 o'clock, have a nap and in the afternoon or evening would generally go to the Forum. Going to a public bath at least once daily was a habit with most Roman citizens. There were separate baths for men and women. The main difference was that the women's baths were smaller than the men's, and did not have a frigidarium (cold room) or a palaestra (exercise area).

Different types of outdoor and indoor entertainment, free of cost, were available in ancient Rome. Depending on the nature of the events, they were scheduled during daytime, afternoons, evenings, or late nights. Huge crowds gathered at the Colosseum to watch events such as events involving gladiators, combats between men, or fights between men and wild animals. The Circus Maximus was used for chariot racing.

Life in the countryside was slow-paced but lively, with numerous local festivals and social events. Farms were run by the farm managers, but estate owners would sometimes take a retreat to the countryside for rest, enjoying the splendor of nature and the sunshine, including activities like fishing, hunting, and riding. On the other hand, slave labor slogged on continuously, for long hours and all seven days, and ensuring comforts and creating wealth for their masters. The average farm owners were better off, spending evenings in economic and social interactions at the village markets. The day ended with a meal, generally left over from the noontime preparations.

=== Clothing ===
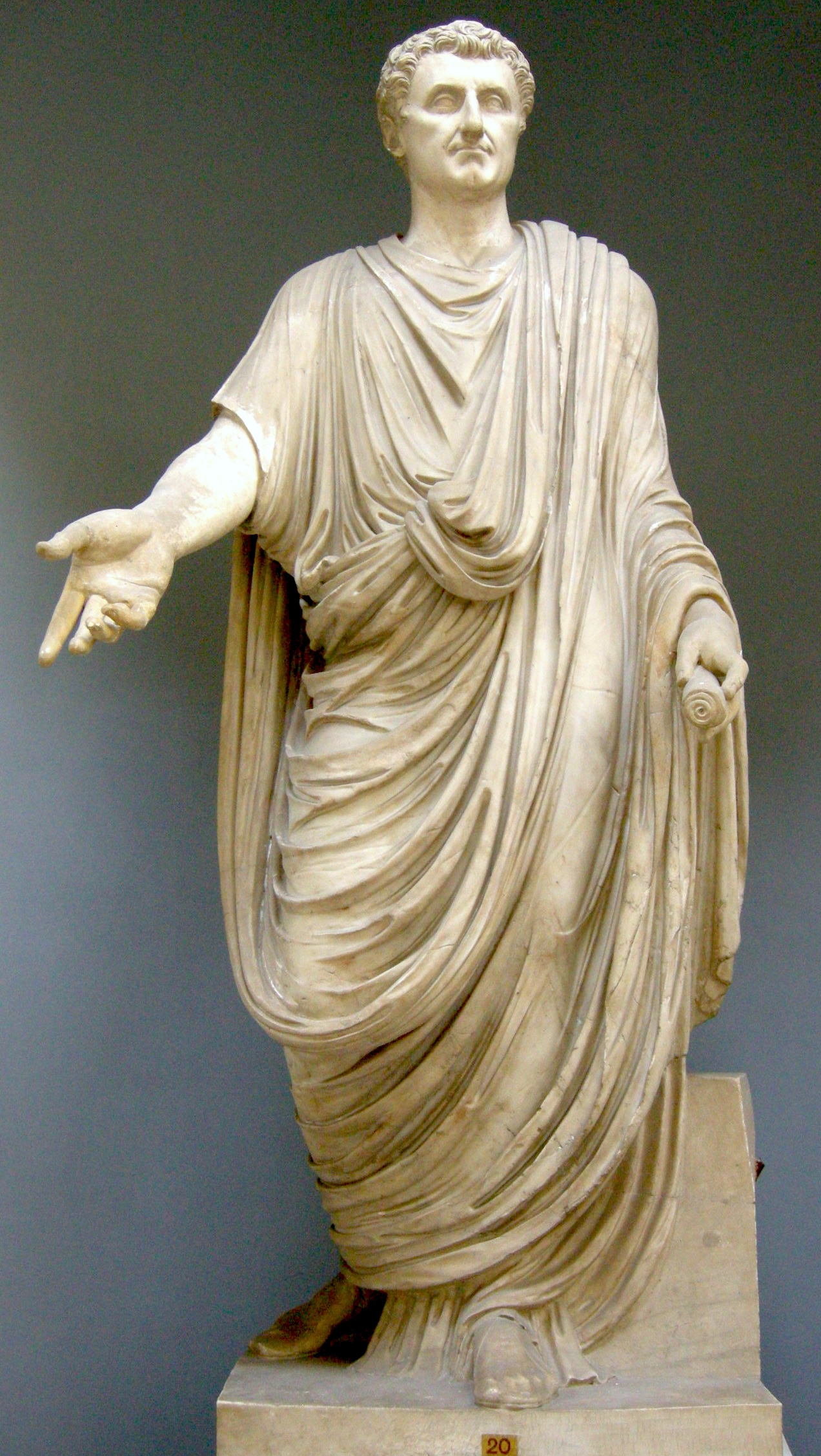
Toga-clad statue, restored with the head of the emperor Nerva

In ancient Rome, the cloth and the dress distinguished one class of people from the other class. The tunic worn by plebeians (common people) like shepherds was made from coarse and dark material, whereas the tunic worn by patricians was of linen or white wool. A magistrate would wear the tunica angusticlavi; senators wore tunics with purple stripes (clavi), called tunica laticlavi. Military tunics were shorter than the ones worn by civilians.

The many types of togas were also named. Boys, up until the festival of Liberalia, wore the toga praetexta, which was a toga with a crimson or purple border, also worn by magistrates in office. The toga virilis, (or toga pura) or man's toga was worn by men who had come of age to signify their citizenship in Rome. The toga picta was worn by triumphant generals and had embroidery of their skill on the battlefield. The toga pulla was worn in mourning.

Even footwear indicated a person's social status. Patricians wore red and orange sandals, senators had brown footwear, consuls had white shoes, and soldiers wore heavy boots. Women wore closed shoes of colors such as white, yellow, or green.

The bulla was a locket-like amulet worn by children. When about to marry, the woman would donate her lunula (also known as partha) to the household gods, along with her toys, to signify maturity and womanhood.

Men typically wore a toga, and women wore a stola. The woman's stola was a dress worn over a tunic, and was usually brightly colored. A fibula (or brooch) would be used as ornamentation or to hold the stola in place. A palla, or shawl, was often worn with the stola.

=== Food ===
Since the beginning of the Republic until 200 BC, ancient Romans had very simple food habits. Simple food was generally consumed at around 11 o'clock, and consisted of bread, salad, olives, cheese, fruits, nuts, and cold meat left over from the dinner the night before. Breakfast was called ientaculum, lunch was prandium, and dinner was called cena. Appetizers were called gustatio, and dessert was called secunda mensa ("second table"). Usually, a nap or rest followed this.

The family ate together, sitting on stools around a table. Later on, a separate dining room with dining couches was designed, called a triclinium. Fingers were used to take foods which were prepared beforehand and brought to the diners. Spoons were used for soups.

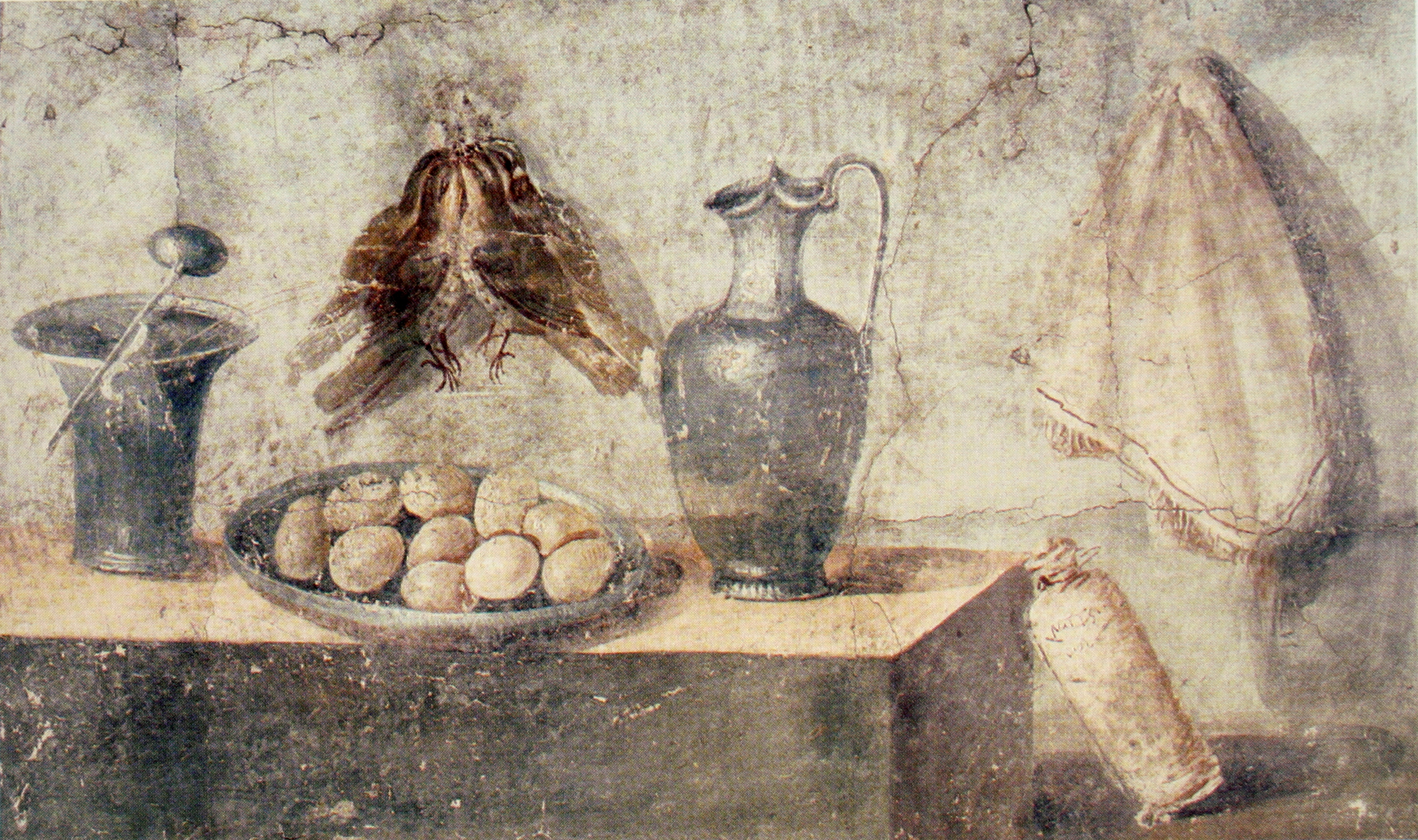
Eggs, thrushes, napkin, and vessels (wall painting from the House of Julia Felix, Pompeii)

Wine in Rome did not become common or mass-produced until around 250 BC. It was more commonly produced around the time of Cato the Elder, who mentions in his book De agri cultura that the vineyard was the most important aspect of a good farm. Wine was considered a staple drink, consumed at all meals and occasions by all classes and was quite cheap; however, it was always mixed with water. This was the case even during explicit evening drinking events (comissatio) where an important part of the festivity was choosing an arbiter bibendi ("judge of drinking") who was, among other things, responsible for deciding the ratio of wine to water in the drinking wine. Wine to water ratios of 1:2, 1:3, or 1:4 were commonly used. Many types of drinks involving grapes and honey were consumed as well. Mulsum was honeyed wine, mustum was grape juice, mulsa was honeyed water. The per-person-consumption of wine per day in the city of Rome has been estimated at 0.8 to 1.1 gallons for males, and about 0.5 gallons for females. Even the notoriously strict Cato the Elder recommended distributing a daily ration of low quality wine of more than 0.5 gallons among the slaves forced to work on farms.

Drinking non-watered wine on an empty stomach was regarded as boorish and a sure sign of alcoholism whose debilitating physical and psychological effects were already recognized in ancient Rome. An accurate accusation of being an alcoholic—in the gossip-crazy society of the city bound to come to light and easily verified—was a favorite and damaging way to discredit political rivals employed by some of Rome's greatest orators like Cicero and Julius Caesar. Prominent Roman alcoholics include Mark Antony, Cicero's own son Marcus (Cicero Minor) and the emperor Tiberius whose soldiers gave him the unflattering nickname Biberius Caldius Mero (lit. "Boozer of Pure Wine," Sueton Tib. 42,1). Cato the Younger was also known as a heavy drinker, frequently found stumbling home disoriented and the worse for wear in the early hours of morning by fellow citizens.

During the Imperial period, staple food of the lower class Romans (plebeians) was vegetable porridge and bread, and occasionally fish, meat, olives and fruits. Sometimes, subsidized or free foods were distributed in cities. The patrician's aristocracy had elaborate dinners, with parties and wines and a variety of comestibles. Sometimes, dancing girls would entertain the diners. Women and children ate separately, but in the later Empire period, with permissiveness creeping in, even decent women would attend such dinner parties.

=== Education ===
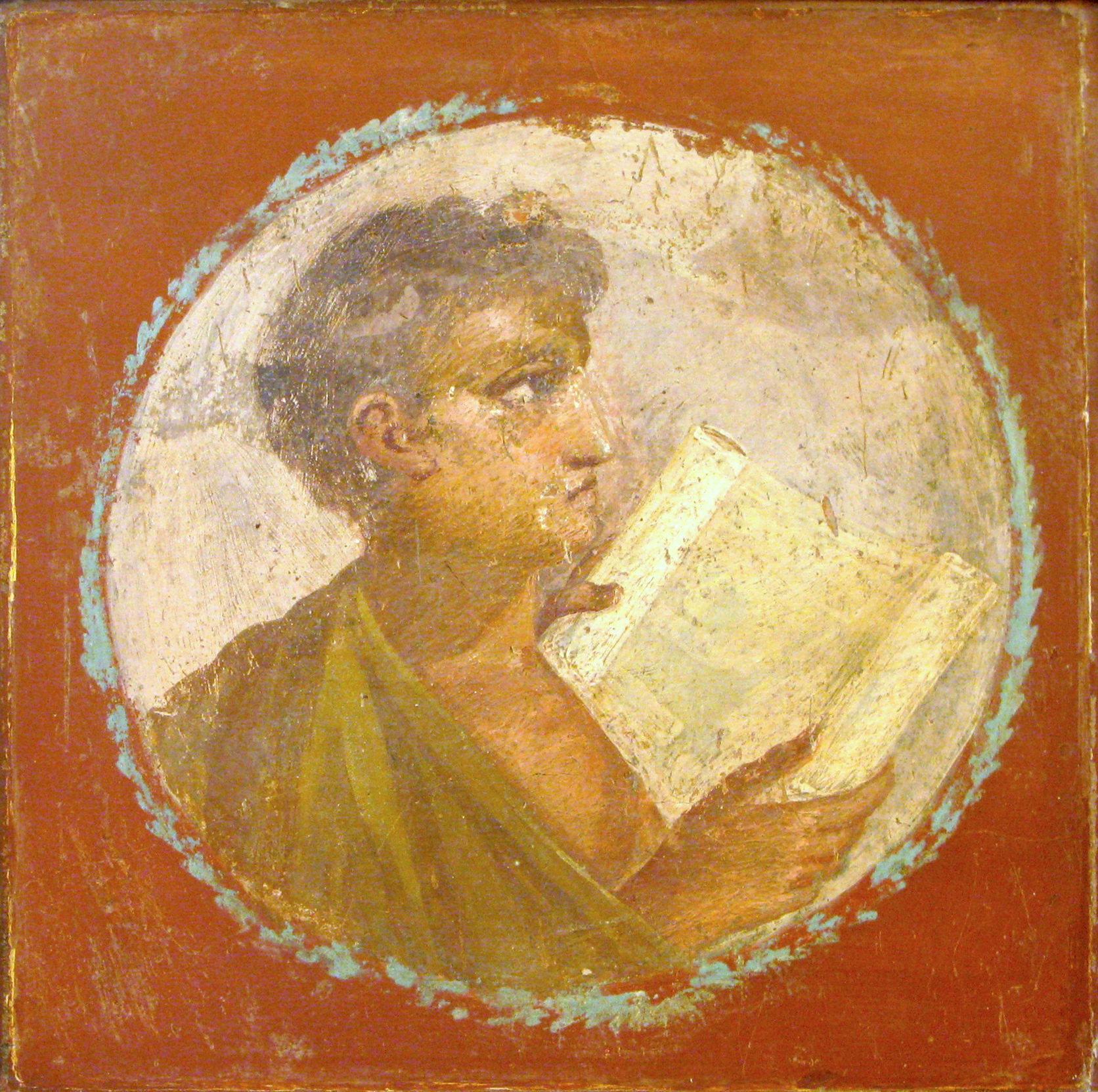
Roman portraiture fresco of a young man with a papyrus scroll, from Herculaneum, 1st century AD

Schooling in a more formal sense was begun around 200 BC. Education began at the age of around six, and in the next six to seven years, boys and girls were expected to learn the basics of reading, writing and counting. By the age of twelve, they would be learning Latin, Greek, grammar and literature, followed by training for public speaking. Oratory was an art to be practiced and learned and good orators commanded respect; becoming an effective orator was one of the objectives of education and learning. Poor children could not afford education. In some cases, services of gifted slaves were utilized for imparting education. School was mostly for boys, but some wealthy girls were tutored at home; however, girls could still go to school sometimes.

== Language ==
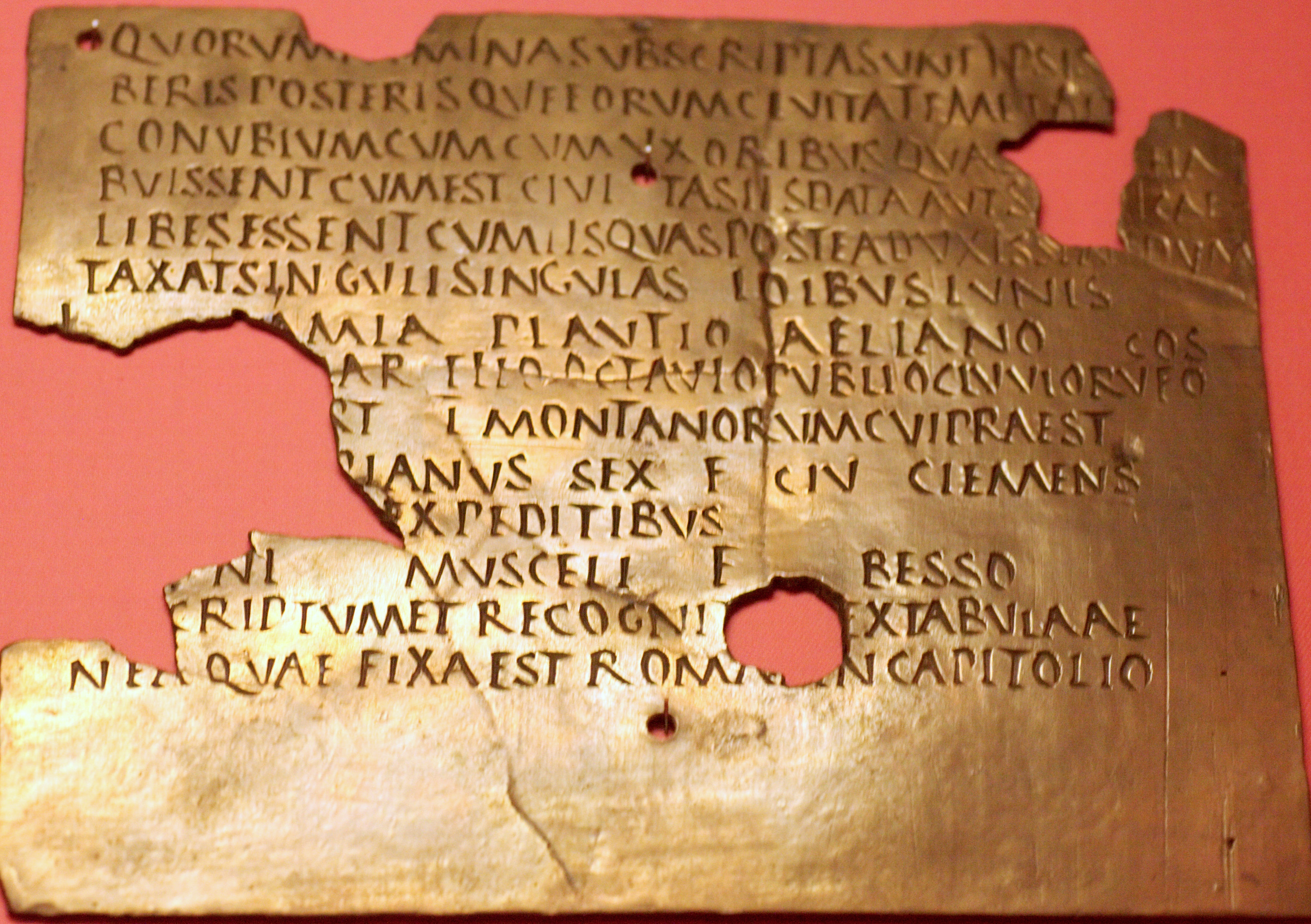
Fragmentary military diploma from Carnuntum; Latin was the language of the military throughout the Empire

The native language of the Romans was Latin, an Italic language of the Indo-European family. Several forms of Latin existed, and the language evolved considerably over time, eventually becoming the Romance languages spoken today.

Initially a highly inflectional and synthetic language, older forms of Latin rely little on word order, conveying meaning through a system of affixes attached to word stems. Like other Indo-European languages, Latin gradually became much more analytic over time and acquired conventionalized word orders as it lost more and more of its case system and associated inflections. Its alphabet, the Latin alphabet, is based on the Old Italic alphabet, which is in turn derived from the Greek alphabet. The Latin alphabet is still used today to write most European and many other languages.

Most of the surviving Latin literature consists almost entirely of Classical Latin. In the eastern half of the Roman Empire, which became the Byzantine Empire, Greek was the main lingua franca as it had been since the time of Alexander the Great, while Latin was mostly used by the Roman administration and military. Eventually Greek would supplant Latin as both the official written and spoken language of the Eastern Roman Empire, while the various dialects of Vulgar Latin used in the Western Roman Empire evolved into the modern Romance languages still used today.

The expansion of the Roman Empire spread Latin throughout Europe, and over time Vulgar Latin evolved and developed various dialects in different locations, gradually shifting into a number of distinct Romance languages beginning in around the 9th century. Many of these languages, including French, Italian, Portuguese, Romanian, and Spanish, flourished, the differences between them growing greater over time.

Although English is Germanic rather than Romanic in origin—Britannia was a Roman province, but the Roman presence in Britain had effectively disappeared by the time of the Anglo-Saxon invasions—English today borrows heavily from Latin and Latin-derived words. Old English borrowings were relatively sparse and drew mainly from ecclesiastical usage after the Christianization of England. When William the Conqueror invaded England from Normandy in 1066, he brought with him a considerable number of retainers who spoke Anglo-Norman French, a Romance language derived from Latin. Anglo-Norman French remained the language of the English upper classes for centuries, and the number of Latinate words in English increased immensely through borrowing during this Middle English period. More recently, during the Modern English period, the revival of interest in classical culture during the Renaissance led to a great deal of conscious adaptation of words from Classical Latin authors into English.

Although Latin is an extinct language with very few contemporary fluent speakers, it remains in use in many ways. In particular, Latin has survived through Ecclesiastical Latin, the traditional language of the Roman Catholic Church and one of the official languages of the Vatican City. Although distinct from both Classical and Vulgar Latin in a number of ways, Ecclesiastical Latin was more stable than typical Medieval Latin. More Classical sensibilities eventually re-emerged in the Renaissance with Humanist Latin. Due to both the prevalence of Christianity and the enduring influence of the Roman civilization, Latin became western Europe's lingua franca, a language used to cross international borders, such as for academic and diplomatic usage. A deep knowledge of classical Latin was a standard part of the educational curriculum in many western countries until well into the 20th century, and is still taught in many schools today. Although it was eventually supplanted in this respect by French in the 19th century and English in the 20th, Latin continues to see heavy use in religious, legal, and scientific terminology, and in academia in general.

== The arts ==
=== Literature ===
Roman literature was from its very inception influenced heavily by Greek authors. Some of the earliest works currently discovered are of historical epics telling the early military history of Rome. As the Roman Republic expanded, authors began to produce poetry, comedy, history, and tragedy.

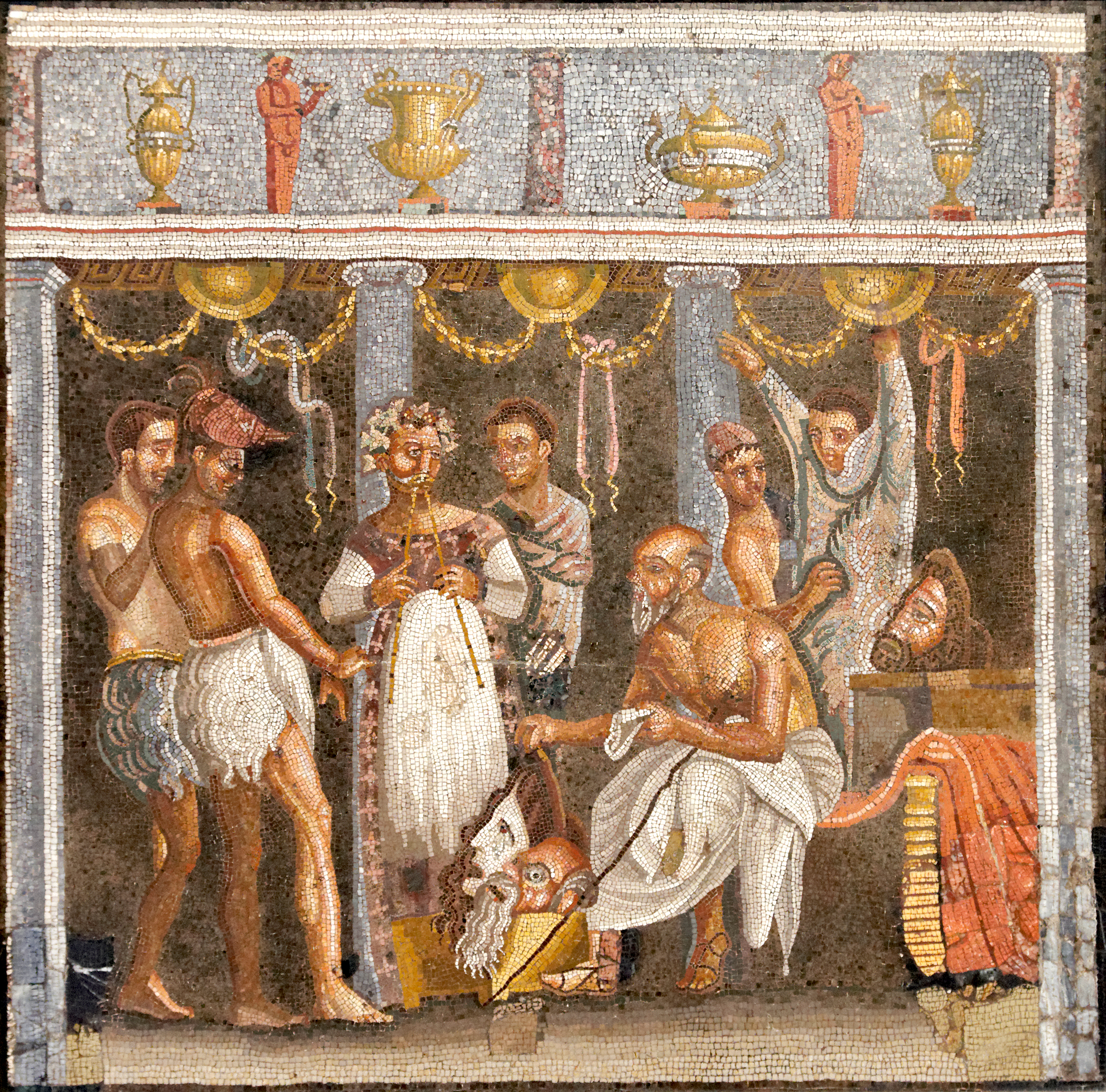
Mosaic depicting a theatrical troupe preparing for a performance

The Greeks and Romans had a tradition of historical scholarship that continues to influence writers to this day. Cato the Elder was a Roman senator, as well as the first man to write history in Latin. Although theoretically opposed to Greek influence, Cato the Elder wrote the first Greek inspired rhetorical textbook in Latin (91), and combined strains of Greek and Roman history into a method combining both. One of Cato the Elder's great historical achievements was the Origines, which chronicles the story of Rome from Aeneas to his own day, but this document is now lost. In the second and early first centuries BC an attempt was made, led by Cato the Elder, to use the records and traditions that were preserved, in order to reconstruct the entire past of Rome. The historians engaged in this task are often referred to as the "Annalists", implying that their writings more or less followed chronological order.

In 123 BC, an official endeavor was made to provide a record of the whole of Roman history. This work filled eighty books and was known as the Annales maximi. The composition recorded the official events of the State, such as elections and commands, civic, provincial and cult business, set out in formal arrangements year by year. During the reign of the early emperors of Rome there was a golden age of historical literature. Works such as the Histories of Tacitus, the Gallic Wars by Julius Caesar and History of Rome by Livy have been passed down through generations. Unfortunately, in the case of Livy, much of the script has been lost and it is left with a few specific areas: the founding of the city, the war with Hannibal, and its aftermath.

In the ancient world, poetry usually played a far more important part of daily life than it does today. In general, educated Greeks and Romans thought of poetry as playing a much more fundamental part of life than in modern times. Initially in Rome poetry was not considered a suitable occupation for important citizens, but the attitude changed in the second and first centuries BC. In Rome poetry considerably preceded prose writing in date. As Aristotle pointed out, poetry was the first sort of literature to arouse people's interest in questions of style. The importance of poetry in the Roman Empire was so strong that Quintilian, the greatest authority on education, wanted secondary schools to focus on the reading and teaching of poetry, leaving prose writings to what would now be referred to as the university stage. Virgil represents the pinnacle of Roman epic poetry. His Aeneid was produced at the request of Maecenas and tells the story of flight of Aeneas from Troy and his settlement of the city that would become Rome. Lucretius, in his On the Nature of Things, attempted to explicate science in an epic poem. Some of his science seems remarkably modern, but other ideas, especially his theory of light, are no longer accepted. Later Ovid produced his Metamorphoses, written in dactylic hexameter verse, the meter of epic, attempting a complete mythology from the creation of the earth to his own time. He unifies his subject matter through the theme of metamorphosis. It was noted in classical times that Ovid's work lacked the gravitas possessed by traditional epic poetry.

Catullus and the associated group of Neoteric poets produced poetry following the Alexandrian model, which experimented with poetic forms challenging tradition. Catullus was also the first Roman poet to produce love poetry, seemingly autobiographical, which depicts an affair with a woman called Lesbia. Under the reign of the Emperor Augustus, Horace continued the tradition of shorter poems, with his Odes and Epodes. Martial, writing under the Emperor Domitian, was a famed author of epigrams, poems which were often abusive and censured public figures.

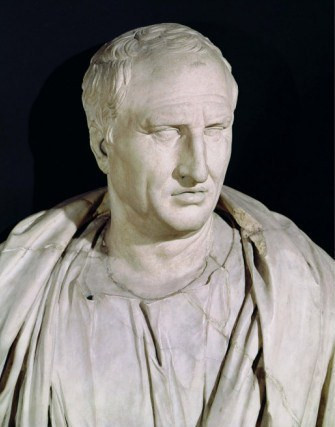
A bust of Cicero, Capitoline Museums, Rome

Roman prose developed its sonority, dignity, and rhythm in persuasive speech. Rhetoric had already been key to many great achievements in Athens, so after studying the Greeks the Romans ranked oratory highly as a subject and a profession. Written speeches were some of the first forms of prose writing in ancient Rome, and other forms of prose writing in the future were influenced by this. Sixteen books of Cicero's letters have survived, all published after Cicero's death by his secretary, Tito. The letters provide a look at the social life in the days of the falling republic, providing pictures of the personalities of this epoch. The letters of Cicero are vast and varied, and provide pictures of the personalities of this epoch. Cicero's personality is most clearly revealed, emerging as a vain vacillating, snobbish man. Cicero's passion for the public life of the capital also emerges from his letters, most clearly when he was in exile and when he took on a provincial governorship in Asia Minor. The letters also contain much about Cicero's family life, and its political and financial complications.

Roman philosophical treatises have had great influence on the world, but the original thinking came from the Greeks. Roman philosophical writings are rooted in four 'schools' from the age of the Hellenistic Greeks. The four 'schools' were that of the Epicureans, Stoics, Peripatetics, and the Academy. Epicureans believed in the guidance of the senses, and identified the supreme goal of life to be happiness, or the absence of pain. Stoicism was founded by Zeno of Citium, who taught that virtue was the supreme good, creating a new sense of ethical urgency. The Peripatetics were followers of Aristotle, guided by his science and philosophy. The Academy was founded by Plato and was based on the Sceptic Pyro's idea that real knowledge could be acquired. The Academy also presented criticisms of the Epicurean and Stoic schools of philosophy.

The genre of satire has been regarded as a Roman innovation, and satires were written by, among others, Juvenal and Persius. Some of the most popular plays of the early Republic were comedies, especially those of Terence, a freed Roman slave captured during the First Punic War.

A great deal of the literary work produced by Roman authors in the early Republic was political or satirical in nature. The rhetorical works of Cicero, a self-distinguished linguist, translator, and philosopher, in particular, were popular. In addition, Cicero's personal letters are considered to be one of the best bodies of correspondence recorded in antiquity.

=== Visual art ===
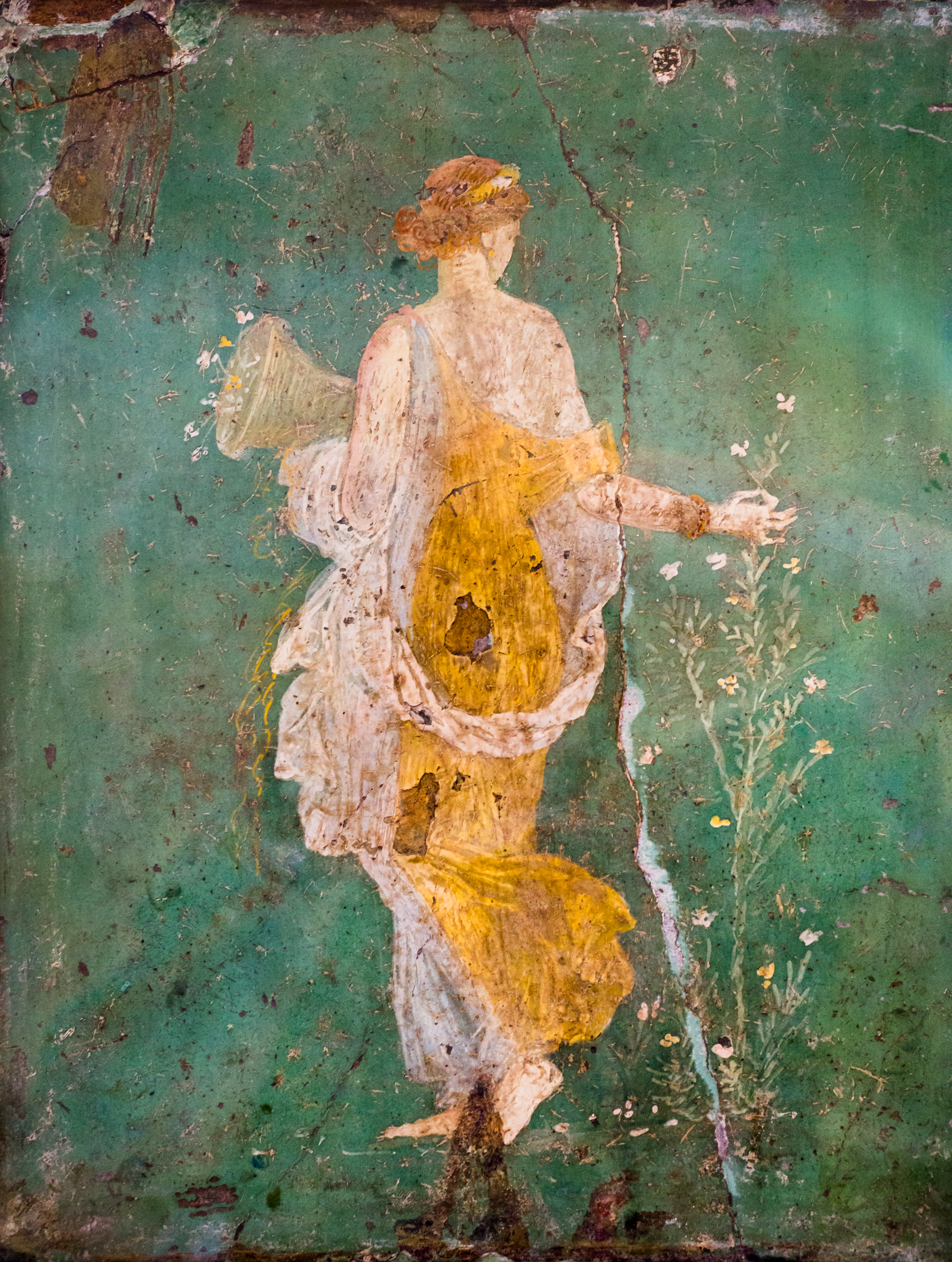
The so-called Primavera of Stabiae, perhaps the goddess Flora

Most early Roman painting styles show Etruscan influences, particularly in the practice of political painting. In the 3rd century BC, Greek art taken as booty from wars became popular, and many Roman homes were decorated with landscapes by Greek artists. Evidence from the remains at Pompeii shows diverse influence from cultures spanning the Roman world.

An early Roman style of note was "Incrustation", in which the interior walls of houses were painted to resemble colored marble. Another style consisted of painting interiors as open landscapes, with highly detailed scenes of plants, animals, and buildings.

Portrait sculpture during the period utilized youthful and classical proportions, evolving later into a mixture of realism and idealism. During the Antonine and Severan periods, more ornate hair and bearding became prevalent, created with deeper cutting and drilling. Advancements were also made in relief sculptures, usually depicting Roman victories.

=== Music ===
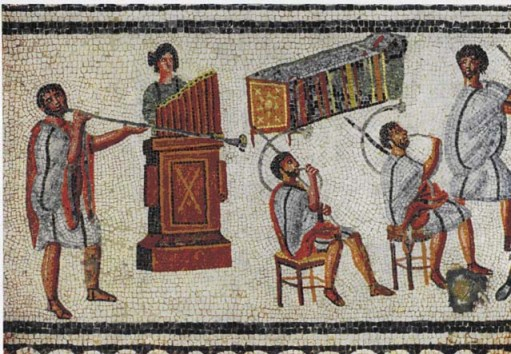
Musicians playing a Roman tuba, a water organ (hydraulis), and a pair of cornua, detail from the Zliten mosaic, 2nd century AD

Music was a major part of everyday life in ancient Rome. Many private and public events were accompanied by music, ranging from nightly dining to military parades and manoeuvres.

Some of the instruments used in Roman music are the tuba, cornu, aulos, askaules, flute, panpipes, lyre, lute, cithara, tympanum, drums, hydraulis and the sistrum.

=== Architecture ===
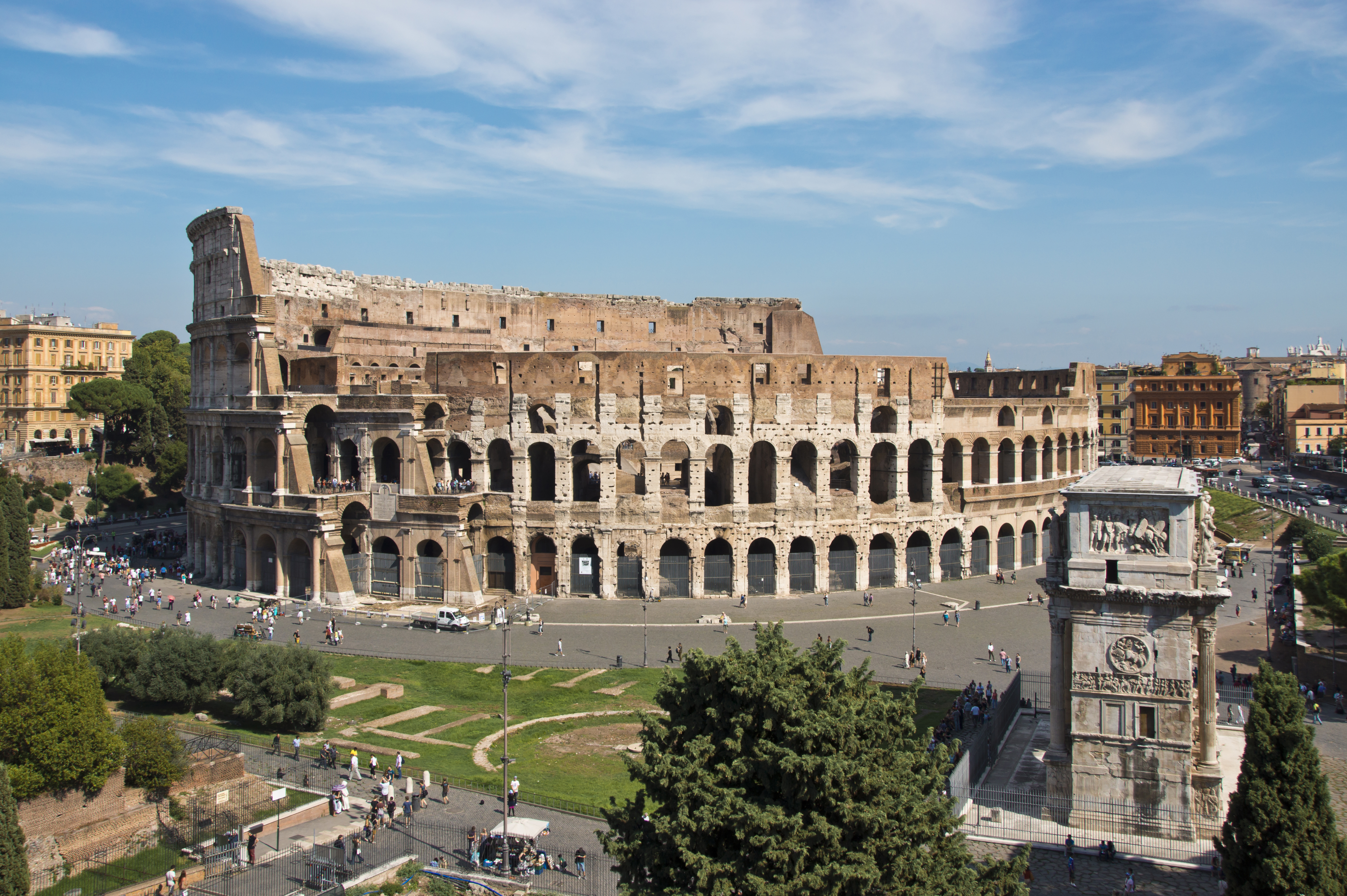
The Colosseum in Rome

In its initial stages, the ancient Roman architecture reflected elements of architectural styles of the Etruscans and the Greeks. Over a period of time, the style was modified in tune with their urban requirements, and civil engineering and building construction technology became developed and refined. The Roman concrete has remained a riddle, and even after more than two thousand years some ancient Roman structures still stand magnificently, like the Pantheon (with one of the largest single span domes in the world) located in the business district of today's Rome.

The architectural style of the capital city of ancient Rome was emulated by other urban centers under Roman control and influence, like the Verona Arena, Verona, Italy; Arch of Hadrian, Athens, Greece; Temple of Hadrian, Ephesus, Turkey; a Theatre at Orange, France; and at several other locations, for example, Lepcis Magna, located in Libya. Roman cities were well planned, efficiently managed and neatly maintained. Palaces, private dwellings and villas, were elaborately designed and town planning was comprehensive with provisions for different activities by the urban resident population, and for countless migratory population of travelers, traders and visitors passing through their cities. Marcus Vitruvius Pollio, a 1st-century BC Roman architect's treatise De architectura, with various sections, dealing with urban planning, building materials, temple construction, public and private buildings, and hydraulics, remained a classic text until the Renaissance.

== Sports and entertainment ==
The ancient city of Rome had a place called the Campus, a sort of drill ground for Roman soldiers, which was located near the Tiber. Later, the Campus became Rome's track and field playground, which even Julius Caesar and Augustus were said to have frequented. Imitating the Campus in Rome, similar grounds were developed in several other urban centers and military settlements.

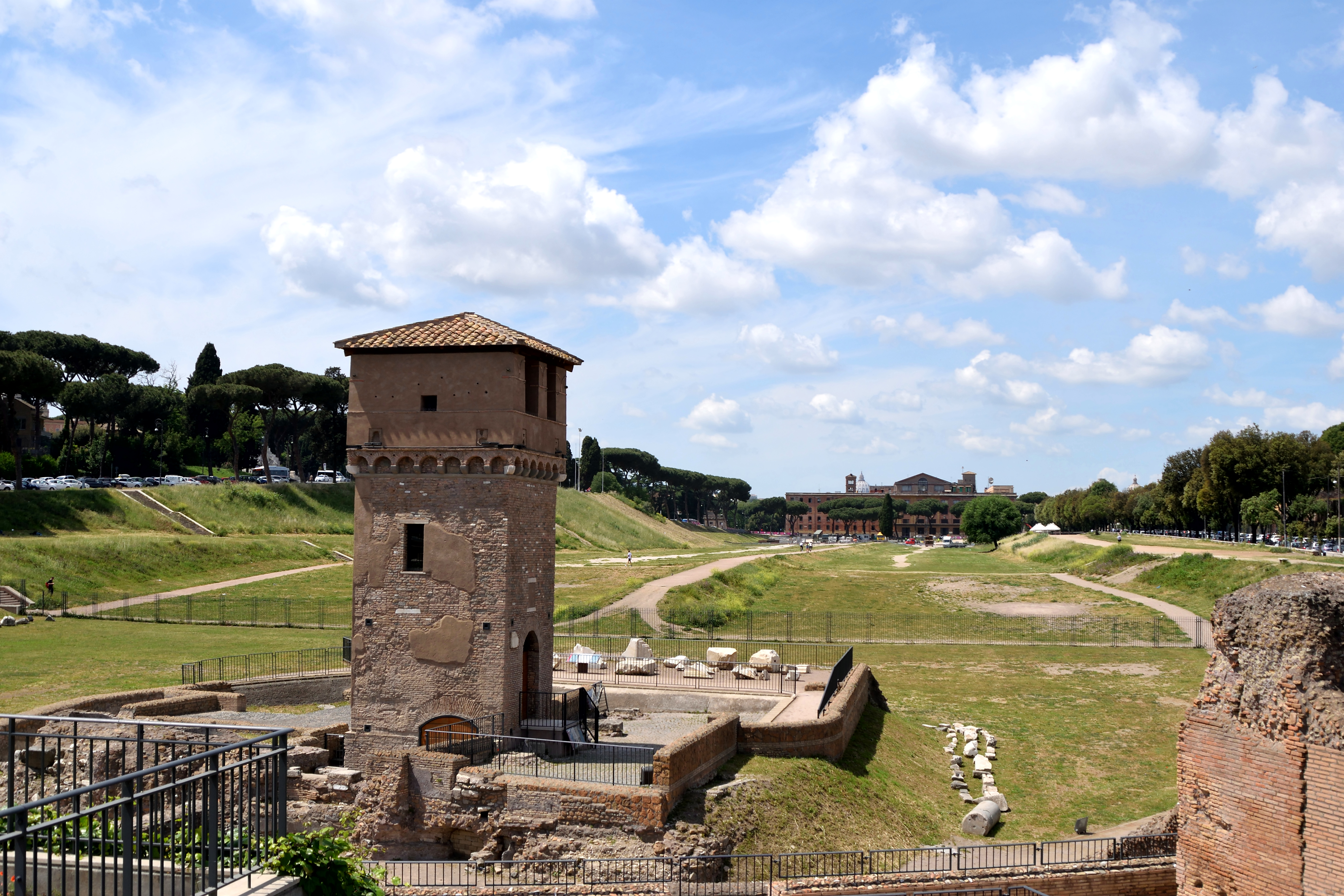
Circus Maximus, a mass entertainment venue located in Rome

In the Campus, the youth assembled to play, exercise, and indulge in appropriate sports, which included jumping, wrestling, boxing and racing. Riding, throwing, and swimming were also preferred physical activities. In the countryside, pastimes also included fishing and hunting. Females did not participate in these activities. Ball playing was a popular sport and ancient Romans had several ball games, which included handball (expulsim ludere), field hockey, catch, and some form of football.

Board games played in ancient Rome included dice (tesserae or tali), Roman chess (latrunculi), Roman checkers (Calculi), tic-tac-toe (terni lapilli), and ludus duodecim scriptorum and tabula, predecessors of backgammon.

There were several other activities to keep people engaged like chariot racing, musical and theatrical performances, public executions and gladiatorial combat. In the Colosseum, Rome's amphitheatre, 60,000 persons could be accommodated. There are also accounts of the Colosseum's floor being flooded to hold mock naval battles for the public to watch.

In addition to these, Romans also spent their share of time in bars and brothels, and graffiti carved into the walls of these buildings was common. Based on the number of messages found on bars, brothels, and bathhouses, it's clear that they were popular places of leisure and people spent a deal of time there. The walls of the rooms in the lupanar, one of the only known remaining brothels in Pompeii, are covered in graffiti in a multitude of languages, showcasing how multicultural ancient Rome was.

== Religion ==
The Romans thought of themselves as highly religious, and attributed their success as a world power to their collective piety (pietas) in maintaining good relations with the Gods. According to legendary history, most of Rome's religious institutions could be traced to its founders, particularly Numa Pompilius, the Sabine second King of Rome, who negotiated directly with the Gods. This archaic religion was the foundation of the mos maiorum, "the way of the ancestors" or simply "tradition," viewed as central to Roman identity.

The priesthoods of public religion were held by members of the elite classes. There was no principle analogous to "separation of church and state" in ancient Rome. During the Roman Republic (509–27 BC), the same men who were elected public officials served as augurs and pontiffs. Priests married, raised families, and led politically active lives. Julius Caesar became pontifex maximus before he was elected consul. The augurs read the will of the gods and supervised the marking of boundaries as a reflection of universal order, thus sanctioning Roman expansionism as a matter of divine destiny. The Roman triumph was at its core a religious procession in which the victorious general displayed his piety and his willingness to serve the public good by dedicating a portion of his spoils to the gods, especially Jupiter, who embodied just rule. As a result of the Punic Wars (264–146 BC), when Rome struggled to establish itself as a dominant power, many new temples were built by magistrates in fulfillment of a vow to a deity for assuring their military success.

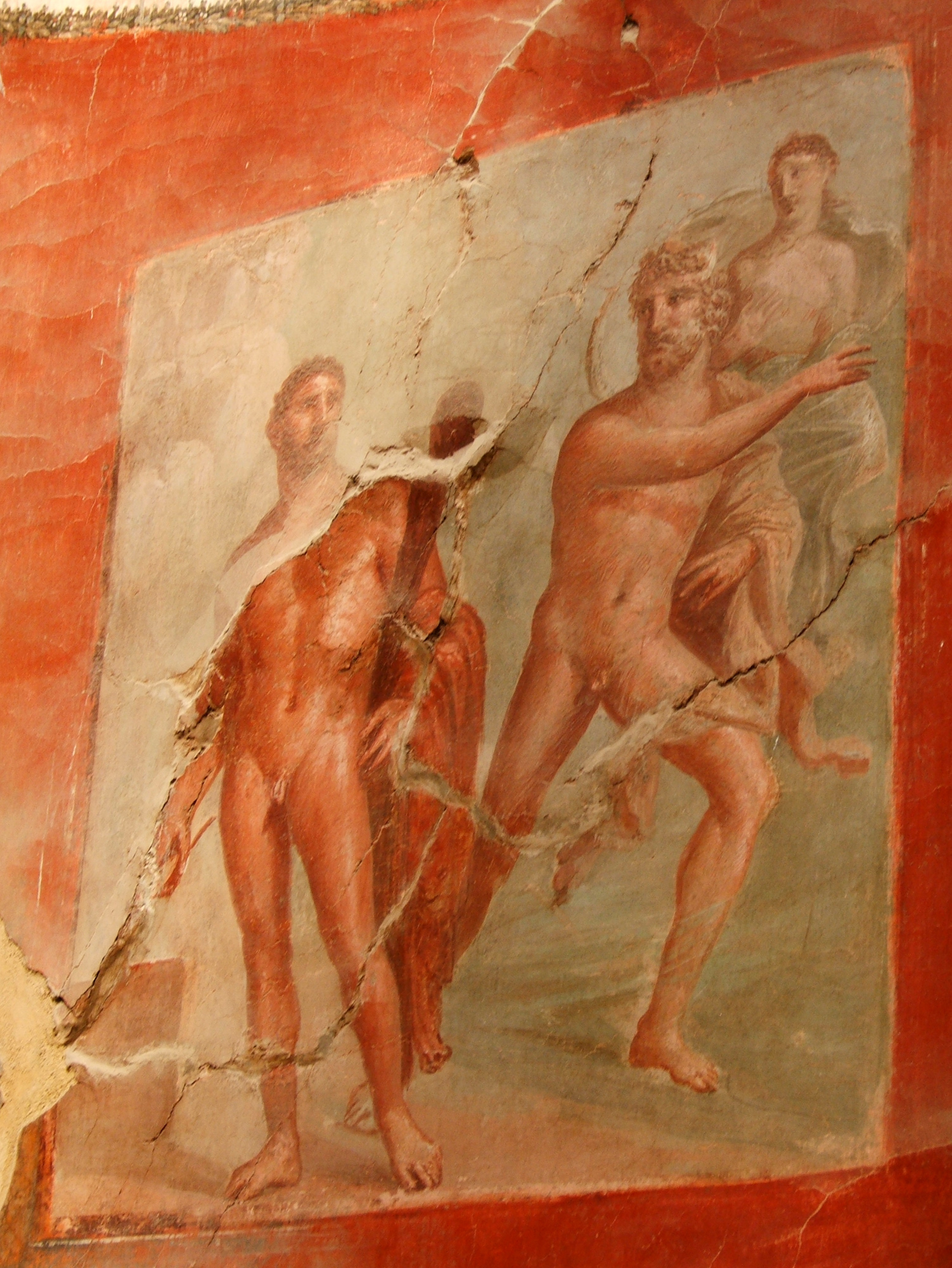
A fresco from Herculaneum depicting Heracles and Achelous from Greco-Roman mythology, 1st century CE

Roman religion was thus mightily pragmatic and contractual, based on the principle of do ut des ("I give that you might give"). Religion depended on knowledge and the correct practice of prayer, ritual, and sacrifice, not on faith or dogma, although Latin literature preserves learned speculation on the nature of the divine and its relation to human affairs. Even the most skeptical among Rome's intellectual elite such as Cicero, who was an augur, saw religion as a source of social order.

For ordinary Romans, religion was a part of daily life. Each home had a household shrine at which prayers and libations to the family's domestic deities were offered. Neighborhood shrines and sacred places such as springs and groves dotted the city. The Roman calendar was structured around religious observances. In the Imperial Era, as many as 135 days of the year were devoted to religious festivals and games (ludi). Women, slaves, and children all participated in a range of religious activities. Some public rituals could be conducted only by women, and women formed what is perhaps Rome's most famous priesthood, the state-supported Vestal Virgins, who tended Rome's sacred hearth for centuries, until disbanded under Christian domination.

The Romans are known for the great number of deities they honored. The presence of Greeks on the Italian peninsula from the beginning of the historical period influenced Roman culture, introducing some religious practices that became as fundamental as the cult of Apollo. The Romans looked for common ground between their major gods and those of the Greeks, adapting Greek myths and iconography for Latin literature and Roman art. Etruscan religion was also a major influence, particularly on the practice of augury, since Rome had once been ruled by Etruscan kings.

Mystery religions imported from the Near East (Ptolemaic Egypt, Persia and Mesopotamia), which offered initiates salvation through a personal God and eternal life after the death, were a matter of personal choice for an individual, practiced in addition to carrying on one's family rites and participating in public religion. The mysteries, however, involved exclusive oaths and secrecy, conditions that conservative Romans viewed with suspicion as characteristic of "magic," conspiracy (coniuratio), and subversive activity. Sporadic and sometimes brutal attempts were made to suppress religionists who seemed to threaten traditional Roman morality and unity, as with the Senate's efforts to restrict the Bacchanals in 186 BC.

As the Romans extended their dominance throughout the Mediterranean world, their policy in general was to absorb the deities and cults of other peoples rather than try to eradicate them, since they believed that preserving tradition promoted social stability.

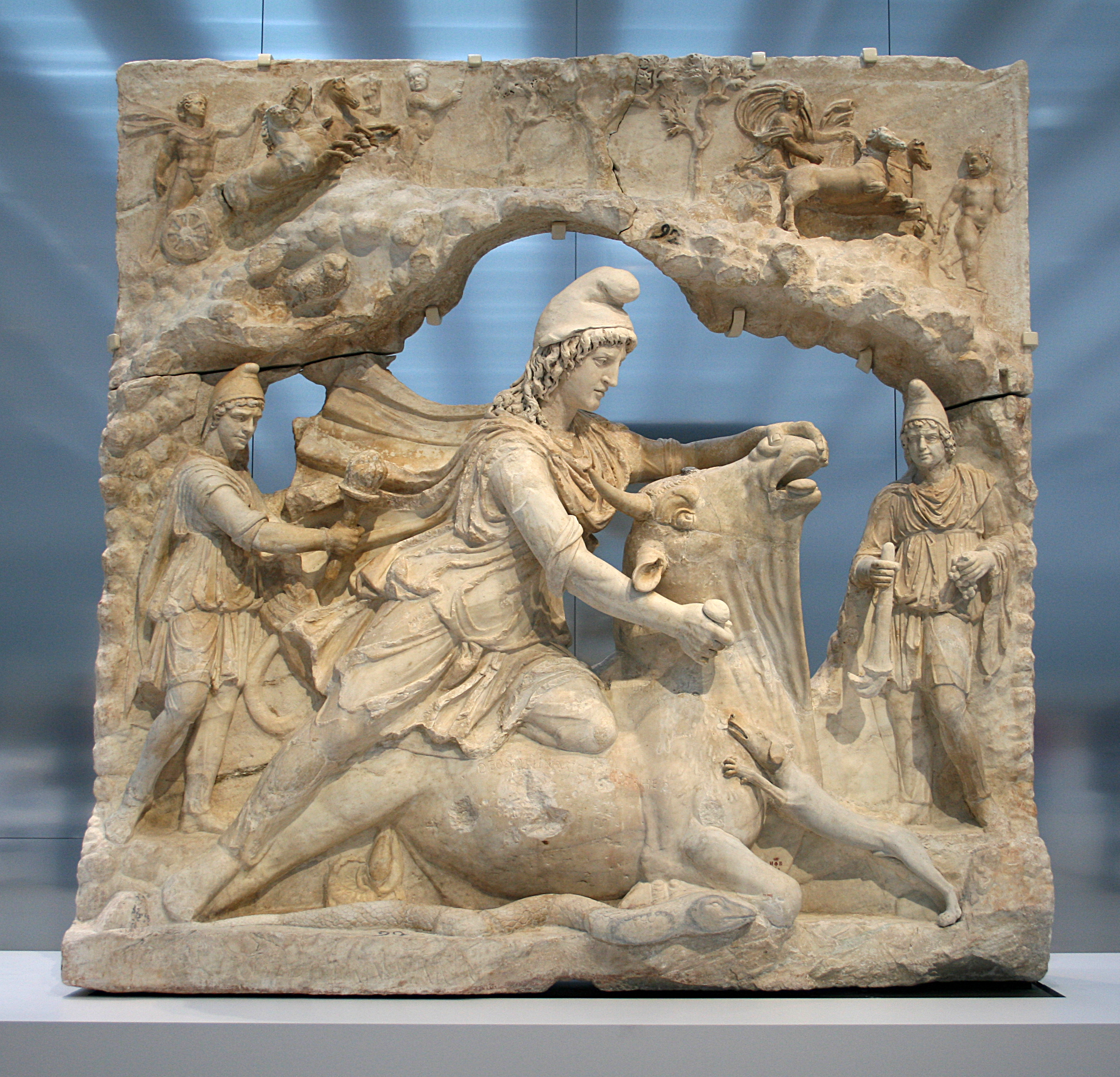
Marble relief of Mithras slaying the bull (2nd century, Louvre-Lens); Mithraism was among the most widespread mystery religions of the Roman Empire.

One way that Rome incorporated diverse peoples was by supporting their religious heritage, building temples to local deities that framed their theology within the hierarchy of Roman religion. Inscriptions throughout the Empire record the side-by-side worship of local and Roman deities, including dedications made by Romans to local gods. By the height of the Empire, numerous international deities were cultivated at Rome and had been carried to even the most remote provinces (among them Cybele, Isis, Osiris, Serapis, Epona), and Gods of solar monism such as Mithras and Sol Invictus, found as far north as Roman Britain. Because Romans had never been obligated to cultivate one deity or one cult only, religious tolerance was not an issue in the sense that it is for competing monotheistic systems. The monotheistic rigor of Judaism posed difficulties for Roman policy that led at times to compromise and the granting of special exemptions, but sometimes to intractable conflict.

In the wake of the Republic's collapse, State religion had adapted to support the new regime of the Emperors. Augustus, the first Roman emperor, justified the novelty of one-man rule with a vast program of religious revivalism and reform. Public vows formerly made for the security of the Republic now were directed at the wellbeing of the Emperor. So-called "Emperor worship" expanded on a grand scale the traditional Roman veneration of the ancestral dead and of the Genius, the divine tutelary of every individual. Imperial cult became one of the major ways Rome advertised its presence in the provinces and cultivated shared cultural identity and loyalty throughout the Empire: rejection of the State religion was tantamount to treason. This was the context for Rome's conflict with Christianity, which Romans variously regarded as a form of atheism and threat to the stability of the Empire, causing the prosecution of anti-Christian policies; under Emperor Trajan's reign (AD 98–117), Roman intellectuals and functionaries (Lucian of Samosata, Tacitus, Suetonius, Pliny the Younger, and Celsus) gained knowledge about the Jewish roots of Early Christians, therefore many of them considered Christianity to be some sort of superstitio Iudaica.

From the 2nd century onward, the Church Fathers began to condemn the diverse religions practiced throughout the Empire collectively as "Pagan." In the early 4th century, Constantine the Great and his half-brother Licinius stipulated an agreement known as the Edict of Milan (313), which granted liberty to all religions to be freely practiced in the Roman Empire; following the Edict's proclamation, the conflict between the two Emperors exacerbated, ending with the execution of both Licinius and the co-Emperor Sextus Martinianus as ordered by Constantine after Licinius' defeat in the Battle of Chrysopolis (324).

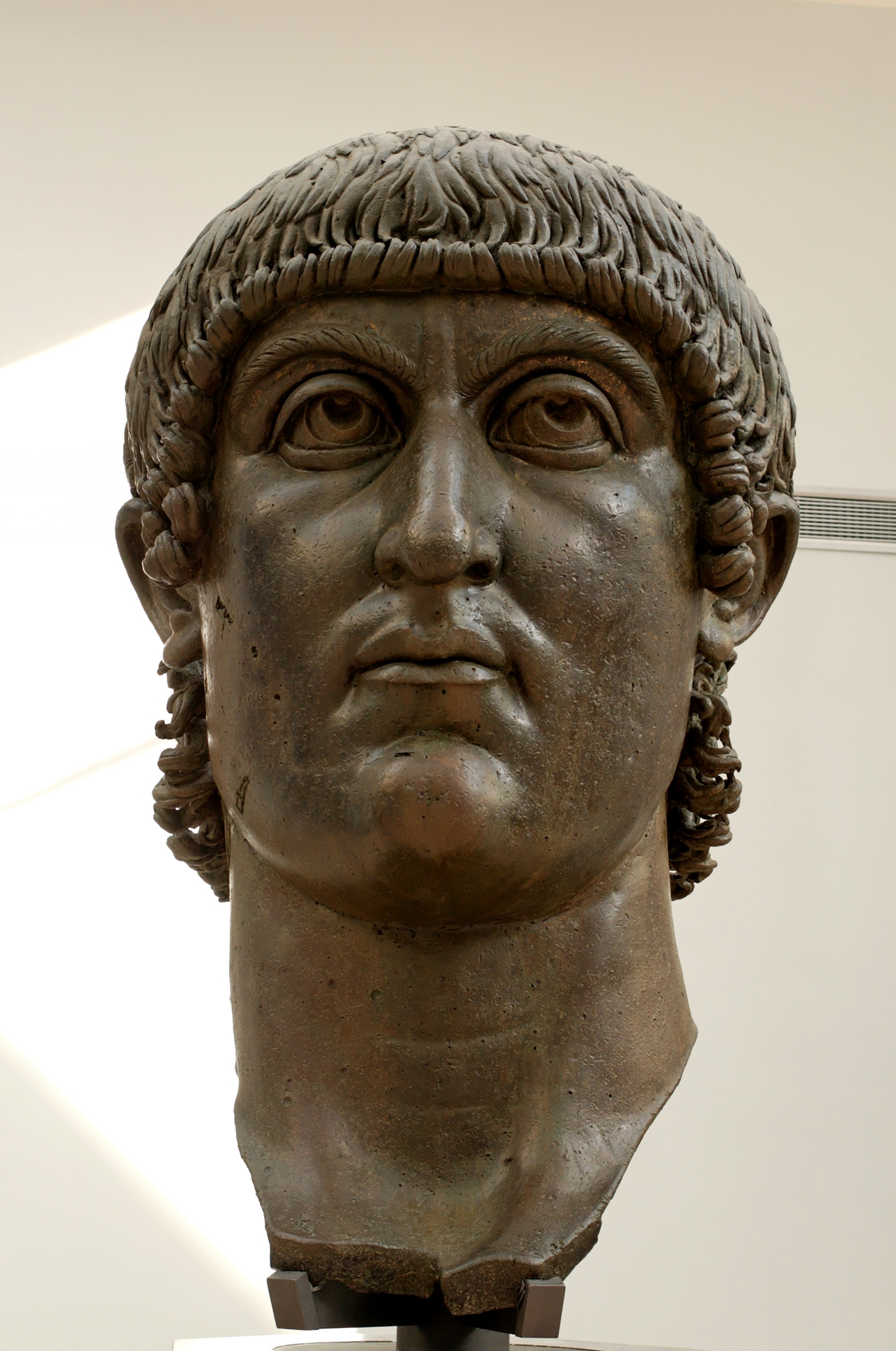
Head of Constantine the Great, part of a colossal statue. Bronze, 4th century, Musei Capitolini, Rome.

Constantine ruled the Roman Empire as sole emperor for the remainder of his reign. Some scholars allege that his main objective was to gain unanimous approval and submission to his authority from all classes, and therefore chose Christianity to conduct his political propaganda, believing that it was the most appropriate religion that could fit with the Imperial cult (see also Sol Invictus). Regardless, under Constantine's rule Christianity expanded throughout the Empire, launching the era of Christian Church's dominance under the Constantinian dynasty.
However, if Constantine himself sincerely converted to Christian religion or remained loyal to Paganism is still a matter of debate between scholars (see also Constantine's Religious policy). His formal conversion to Christianity in 312 is almost universally acknowledged among historians, despite that he was baptized only on his deathbed by the Arian bishop Eusebius of Nicomedia (337); the real reasons behind it remain unknown and are debated too. According to Hans Pohlsander, Professor Emeritus of History at the University at Albany, SUNY, Constantine's conversion was just another instrument of Realpolitik in his hands meant to serve his political interest in keeping the Empire united under his control:

The prevailing spirit of Constantine's government was one of conservatorism. His conversion to and support of Christianity produced fewer innovations than one might have expected; indeed they served an entirely conservative end, the preservation and continuation of the Empire.

— Hans Pohlsander, The Emperor Constantine

The Emperor and Neoplatonic philosopher Julian the Apostate made a short-lived attempt to restore traditional religion and Paganism, and to reaffirm the special status of Judaism, but in 391, under Theodosius I, Nicene Christianity became the official State church of the Roman Empire to the exclusion of all other Christian churches and Hellenistic religions, including Roman religion itself. Pleas for religious tolerance from traditionalists such as the senator Symmachus (d. 402) were rejected, and Christian monotheism became a feature of Imperial domination. Heretics as well as non-Christians were subject to exclusion from public life or persecution, but, despite the decline of Greco-Roman polytheism, Rome's original religious hierarchy and many aspects of its ritual influenced Christian religion as a whole; various pre-Christian beliefs and practices survived as well in Christian festivals and local traditions.

== Philosophy ==
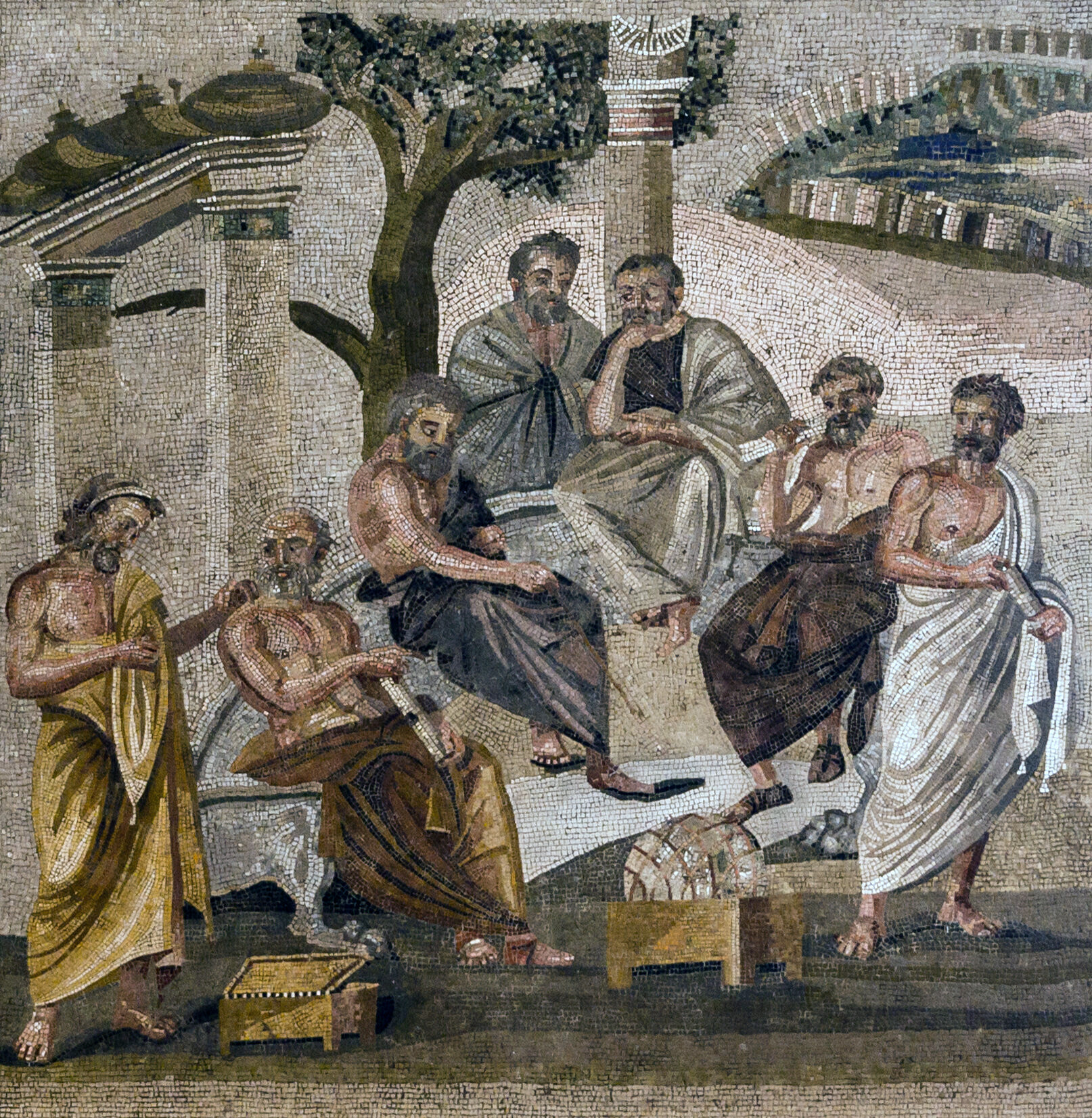
Plato's Academy mosaic from Pompeii

Ancient Roman philosophy was heavily influenced by the ancient Greeks and the schools of Hellenistic philosophy; however, unique developments in philosophical schools of thought occurred during the Roman period as well. Interest in philosophy was first excited at Rome in 155 BC. by an Athenian embassy consisting of the Academic Skeptic Carneades, the Stoic Diogenes, and the Peripatetic Critolaus.

During this time Athens declined as an intellectual center of thought while new sites such as Alexandria and Rome hosted a variety of philosophical discussion.

== Science and technology ==
Roman science was characterized by a focus on practical application over theoretical inquiry. While heavily indebted to Greek precursors, Roman innovators excelled in engineering, medicine, and the systematization of knowledge.

- Engineering and Architecture: The development of Roman concrete (opus caementicium) and the widespread use of the true arch allowed for unprecedented infrastructure. Structures like the Pantheon utilized pozzolanic ash to create the world's largest unreinforced concrete dome. This facilitated a road network spanning over 400,000 kilometers and complex aqueduct systems.
- Medicine: Roman medical knowledge was largely shaped by Galen, whose anatomical studies (primarily via animal vivisection) remained the authoritative standard in Europe for over a millennium. Military medicine was particularly advanced, with the establishment of specialized field hospitals known as valetudinaria.
- Natural Philosophy and Encyclopedias: Pliny the Elder’s Naturalis Historia served as one of the first comprehensive encyclopedias, compiling approximately 20,000 facts on topics from biology to mineralogy. In astronomy, Ptolemy created geocentric models and maps that influenced navigation until the Renaissance.
- Timekeeping: The Julian calendar, introduced by Julius Caesar in 46 BC, corrected the lunar calendar's inaccuracies by introducing a leap year system. It remained the standard for the Western world until the introduction of the Gregorian calendar in 1582.

== The roots of "Roman genius" ==
The Roman cultural revolution began with the construction of the Appian Way, which connected Rome to Greece and the East, and was further fueled by the ideology of the Scipionic Circle, which advocated for the assimilation of Hellenistic civilization. The Latin world was less developed than the Greek-speaking world, with the notable exception of military and political organization.

When it comes to other disciplines, especially technical and scientific ones, the situation becomes more complex. It's undeniable that the Latins made significant contributions in these fields, but throughout the course of ancient Roman history, they had to acknowledge the technical and scientific expertise of the Greco-Oriental world. Indeed, thanks to Alexander the Great, the East was unified under the aegis of Greek culture, giving rise to a highly refined civilization. Experts from the Greek-speaking world (Egypt, Israel, Palestine, Jordan, Lebanon, Syria, Turkey, Cyprus, Greece, Southern Italy ) contributed significantly to the evolution of Roman culture. Following the conquest of the Greek East, many Greek teachers, sculptors, painters, and musicians arrived in Rome and the West. A number of physicians also came, including Galen, of Greek-Anatolian origin, whose work inspired Western medicine until at least the Renaissance.

Civil engineers and architects came from all over the empire, especially from the Greek-speaking regions. This is clear from the correspondence between Pliny the Younger, governor of Bithynia and Pontus, and Trajan. In response to Pliny’s request for an architect from Rome, the emperor replied:

"You cannot be short of architects. There is no country where there are not competent and skilled ones; unless perhaps you think it would be more expedient to send them to you from here, since they are also accustomed to come to us from Greece."

Roman science also remained dominated by the Hellenistic world for centuries, with prominent figures such as Sosigenes, who was consulted by Caesar for the creation of the Julian calendar, as well as Hero and Ptolemy. Even the writing surfaces used by the Romans came from the Greek-speaking world: papyrus was produced in Egypt and parchment in Asia Minor, with its name deriving from the city of Pergamon.

Jurists such as Papinian, Ulpian, and Modestinus were not Latin but Eastern. Roman law itself was reorganized in the Byzantine era by a jurist from Pamphylia, Tribonian. Christianity also originated in the East. The New Testament was written in Greek, and the first Church Fathers were also Greek-speaking.

== See also ==
- Classical antiquity
- Gallo-Roman culture
- Roman Britain
- Romanization
- Romanization of Hispania
- Theatre of ancient Rome
- Romanization of Anatolia

== Bibliography ==
- Elizabeth S. Cohen, Honor and Gender in the Streets of Early Modern Rome, The Journal of Interdisciplinary History, Vol. 22, No. 4 (Spring, 1992), pp. 597-625
- Edward Gibbon, The Decline and Fall of the Roman Empire
- Tom Holland, The Last Years of the Roman Republic ISBN 0-385-50313-X
- Ramsay MacMullen, 2000. Romanization in the Time of Augustus (Yale University Press)
- Paul Veyne, editor, 1992. A History of Private Life: I From Pagan Rome to Byzantium (Belknap Press of Harvard University Press)
- Karl Wilhelm Weeber, 2008. Nachtleben im Alten Rom (Primusverlag)
- Karl Wilhelm Weeber, 2005. Die Weinkultur der Römer
- J.H. D'Arms, 1995. Heavy drinking and drunkenness in the Roman world, in O.Murray In Vino Veritas
