= Manus marriage =

Type of marriage in ancient Rome

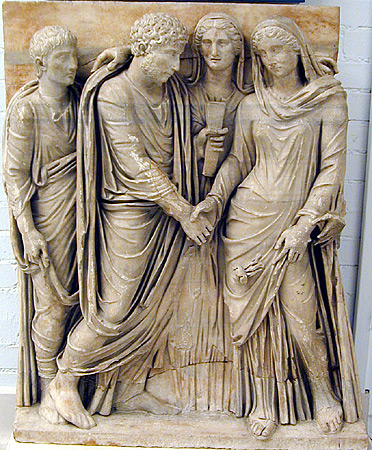
Relief showing a Roman marriage ceremony. Museo di Capodimonte

Manus (/ˈmeɪnəs/ MAY-nəs; Latin: [ˈmanʊs]) was an Ancient Roman type of marriage, of which there were two forms: cum manu and sine manu. In a cum manu marriage, the wife was placed under the legal control of the husband. In a sine manu marriage, the wife remained under the legal control of her father.

In both cum manu and sine manu marriages, if both the husband and wife were alieni iuris (persons under patria potestas; that is, under the power of their respective patres familias), the marriage could only take place with the approval of both patres familias. Procedures for initiating and terminating marriage varied with the type of union.

Initially, cum manu was the sole form of marriage, but eventually only sine manu marriage was widely practiced.

== Cum manu ==
In a cum manu union, the wife was released from the control of her father and became a member of her husband's family, standing thereafter under potestas of her husband or her father-in-law. Legally adopted by her husband, she received the same entitlements as other children in the family over matters of intestate succession and inherited thereafter not from her father but from her husband. However, the power he held over her was limited in comparison to that which he held over his own daughter; he lacked for example, the legal right of life and death, and noxal surrender or sale over her. This change of status, known as capitis diminutio minima, conferred on the wife the title of materfamilias.

The wife in a cum manu marriage held no proprietary capacity, meaning she could not own any property. Ownership of everything acquired prior to cum manu was transferred to her husband or his paterfamilias, while existing liabilities were erased. However, during the time of Cicero, the dowry was recognized as distinguishable and therefore recoverable.

A widowed or divorced woman became sui iuris. A widow of a cum manu marriage could select her own tutor and draft a will.

Cum manu was procured in one of three ways: confarreatio, coemptio and usus.

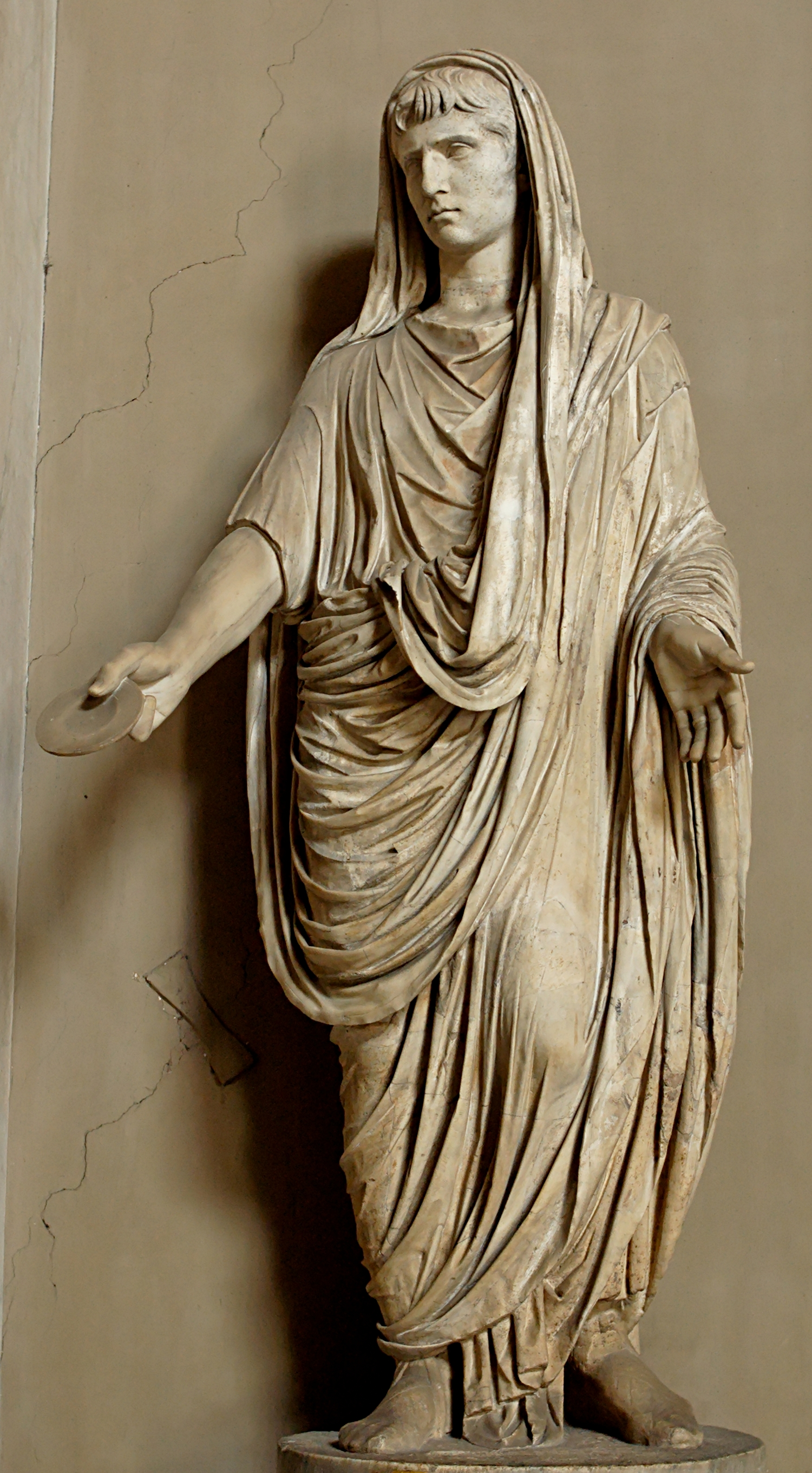
Roman high priests were often associated with the confarreatio ceremony

=== Confarreatio ===
The ritual of confarreatio, a kind of sacrifice made to Jupiter, was available only to patricians. During this ritual, the bride and groom shared a bread made of emmer (farreus) (hence, the term confarreatio translates to "sharing of emmer bread"), a process that required the presence of ten witnesses and the recital of ceremonial sacred verses.

High priests of Jupiter, Mars, and Quirinus were required to be born from confarreatio unions. As confarreatio fell from favor, it became increasingly difficult to find candidates for priesthood. In order to revive the practice of confarreatio, it was amended such that the wife of a Flamen Dialis fell under the control of her husband only during rituals and was otherwise as autonomous as other women. Cum manu was no longer acquired through confarreatio and became restricted to patricians pursuing priestly positions.

=== Coemptio ===
The matrimonial process of coemptio, in essence a notional sale of the woman to the husband, could be transacted at any point during the marriage. The transaction was conducted by a scales-holder in the presence of at least five witnesses, all of whom were adult male Roman citizens. Coemptio could be contracted not only with a husband ("for the sake of marriage"), but also with an outsider ("for the sake of trust"). A wife who had become cum manu through the process of coemptio was emancipated upon divorce. By the 2nd century AD, a wife could compel her husband to emancipate her, a right not shared by her children. Coemptio was presumably a rare practice even during the 2nd century BC.

=== Usus ===
A cum manu acquired by usus was simply the cohabitation of the husband and wife for the duration of a year, after which ownership of the wife was transferred to her partner and she was considered taken by the decree of yearly possession. This process required no ceremonial practices.

If the woman was not willing to come under the ownership of her husband, she could avoid manus by absenting herself for the total of three days and three nights before the end of each year. A woman married cum manu through usus was emancipated upon divorce.

The law of usus was eventually repealed, presumably because the practice had fallen out of use.

== Sine manu ==
In a sine manu union, the wife legally and ritually remained a member of her father's family, standing under the control of her father's potestas. A sine manu marriage did not change the legal status of the bride with respect to property rights. In other words, the bride is not under control of the husband. This form of marriage was not solemnized with ceremonial formalities, although it was customary for the bride to be escorted to her bridegroom's house, but rather involved a husband and wife living together with the intention of marriage under Roman law. The children of this union were legally members of the husband's agnatic kin. They held no legal connection with the mother's paterfamilias and could not make claims on her intestate.

It was only when the woman's paterfamilias died that she became sui iuris. This union allowed the wife to become independent sooner than cum manu, under the assumption that the fathers are likely to have died before a husband. Primarily this served the natal family, allowing her property to stay in the father's possession.

Various factors may have led to the extinction of cum manu and the predominance of sine manu during the Roman Republic. Women faced with the loss of property when entering a cum manu marriage began to only consent to sine manu unions.

== See also ==
- Marriage in ancient Rome
