= Lex Junia Norbana =

Roman law (brought forward in 19 AD)

In Roman Law, the lex Iunia Norbana classified all freedmen into two classes according to their mode of enfranchisement: enfranchised citizens, (freedmen who enjoyed Roman citizenship) and enfranchised Latini (freedmen who had only Latin rights). The date of this lex is uncertain, with arguments for as early as 25 BC or more commonly 17 BC, or as late as AD 19.

Freedmen would be granted only Latin rights if the manumission of the slave failed to meet any of the conditions set out by the Lex Aelia Sentia of 4 AD for it to confer Roman citizenship. This provided that for the freedman to acquire Roman citizenship a slave had to be manumitted at the age of 30 or older, the owner had to have quiritary ownership and the ceremony had to be public. For slaves under the age of thirty, the manumission had to be approved by a special council. The manumission of slaves who had been enslaved because of crimes would raise them only to the position of dediticii (war captives). Thus, the lex Iunia Norbana made the slaves who were not eligible for Roman citizens as per the lex Aelia Sextia enfranchised Latins. The law retained the dediticii. A clause of the law "took away from these Latini Juniani, as they were called, the capacity of making a testament, taking under a testament, and being appointed tutores by a testament."

The Institutes, which were part of the Corpus Juris Civilis (Body of Civil Law) commissioned by Justinian I in the sixth century, recorded that in previous times there were three form of freedmen: those who became Roman citizens, those who acquired inferior freedom as Latins as per the lex Junia Norbana and those who obtained still less freedom as dediticii as per the lex Aelia Sentia. This last status had decayed and the Latini had become rare by then. The Institutes also noted that two edicts corrected this situation. One abolished the dediticii and the other “rendered all freedmen Roman citizens without making any distinction with reference to age, the mode of manumission, or the authority of the manumitting party, as was formerly the practice.”

== See also ==
- Roman law
- List of Roman laws
  - Lex Fufia Caninia
- Status in Roman legal system
