= Lex Fufia Caninia =

Roman law regulating slavery

The lex Fufia Caninia of 2 BC was a law passed under Augustus, the first Roman emperor, concerning the manumission of slaves. The law placed limits on the number of slaves that could be formally released from slavery by means of a will. Testamentary manumission had been established in early Rome as one of three procedures recognized in Roman law as not only granting libertas (liberty) to the formerly enslaved person but also full citizenship.

== Provisions ==
According to the jurist Gaius, the law prescribed the number of slaves who could be freed by a will in proportion to the size of the estate.

- An estate holding only one or two slaves was excluded from the law, and the testator had free discretion in manumission.
- For an estate holding three and up to ten slaves, no more than half could be manumitted;

- over ten and up to thirty, a third;
- over thirty and up to hundred, a fourth;
- over one hundred and up to five hundred, a fifth, with a cap of one hundred regardless of the size of the estate.

Any fugitive slaves belonging to the decedent were counted as part of the total number of slaves in the estate. Each slave to be manumitted had to be listed by name in the will, though a description or job title might be accepted if unique, such as allowing for the child of a named female slave to be freed if not yet born at the time the will was made.

== Purpose and effect ==
Along with the lex Iunia Norbana, most often dated to 17 BC, and the lex Aelia Sentia of AD 4, the lex Fufia Caninia was part of a program of Augustan social legislation that, among other objectives, regulated the status nexus of slave and free. The ancient right of masters to dispose of their slaves at their discretion – a matter of private law during the Republic, and an aspect of Roman patriarchy (patria potestas) – was reframed by these laws as an interest of the state.

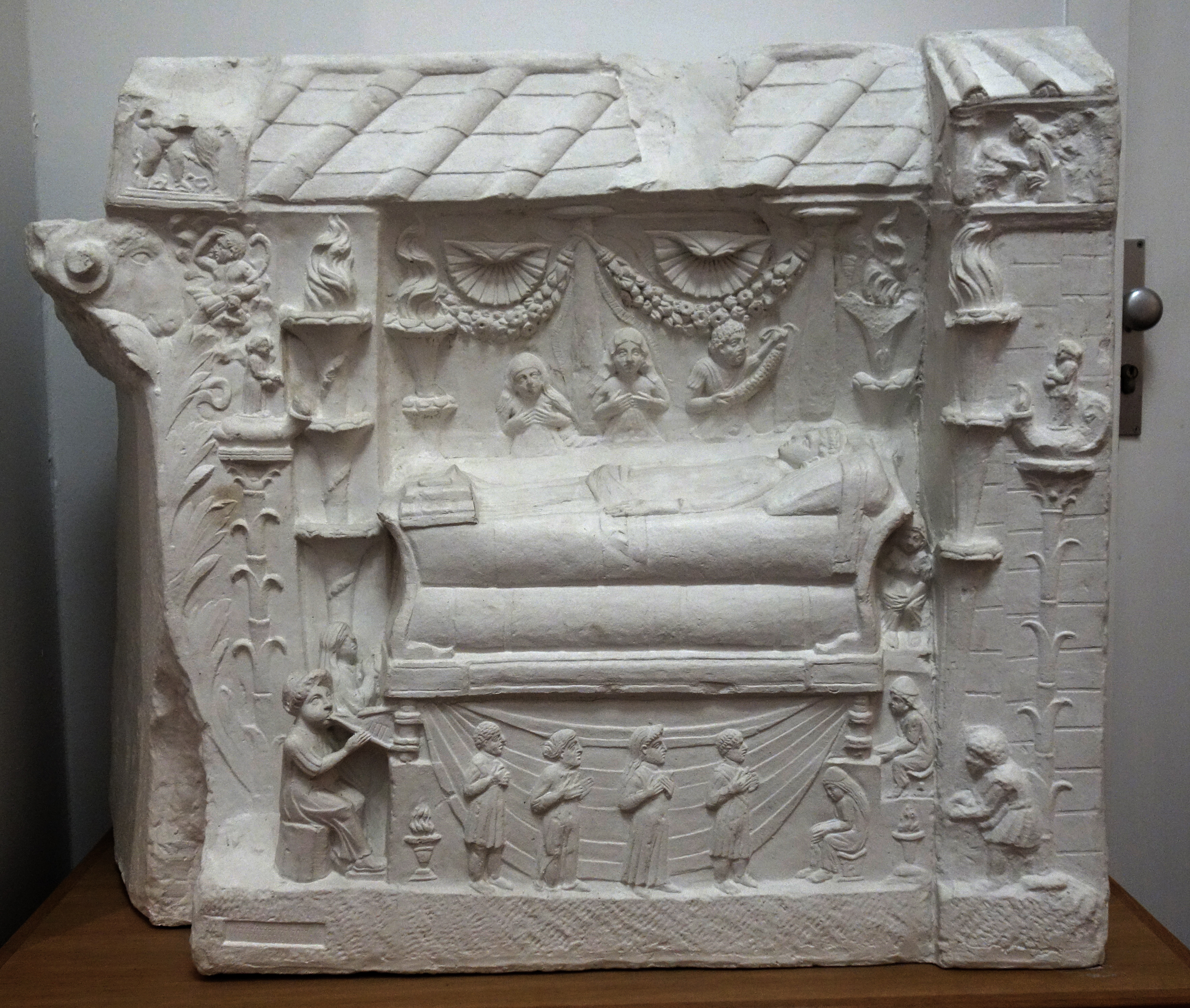
Plaster cast of an early 2nd-century relief from the Tomb of the Haterii depicting mourning; the caps on the figures at lower right suggest they were slaves freed in the deceased's will

Preserving the value of the estate for the heirs against end-of-life exuberance and protecting the claims of creditors are two perceived purposes of the law. A few ancient sources claim that masters had been freeing slaves "indiscriminately" with the stipulation that they participate in funeral rites, bolstering the deceased's social profile through the large number of mourners, but to the material detriment of the living successors. Economic historian Peter Temin saw the law from a labor market perspective as a way to incentivize slaves to prove their value and gain one of the limited opportunities for manumission. Others, such as P. A. Brunt, have viewed the law as more generally encouraging owners to filter candidates for manumission based on their readiness for participating as citizens.

The lex Fufia Caninia may or may not have limited the demographic impact of former slaves on Roman society, and the law is not seen by most scholars in the 21st century as primarily aimed at reducing the total number of manumissions. But since testamentary manumission is thought to have been the most common of the three forms creating a new citizen through manumission, the numerical limits may have led to more informal manumissions, which did not come with full rights of citizenship.

The lex Fufia Caninia was abolished in AD 528 under the emperor Justinian, during reforms that dismantled most of the Augustan legislation on manumission.

== See also ==
- Inheritance law in ancient Rome
- Status in Roman legal system
- List of Roman laws
