= Noxal surrender =

Ancient Roman legal provision for crimes committed by a dependent

Noxal surrender was a provision of Roman law when a delict was brought against a paterfamilias for a wrong committed by a son or slave. The defendant had the option in that instance of surrendering the dependent rather than paying the full damages.
