= Status in Roman legal system =

Status of a person under ancient Roman law

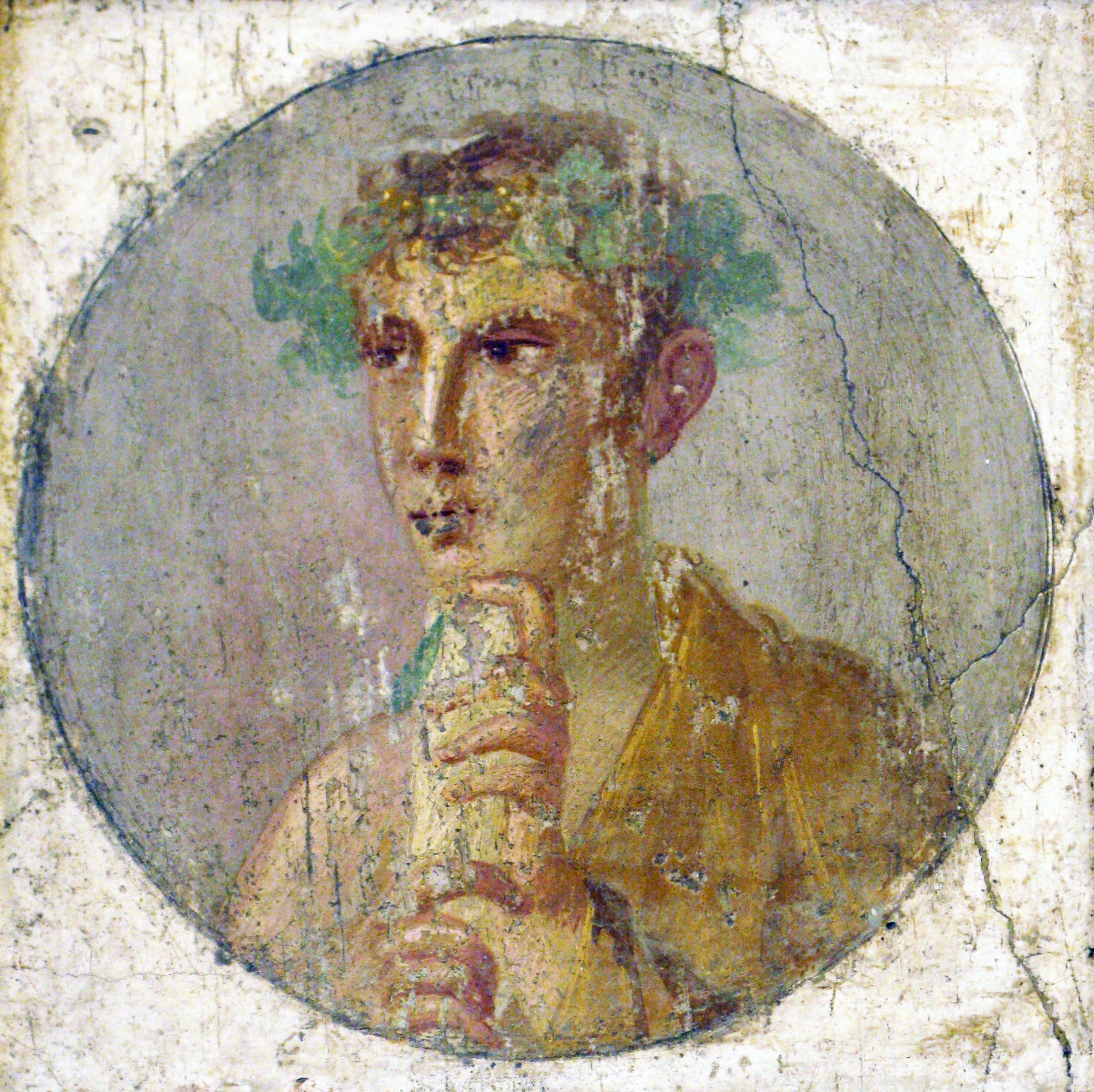
A fresco portrait of a man holding a papyrus roll, Pompeii, Italy, 1st century AD

In Roman law, status describes a person's legal status. The individual could be a Roman citizen (status civitatis), unlike foreigners; or he could be free (status libertatis), unlike slaves; or he could have a certain position in a Roman family (status familiae) either as head of the family (pater familias), or as a lower member (filii familias).

== Status civitatis ==
In the Roman state, according to Roman civil law (ius civile), only Roman citizens had the full civil and political rights. In regard to status civitatis, in the Roman state, there were cives, Latini and peregrini, and foreigners. Outside the Roman state, there were externi, barbari and hostes.

== Status familiae ==
Status familiae is the legal status of an individual in the family. The pater familias had the authority in the family (patria potestas), and everyone was subjected to him based on adgnatio (kinship only from father's side). This had an impact in private law. There is a distinction between alieni iuris (persons under patria potestas) and sui iuris (persons autonomous of patria potestas, who could only be the pater familias himself). Filius familias had ius suffragii and ius honorum, but in the area of private law he was restricted because of patria potestas.

== Status libertatis ==
The social and legal status of slaves in the Roman state was different in different epochs. In the time of old civil law (ius civile Quiritium) slavery had a patriarchal shape (a slave did the same job and lived under the same conditions as his master and family). After Rome's victorious wars, from the 3rd century BC, huge numbers of slaves came to Rome, and that resulted in slave trade and increased exploitation of slaves. From that time on, a slave became only a thing (res)- servi pro nullis habentur.

=== Legal status ===
The legal state of slaves was based on the fact that the slave was not a subject but an object of law. A master had the right of ownership over the slave. He could sell him, give him in pawn but certainly could not harm or kill him. If someone injured his slave, a master could initiate legal proceedings and demand protection. The ownership over the slave was called dominica potestas, and not dominium like the ownership of objects and animals.

In the Roman legal system, a slave did not have a family. His sexual relationships with other slaves was not marriage (matrimonium), but a cohabitation without legal consequences (contubernium).

Masters could also give over a certain amount of property (such as land, buildings), known as peculium, to a slave for his management and use. This peculium was protected under Roman law and inaccessible by the owner. This was another tool slaves could use to purchase their freedom.

=== Means of becoming a slave ===
The oldest means of becoming a slave was to be captured as an enemy in war. However, even a foreigner could become free again and even a Roman citizen could become a slave. Slavery was hereditary, and the child of a slave woman became a slave no matter who the father was. However, according to classical law, a child of a slave became free (ingenuus), if his or her mother was free, even for a short period of time, during the pregnancy.

There were a number of means by which a free man could become a slave in Roman society.

- According to Twelve Tables:

Æris confessi rebusque iure iudicatis XXX dies iusti sunto.

A person who admits to owing money or has been adjudged to owe money must be given 30 days to pay.

Post deinde manus iniectio esto. In ius ducito. Ni iudicatum facit aut quis endo eo in iure vindicit, secum ducito, vincito aut nervo aut compedibus XV pondo, ne maiore aut si volet minore vincito. Si volet suo vivito, ni suo vivit, qui eum vinctum habebit, libras faris endo dies dato. Si volet, plus dato.

After that, the creditor can lay hands on him and haul him to court. If he does not satisfy the judgment and no one is surety for him, the creditor may take the defendant with him in stocks or chains...

- Also citizens involved in the false presentation of slavery for benefit could become slaves. If a free man were sold as a slave, then after proving that he is free he shared proceeds from the sale with the party that sold him. A praetor could deprive the seller of his freedom (vindicatio in libertatem).
- Convicts (most of them sentenced to death), could become slaves and their property would belong to state.
- A female Roman citizen could become a slave (under senatus consultum Claudianum form 52) if she had "mutual living" (contubernium) with another man's slave despite the master's objection.

=== Termination of slave status ===
After the Punic Wars, Rome started the mass exploitation of slaves. However, the development of industry, trade and other branches of economy required skilled free workers that took interest in their jobs.

A slave could get free by the act of manumission, by which a master would release him from his authority. Manumissions were different in different epochs. The old civil law (ius civile Quiritium) recognized three kinds of manumissions:

- Manumissio censu, was done by a master in the time of the Centuriate assembly. A master wishing to free his slave needed only to enter him in the censor's list as a citizen.
- Manumissio vindicta, was the liberation of a slave by a fictitious plea for freedom (vindicatio in libertatem). It was done before a magistrate when some citizen (adsertor libertatis) touched a slave by a stick (vindicta), and by right words said that the slave is a free man. If a master did not object to that claim (in iure cessio), a magistrate would validate the slave's freedom (addictio). This had been done under the old civil law (ius civile Quiricium)
- Manumissio testamento, was the liberation of a slave by a will. In a will master usually said "Stichus servus meus liber esto", and the slave would be free and without patron.
  - Manumissio testamento fideicommissaria, was when a master asked his successor to release a slave. If that slave was made free, the man who released him became his patron.
- Manumissio inter amicos, was liberation of a slave by a statement in front of friends. Praetors protected these free slaves (by the Lex Junia Norbana, these people lived as free but died as slaves). This kind of manumission originated at the end of the republic.
  - Manumissio per epistulam, same as above, just done by a statement in a letter.
- Manumissio per mensam was similar to the above manumissions. This one was not as formal as manumissions in time of old civil law, but had the same value as praetoric manumissions. Manumissions of this kind originated in the time of empire.
- Manumissio in ecclesia, were manumissions made in the time of Christian emperors in front of a priest.

At the beginning of the empire, because of the number of manumissions, legal limitations of manumissions were made. These limitations were implemented by two laws: Lex Fufia Caninia and Lex Aelia Sentia.

According to Roman law, slaves that were freed (libertinus, in regard to his master libertus) became Roman citizens, but they had many fewer rights than Roman citizens that were born free (ingenuus). The slave's former master now became his patron (patronus), and the libertus still had obligations towards him (this was regulated by law). The libertus had to be obedient and respectful to his patron (obsequium et reverentia). The patron could punish a disobedient libertus, In older times he could even kill him (ius vitae necisque), but later he could not. In some circumstances he could even ask a magistrate to turn the libertus into a slave once again (accusatio ingrati).
