= Potestas =

Latin word meaning power or faculty

Potestas is a Latin word meaning power or faculty. It is an important concept in Roman Law.

== Origin of the concept ==
The idea of potestas originally referred to the power, through coercion, of a Roman magistrate to promulgate edicts, give action to litigants, etc. This power, in Roman political and legal theory, is considered analogous in kind though lesser in degree to military power. The most important magistrates (such as consuls and praetors) are said to have imperium, which is the ultimate form of potestas, and refers indeed to military power.

Potestas strongly contrasts with the power of the Roman Senate and the prudentes, a common way to refer to Roman jurists. While the magistrates had potestas, the prudentes exercised auctoritas. It is said that auctoritas is a manifestation of socially recognized knowledge, while potestas is a manifestation of socially recognized power. In Roman political theory, both were necessary to guide the res publica and they had to inform each other.

== Evolution of the concept in the Middle Ages ==
After the fall of the Western Roman Empire, most institutions of Roman public law fell into disuse, but much of Roman political theory remained. In a letter, Duo Sunt, Pope Gelasius I argued that Christendom was ruled, in theory, by the priests and princes. The former had the spiritual authority, which was identified with auctoritas, while the latter had temporal power, identified with potestas. At first, the Pope crowned secular rulers after Pope Stephen II crowned the Frankish king Pepin the Short in January 754, and secular rulers often appointed local bishops and abbots, but after the Investiture Controversy the Pope was instead chosen by the College of Cardinals and, at least in theory, approved episcopal nominations.

As the effective power of the Holy Roman Empire declined, kingdoms asserted their own independence. One way to do this was to claim that the king had, in his kingdom, the same power as the emperor in the empire, and so the king assumed the attributes of potestas.

The concept of plena in re potestas was often used in 13th-century Europe, of ownership as being "in full power" to do what one likes with one's property. The use of the dogma was also used by Edward I. Although its ultimate use is ambiguous, it was used to give to parliament representatives the authority of making choices in parliament (full powers). This, in turn, helped Edward I coerce shire representatives to grant taxes.

== Podestà ==
In some of the Italian city states, the term "Potestas" describes the authority of a magistrate developed into "Podestà", which was the chief magistrate's title.

== See also ==
- Jurisprudence – Theoretical study of law
- Edict – Announcement of a law, often associated with monarchism
- Tribune – Elected Roman officials
