= Lex Aelia Sentia =

Roman law on slavery

The Lex Aelia Sentia was a law established in the Roman Empire in 4 AD. It was one of the laws that the Roman assemblies passed at the behest of the emperor Augustus. Along with the Lex Fufia Caninia of 2 BC, this law regulated the manumission (freeing from ownership) of slaves.

== The Law ==
The Lex Aelia Sentia (4 CE) does not survive in its original wording. Like many Roman laws, it's known only indirectly, through:

- Gaius, Institutes (Book 1) — the most important source
- Later jurists such as Ulpian and Paulus (via the Digest)
- Occasional references in Tacitus and other imperial writers

From these sources, scholars have reconstructed its main provisions, especially those dealing with manumission and citizenship, but no continuous or authoritative text exists.

=== Provisions ===
This law had several provisions. For a manumission to be valid, the owner had to be at least twenty years old, and the slave at least thirty. Slaves whose masters had punished them for criminal acts could not become Roman citizens if they were later freed, as was customary for formally manumitted slaves in the Republican era; instead, they would be counted among the dediticii, who were free subjects of Roman who held neither the rights of Roman cives nor Latin rights.

If a manumitted slave was under age thirty, he could only achieve full citizenship after a legal proceeding (consilia) similar to a family law trial. These legal proceedings were to be held at pre-determined times in the provinces and in Rome. Any slave under the age of thirty could achieve full citizenship rights without the need for a consilia if his master was insolvent and agreed to free him. If a slave was freed under the age of thirty, but was not granted full citizenship rights upon his manumission, he could be granted those full citizenship rights if he married a Roman freedwoman or freewoman, and had with this woman a child who was, at the time, at least one year of age. If he could prove this to a magistrate or governor, he, his wife, and his child, would all become full citizens. If the father had died before this had occurred, the mother could accomplish the same result. This provision was inserted by Augustus to increase the rate of marriage and childbirth, which were both in decline. Augustus also believed that public morals were in a state of decline during his reign, and so by encouraging marriage especially, Augustus was attempting to "restore" the degree of virtue that he believed had existed under the Republic.

Slaves could be pledged as collateral for a loan. If a master manumitted his slave in order to defraud his creditors, the manumission was invalid. A person under the age of twenty could only manumit a slave if he went through the ordinary legal proceeding (consilium). This provision, and several other provisions did not apply to slaves who had been given membership in certain lower classes of freedmen. These classes were included in these provisions, however, upon a decree of the senate during the reign of the emperor Hadrian. By the time of the late empire, this law had little importance. This law was passed by virtue of the constitutional forms at the time of Augustus, when the status of a civis had not yet lost its value, and a semblance of the Constitution of the Roman Republic still existed.

== See also ==
- Roman Law
- Status in Roman legal system
- List of Roman laws
