= Pater familias =

Oldest living male in an ancient Roman household

The pater familias, also written as paterfamilias (pl.: patres familias), was the head of a Roman family. The pater familias was the oldest living male in a household, and could legally exercise autocratic authority over his extended family. The term is Latin for "father of the family" or "owner of the family estate". The form is archaic in Latin, preserving the old genitive ending in -ās (see Latin declension), whereas in classical Latin the normal first declension genitive singular ending was -ae. The pater familias always had to be a Roman citizen.

Roman law and tradition (mos majorum) established the power of the pater familias within the community of his own extended familia. In Roman family law, the term patria potestās ('power of a father') refers to this concept. He held legal privilege over the property of the familia, and varying levels of authority over his dependents: these included his wife and children, certain other relatives through blood or adoption, clients, freedmen and slaves. The same mos majorum moderated his authority and determined his responsibilities to his own familia and to the broader community. He had a duty to father and raise healthy children as future citizens of Rome, to maintain the moral propriety and well-being of his household, to honour his clan and ancestral gods and to dutifully participate—and if possible, serve—in Rome's political, religious and social life. In effect, the pater familias was expected to be a good citizen. In theory at least, he held powers of life and death over every member of his extended familia through ancient right. In practice, the extreme form of this right was seldom exercised. It was eventually limited by law.

In the Roman tradition, the term has appeared mostly in legal texts, and to a lesser extent, in literary texts. In both types of discourses, the term has been most commonly used to refer to the estate owner, a title considered conceptually separate from familial relations.

== Roman familia ==
The Roman household was conceived of as an economic and juridical unit or estate: familia originally meant the group of the famuli (the servi, the slaves of a rural estate) living under the same roof. That meaning later expanded to indicate the familia as the basic Roman social unit, which might include the domus (house or home) but was legally distinct from it: a familia might own one or several homes. All members and properties of a familia were subject to the authority of a pater familias: his legal, social and religious position defined familia as a microcosm of the Roman state. In Roman law, the potestas of the pater familias was official but distinct from that of magistrates.

Only a Roman citizen held the status of pater familias, and there could be only one holder of that office within a household. He was responsible for its well-being, reputation and legal and moral propriety. The entire familia was expected to adhere to the core principles and laws of the Twelve Tables, which the pater familias had a duty to exemplify, enjoin and, if necessary, enforce, so within the familia Republican law and tradition (mos majorum) allowed him powers of life and death (vitae necisque potestas). He was also obliged to observe the constraints imposed by Roman custom and law on all potestas. His decisions should be obtained through counsel, consultation and consent within the familia, which were decisions by committee (consilium). The family consilia probably involved the most senior members of his own household, especially his wife, and, if necessary, his peers and seniors within his extended clan (gens).

Augustus's legislation on the morality of marriage co-opted the traditional potestas of the pater familias. Augustus was not only Rome's princeps but also its father (pater patriae). As such, he was responsible for the entire Roman familia. Rome's survival required that citizens produce children. That could not be left to individual conscience. The falling birth rate was considered a marker of degeneracy and self-indulgence, particularly among the elite, who were supposed to set an example. Lex Julia maritandis ordinibus compelled marriage upon men and women within specified age ranges and remarriage on the divorced and bereaved within certain time limits. The Lex Julia de adulteriis coercendis severely penalised adulterous wives and any husbands who tolerated such behaviour. The Lex Papia Poppaea extended and modified the laws in relation to intermarriage between social classes and inheritance. Compliance was rewarded and exceptional public duty brought exemption, but dictatorial compulsion was deeply unpopular and quite impractical. The laws were later softened in theory and practise, but the imperial quaestio perpetua remained. Its public magistrates now legally over-rode the traditional rights of the family concilium and pater familias. The principate shows a clear trend towards the erosion of individual patria potestas and the increasing intrusion of the state into the juridical and executive independence of the familia under its pater.

== As priest of familia, gens and genius ==
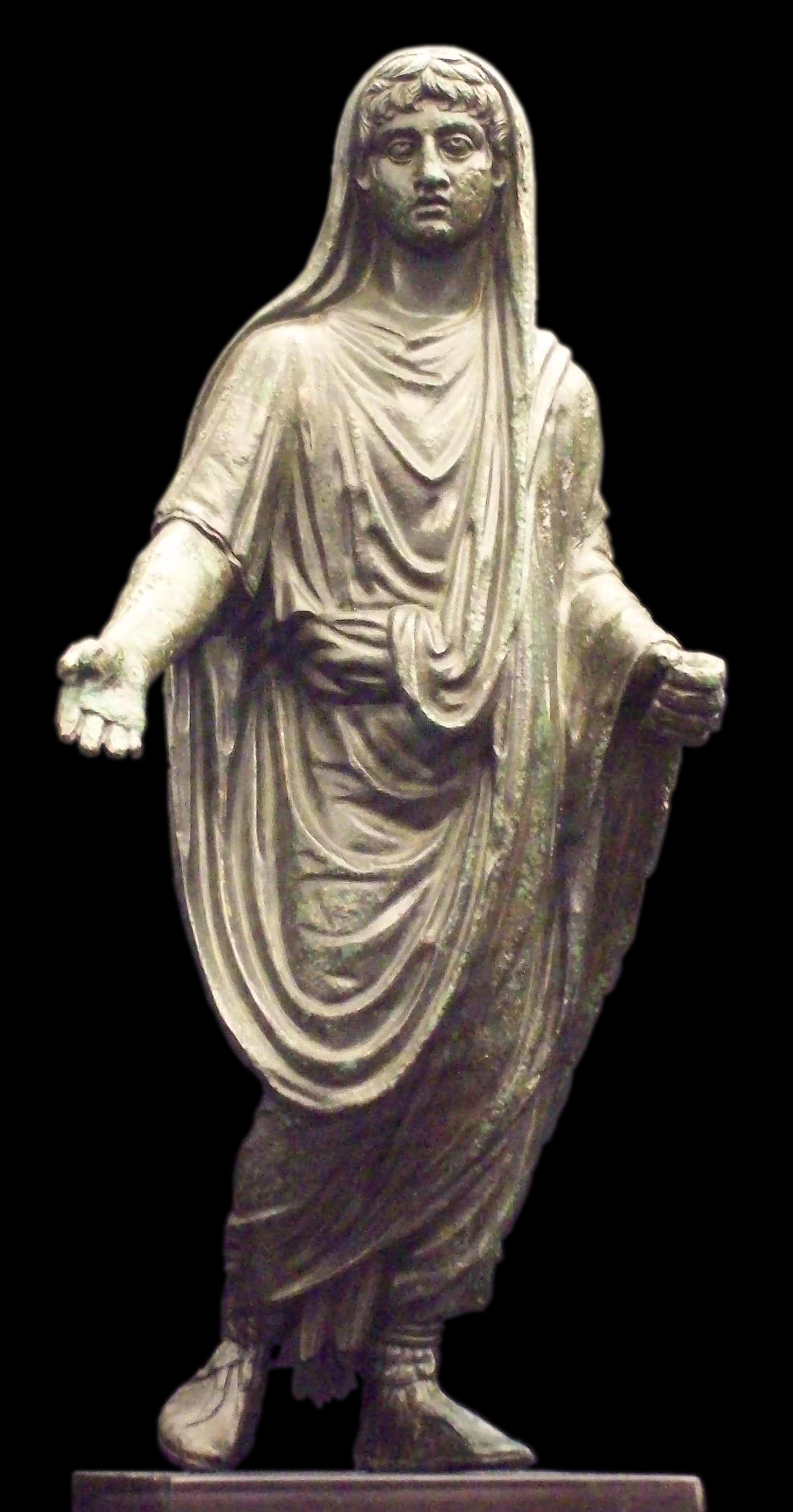
Bronze genius depicted as pater familias (1st century AD)

The domestic responsibilities of the pater familias included his priestly duties (sacra familiae) to his "household gods" (the Lares and Penates) and the ancestral gods of his own gens. The latter were represented by the di parentes as ancestral shades of the departed, and by the genius cult. Genius has been interpreted as the essential, heritable spirit (or divine essence, or soul) and generative power that suffused the gens and each of its members. As the singular, lawful head of a family derived from a gens, the pater familias embodied and expressed its genius through his pious fulfillment of ancestral obligations. The pater familias was therefore owed a reciprocal duty of genius cult by his entire familia. He in his turn conferred genius and the duty of sacra familiae to his children—whether by blood or by adoption.

Roman religious law defined the religious rites of familia as sacra privata (funded by the familia rather than the state) and "unofficial" (not a rite of state office or magistracy, though the state pontifices and censor might intervene if the observation of sacra privata was lax or improper). The responsibility for funding and executing sacra privata therefore fell to the head of the household and no other. As well as observance of common rites and festivals (including those marked by domestic rites), each family had its own unique internal religious calendar—marking the formal acceptance of infant children, coming of age, marriages, deaths and burials. In rural estates, the entire familia would gather to offer sacrifice(s) to the gods for the protection and fertility of fields and livestock. All such festivals and offerings were presided over by the pater familias.

== Wife ==
The legal potestas of the pater familias over his wife depended on the form of marriage between them. In the Early Republic, a wife was "handed over" from the legal control of her father to the legal control of (the father of) her husband in the form of marriage cum manu (Latin cum manu means "with hand"). If the man divorced his wife, he or his father had to give the dowry and the wife back to the pater familias of the wife's former family. By the Late Republic, manus marriage had become rare, and a woman legally remained part of her birth family, under the hand of their pater familias.

Women emancipated from the potestas of a pater familias were independent by law (sui iuris) but had a male guardian appointed to them. A woman sui iuris had the right to take legal action on her own behalf but not to administer legal matters for others.

== Children ==
The filii familias (children of the family) could include the biological and adopted children of the pater familias and his siblings. The laws of the Twelve Tables required the pater familias to ensure that "obviously deformed" infants were put to death. The survival of congenitally disabled adults, conspicuously evidenced among the elite by the partially lame Emperor Claudius, demonstrates that personal choice was exercised in the matter. The pater familias also had the power to sell his children into slavery; Roman law provided, however, that if a child had been sold as a slave three times, he was no longer subject to patria potestas. Moreover, the pater familias had the power to approve or reject marriages of his sons and daughters; however, an edict of Emperor Augustus provided that the pater familias could not withhold that permission lightly. Because of their extended rights (their longa manus, literally "long hand"), the patres familias also had a series of extra duties: duties towards the filii and the slaves, but some of the duties were recognized not by the original ius civile but only by the ius gentium, specially directed to foreigners, or by the ius honorarium, the law of the Magistratus, especially the Praetor, which would emerge only in a latter period of Roman law.

Adult filii remained under the authority of their pater and could not themselves acquire the rights of a pater familias while he lived. Legally, any property acquired by individual family members (sons, daughters or slaves) was acquired for the family estate: the pater familias held sole rights to its disposal and sole responsibility for the consequences, including personal forfeiture of rights and property through debt. Those who lived in their own households at the time of the death of the pater succeeded to the status of pater familias over their respective households (pater familias sui iuris) even if they were only in their teens. Children "emancipated" by a pater familias were effectively disinherited. If a pater familias died intestate, his children were entitled to an equal share of his estate. If a will was left, children could contest the estate.

Over time, the absolute authority of the pater familias weakened, and rights that theoretically existed were no longer enforced or insisted upon. The power over life and death was abolished, the right of punishment was moderated and the sale of children was restricted to cases of extreme necessity. Under Emperor Hadrian, a father who killed his son was stripped of both his citizenship and all its attendant rights, had his property confiscated and was permanently exiled.

== Slavery ==
=== Roman context ===
The original classical Roman definition of familia referred to “a body of slaves,” and did not refer to wives and children. The classical legal concept of pater familias as “head of household” derived from this early conception of familia and, thus, from the legal relationship between masters and slaves, rather than that between fathers and children. Since the early classical period, Roman writers and jurists have interpreted ancient writers’ invocation of pater familias as the basis of the concept of “head of household”—over the alternative Latin word for slaveowner, dominus—as a purposeful choice, intended to mitigate the harsh connotations that the act of slaveholding conferred onto heads of households and expanding the applicability of the term to free members of the household. As a semantic term, pater familias thus connoted heads of household who were thought to combine the affective tenderness of a father with the stern coercion of a slaveowner in ordering their households.

As Roman jurists began to articulate the legal conception of pater familias from the early classical period onwards, the minimum qualification for assuming the status of pater familias came to be understood as one’s capacity to own property. However, in Roman law, this was considered a distinct dimension of the pater familias’ authority from their capacity to hold dominion over slaves. While both slaves and the estate itself were considered part of the familia unit over which pater familias held authority, they were recognized as distinct from family members (wives, children, and grandchildren). Despite these distinctions, what all members of the household shared was their subjecthood to the authority, or potestas, of the pater familias. By the second century, A.D., the distinction between family members and slaves within the same household had lessened, even as the patria potestas also weakened over time.

Patres familias wielded complete and separate authority over members of their households, including their slaves. In cases of adjudicating legal transgressions committed by slaves, patres familias exhibited equivalent jurisdiction as that of local civil magistrates, including the ability to absolve slaves of any wrongdoing, trying them by jury, or sentencing them to capital punishments.

While some Roman patres familias permitted slaves in their households to establish quasi-marital unions (known as contubernia) as a means of forming communal bonds among slaves, these unions were only recognized within the household and carried no legal bearing outside of the household. A child that resulted from such a union was himself a slave of his mother's owner.

Roman legal sources often recognized slaves as part of the instrumenta (roughly translated as “equipment”) of the household to highlight the service they provided the pater familias. This definition included both slaves working in field settings and those living in the domestic household and working in direct service of the pater familias.

Roman women sui iuris (“of their own power,” and not under the authority of any pater familias) possessed the legal right to own slaves as instrumenta, though jurists decided on a case-by-case basis whether to extend the status of pater familias to them in their capacity as slaveowners. In general, however, the status of pater familias could not be fully extended to women sui iuris because Roman law recognized the authority that pater familias wielded over members of the immediate family as strictly gendered, i.e., male. Nonetheless, historians and legal scholars have often overlooked this exception to the rule that allowed some women sui iuris (usually wealthy and of the upper socioeconomic stratum of society) to attain legal recognition as pater familias through their ownership of slaves.

=== Historical applications ===
Outside of the Roman context, various slavery regimes in world history have adopted the concept of pater familias to structure the legal, cultural, and social relationships between slaveowners and slaves. The law code of fifteenth-century Valencian society, for example, adopted the classical Roman conception of familia to recognize servant laborers and slaves as members of the domestic household, roughly equal in status to family members given their subjecthood to the authority of the pater familias. As a consequence of this, patres familias maintained honor and status within their communities by fulfilling both the material and spiritual needs of all members of the household, including slaves. This included providing for the food, clothing, shelter, education, and baptism of slaves. When they reneged on these obligations, the law code considered them to forfeit their right to ownership of their slaves, leading in some cases to disputes between paternal heads of household over the status of slaves whom they each claimed to have raised.

In the context of plantation slavery in the antebellum U.S. South, slaveowning planters developed a rhetorical defense of slavery as a benevolent, paternalistic institution based on the ancient Roman model of the pater familias. Some planters employed the concept as a legal protectionary measure, instructing renters to whom they hired out their slaves to treat them as good pater familias, in an effort to stymie abusive practices. Others used the concept to rationalize planter rule, claiming themselves sovereigns of their households who provided for all constituent members, and demanding their loyalty and labor in return. Drawing on the Roman precedent in this way, these planters deemed their slaves to be dependents who ultimately benefitted from the paternalistic ordering of the household. Southern newspapers and print media repeatedly promoted this idea in order to reconcile slavery with the country's founding ideals, often taking it to extremes. This paternalistic ideology persisted after the legal abolition of slavery, as white employers and political leaders in the South attempted to maintain a hierarchical socioeconomic class status over freedmen, as well as dependent women and poor laborers. thereby expanding the Roman household model of pater familias to the level of broader society.

The patriarchal mode of slavery that Southern U.S. and Caribbean slaveowners attempted to establish often clashed with slaves' familial structures, including some with West African roots. The Akan society of the Gold Coast, for example, was largely matrilineal and composed of individual clans or lineages. Mandé society, while more often organized along patrilineal lines, exhibited some matrilineal lines and generally reserved powerful positions of political and household authority for women. In Igbo society, women were "most celebrated" for their roles as mothers and wives, but also participated in independent market activity and in communal defense. As a sizable proportion of slaves transported to the New World in the trans-Atlantic trade originated from Akan, Mandé, and Igbo societies, some historians have noted a connection between the matrilineal elements of these West African cultures and the centrality of women and mothers in slave families. These alternative modes of structuring household and family life among slaves threatened some planters' intentions to serve as the solely acknowledged pater familias of their households. However, the vast majority of African slaves came from patriarchal cultures, especially those who had developed empires and urban centres.

== See also ==
- Bonus pater familias
- Kyrios
- The Ancient City – perennial 1864 book by Numa Denis Fustel de Coulanges

== Sources ==
- Beard, M., Price, S., North, J., Religions of Rome: Volume 1, a History, illustrated, Cambridge University Press, 1998. ISBN 0-521-31682-0.
- Beard, M., Price, S., North, J., Religions of Rome: Volume 2, a sourcebook, illustrated, Cambridge University Press, 1998. ISBN 0-521-45646-0.
- Frier, Bruce W., McGinn, Thomas A.J., and Lidov, Joel, A Casebook on Roman Family Law, Oxford University Press (American Philological Association), 2004. ISBN 978-0-19-516186-1.
- Huebner, S. R, Ratzan, D. M. eds. Growing up Fatherless in Antiquity, Cambridge University Press, 2009.
- Parkin, Tim, & Pomeroy, Arthur, Roman Social History, a Sourcebook, Routledge, 2007. ISBN 978-0-415-42675-6.
- Severy, Beth, Augustus and the family at the birth of the Roman Empire, Routledge, 2003. ISBN 0-415-30959-X.
